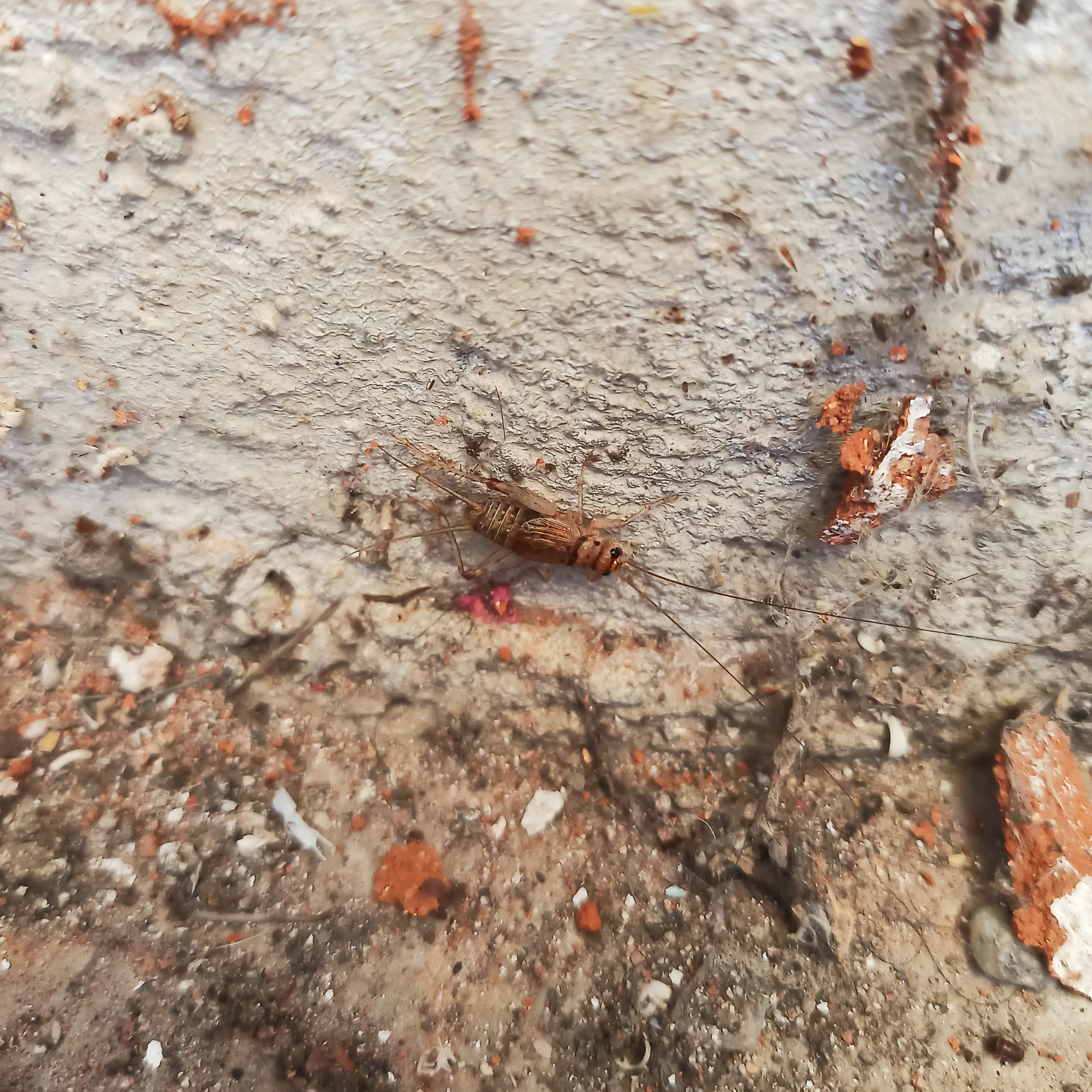
- Tropical house cricket

Scientific classification
- Kingdom: Animalia
- Phylum: Arthropoda
- Clade: Pancrustacea
- Class: Insecta
- Order: Orthoptera
- Suborder: Ensifera
- Family: Gryllidae
- Subfamily: Gryllinae
- Tribe: Gryllini
- Genus: Gryllodes
- Species: G. sigillatus

Binomial name
- Gryllodes sigillatus (Walker, 1869)

= Tropical house cricket =

Gryllodes sigillatus

Species of cricket

Gryllodes sigillatus, the tropical house cricket, Indian house cricket or banded cricket, is a small cricket probably native to southwestern Asia, but has spread throughout tropical regions worldwide. Like its relative the house cricket, the tropical house cricket is also raised commercially for feeding certain pets such as reptiles, birds, amphibians, and insectivorous arthropods.

== Description ==
The tropical house cricket is slightly smaller than its relative the house cricket, growing about 13–18 mm (0.51–0.71 in). These crickets are light yellowish tan and have two thick black bands. One of the bands runs through the bottom of the thorax while the other goes across the upper abdomen. Females are similar to males, only wingless and a long ovipositor emerging from its rear.

Close-up of a Gryllodes sigillatus

== Relationship with humans ==
=== As pet food ===
Decorated house crickets are relatively new to the pet trade and are favored by many people due to easier care requirements than the more-common house cricket or the black field cricket. The banded crickets are said to be a lot more active than competitors, and live longer lifespans than the average house cricket. They also have a lower chitin content than average crickets, making digestibility easier. Tropical house crickets are also immune to the CrPV virus. Care is similar to that of the house cricket.

=== As pests ===
Tropical house crickets generally cause no harm, though the singing males can be a nuisance. They can be managed with baits sold for cockroach or earwig control.
