= Eogryllus =

Scientific classification
- Domain: Eukaryota
- Kingdom: Animalia
- Phylum: Arthropoda
- Class: Insecta
- Order: Orthoptera
- Suborder: Ensifera
- Family: Gryllidae
- Subfamily: Gryllinae
- Tribe: Gryllini
- Genus: †Eogryllus; Gorochov, 2012

Species
- See text

Extinct genus of crickets

Eogryllus is an extinct genus of crickets in the family Gryllidae.

== Taxonomy ==
The genus contains the following species:

- †Eogryllus elongatus Gorochov, 2012
- †Eogryllus unicolor Gorochov, 2012
