= Abmisha =

Scientific classification
- Domain: Eukaryota
- Kingdom: Animalia
- Phylum: Arthropoda
- Class: Insecta
- Order: Orthoptera
- Suborder: Ensifera
- Family: Gryllidae
- Subfamily: Gryllinae
- Tribe: Gryllini
- Genus: Abmisha; Otte, 1987

Species
- See text

Genus of crickets

Abmisha is a genus of crickets in tribe Gryllini; species are recorded from East Africa.

== Taxonomy ==
The Orthoptera Species File database lists the following species:

- Abmisha coiblemmoides Gorochov, 2001
- Abmisha illex Otte, 1987 - type species (locality Shimba Hills, Kenya)
- Abmisha sigi Otte, 1987
