= Tartarogryllus =

Scientific classification
- Kingdom: Animalia
- Phylum: Arthropoda
- Class: Insecta
- Order: Orthoptera
- Suborder: Ensifera
- Family: Gryllidae
- Subfamily: Gryllinae
- Tribe: Gryllini
- Genus: Tartarogryllus; Tarbinsky, 1940

Genus of crickets

External image
- Images at iNaturalist

Tartarogryllus is a genus of crickets in the family Gryllidae and tribe Gryllini, erected by Sergey Tarbinsky in 1940. The known distribution (possibly incomplete) of species includes: N Africa, S Europe (Spain, Turkey) through to western Asia.

== Species ==
The Orthoptera Species File lists:

1. Tartarogryllus atlantis (Chopard, 1943)
2. Tartarogryllus bidentatus Roy, 1969
3. Tartarogryllus cyrenaicus (Werner, 1908)
4. Tartarogryllus fadlii Defaut, 1987
5. Tartarogryllus jakesi Chopard, 1968
6. Tartarogryllus rungsi (Morales-Agacino, 1947)
7. Tartarogryllus sandanski Andreeva, 1982
8. Tartarogryllus tartarus (Saussure, 1874) - type species (as Gryllus tartarus Saussure = T. tartarus tartarus)

Note Other species names, previously placed in this genus, may now be included in Eumodicogryllus.
