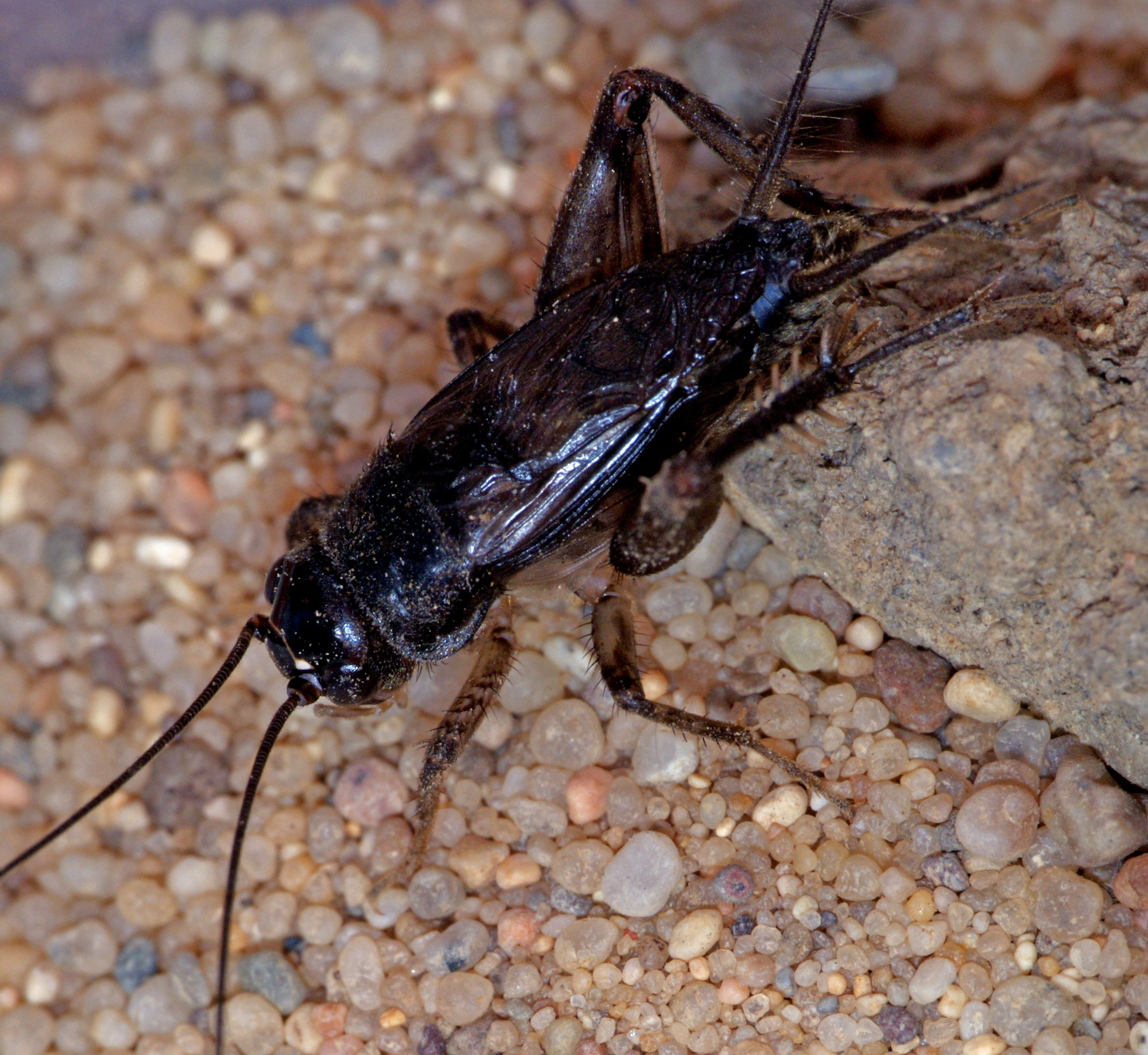
- S. palmetorum, male

Scientific classification
- Domain: Eukaryota
- Kingdom: Animalia
- Phylum: Arthropoda
- Class: Insecta
- Order: Orthoptera
- Suborder: Ensifera
- Family: Gryllidae
- Subfamily: Gryllinae
- Tribe: Gryllini
- Genus: Svercus; Gorochov, 1988
- Species: S. palmetorum

Binomial name
- Svercus palmetorum (Krauss, 1902)

= Svercus palmetorum =

Species of cricket

Svercus palmetorum is a small species of cricket, and the sole member of the genus Svercus.

== Distribution and habitat ==
The subspecies Svercus palmetorum palmetorum is widespread in North Africa, South-Western Asia, Cyprus and Malta - in Italy it was observed in Sardinia, Sicily, Calabria, and probably the subspecies can be encountered also in Corsica. Another subspecies, Svercus palmetorum geonomes (Otte & Cade, 1984) lives in Southern Africa and Madagascar.

== Description ==
The adult males grow up to 10.9–13.6 millimetres (0.43–0.54 in) long, while females reach 11.5–13 millimetres (0.45–0.51 in). The overall color is blackish, with a whitish band on the forehead. In both sexes, hind wings are reduced and the fore wings cover almost the entirety of the abdomen. The species resembles Modicogryllus algirius but is bigger and can be easily distinguished by the shorter wings, the shape of male genitalia and by its typical restless, melodious and sharp song emitted at a frenzied rhythm of up to 150 syllables per second.

== Biology ==
Adults can be found in Spring and Summer in rather wet, even brackish habitats and can dive and swim when needed. Its small size and its mobility make it uneasy to catch, but it can be attracted to food traps with vinegar and beer, and sometimes can be found in pitfall traps.

== Gallery ==
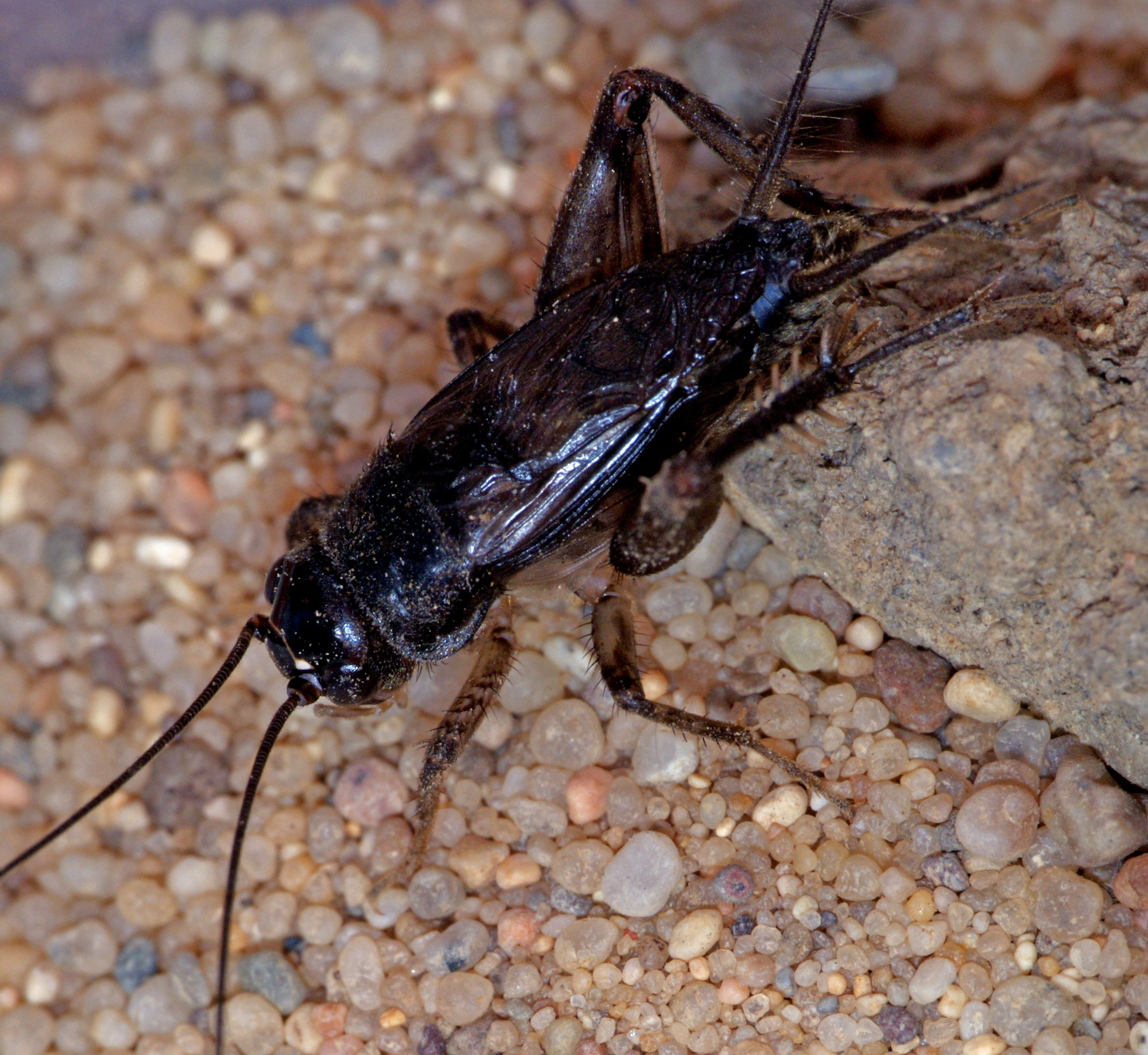
A male Sardinian specimen of Svercus palmetorum palmetorum (Krauss, 1902) from Fluminimaggiore

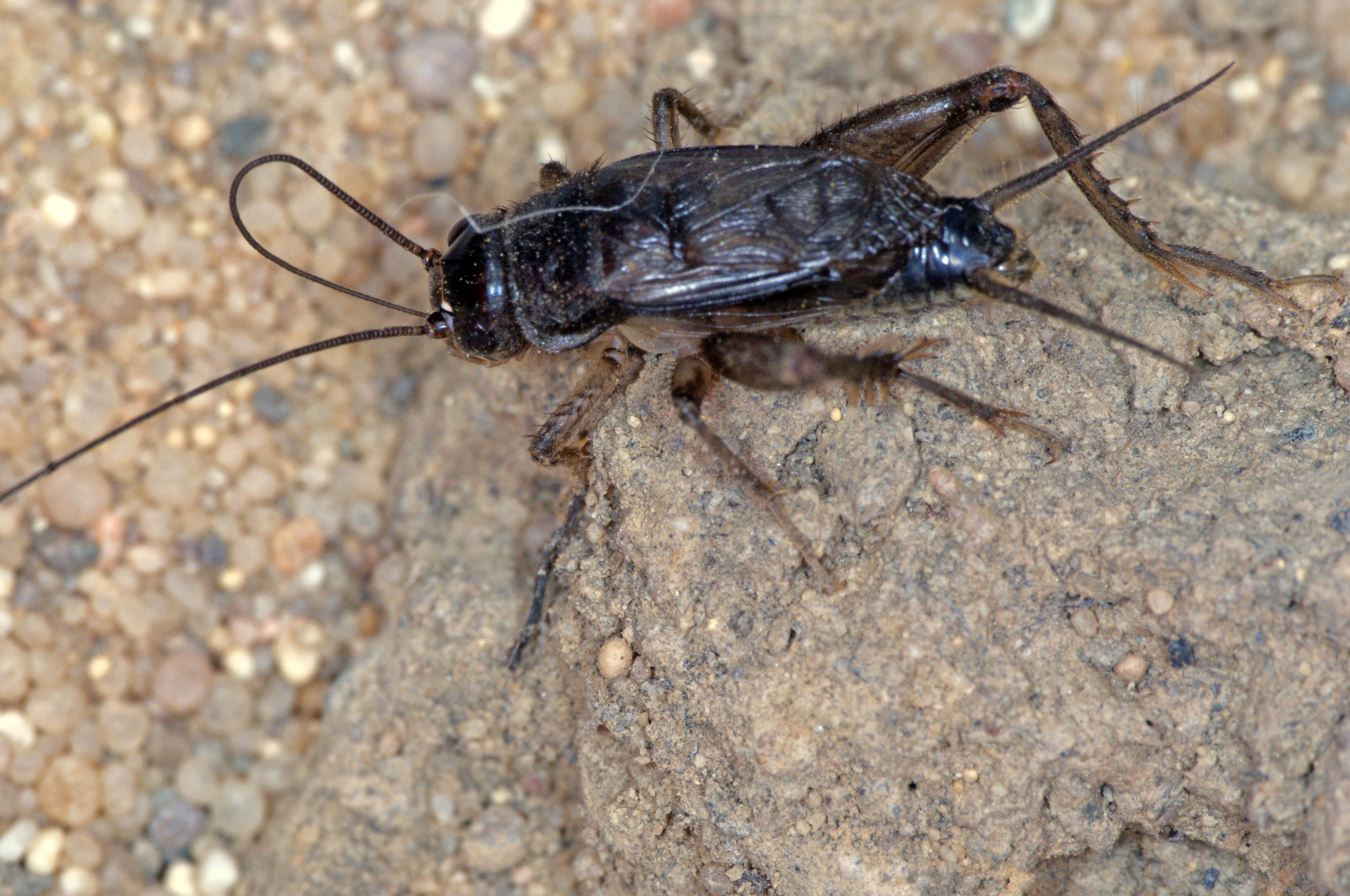
The same specimen cleaning its antennae

== Bibliography ==
- Brizio, C. & Buzzetti F.M. 2014. Biodiversity Journal, 2014, 5 (1): 25–38 >> Ultrasound recordings of some Orthoptera from Sardinia (Italy)
- Krauss H.A., 1902. Verhandlungen der ZoologischBotanischen Gesellschaft in Wien, 52: 230–254. >> Beitragzurkenntniss der Orthopterenfauna der Sahara
- Otte, D. & Cade. 1984. Proceedings of the Academy of Natural Sciences of Philadelphia (Proc. Acad. Nat. Sci. Philad.) 136:98-122 >> African crickets (Gryllidae). 6. The genus Gryllus and some related genera (Gryllinae, Gryllini)
