= Mimicogryllus =

Scientific classification
- Domain: Eukaryota
- Kingdom: Animalia
- Phylum: Arthropoda
- Class: Insecta
- Order: Orthoptera
- Suborder: Ensifera
- Family: Gryllidae
- Subfamily: Gryllinae
- Tribe: Gryllini
- Genus: Mimicogryllus; Gorochov, 1994

Genus of crickets

Mimicogryllus is a genus of crickets in the family Gryllidae and tribe Gryllini. Species have been found in Indo-China and Borneo.

== Species ==
Mimicogryllus includes the following species:

- Mimicogryllus hymenopteroides Gorochov, 1994 - type species (locality: Vietnam)
- Mimicogryllus maculatus Chopard, 1927
- Mimicogryllus splendens Tan, Gorochov & Wahab, 2019
