= Vietacheta =

Scientific classification
- Domain: Eukaryota
- Kingdom: Animalia
- Phylum: Arthropoda
- Class: Insecta
- Order: Orthoptera
- Suborder: Ensifera
- Family: Gryllidae
- Subfamily: Gryllinae
- Tribe: Gryllini
- Genus: Vietacheta; Gorochov, 1992

Genus of crickets

External image
- Images at iNaturalist

Vietacheta is a genus of crickets in the family Gryllidae and tribe Gryllini. Species can be found in southern China and Vietnam. A key to the species is given by Ma et al.

== Species ==
Vietacheta includes the following species:

1. Vietacheta aquila Gorochov, 1992
2. Vietacheta fumea Gorochov, 1992
3. Vietacheta harpophylla Ma, Liu & Xu, 2015
4. Vietacheta picea Gorochov, 1992 - type species - locality: near Tam Dao village, Vinh Phu Province.
