= Doroshenkoa =

Scientific classification
- Domain: Eukaryota
- Kingdom: Animalia
- Phylum: Arthropoda
- Class: Insecta
- Order: Orthoptera
- Suborder: Ensifera
- Family: Gryllidae
- Subfamily: Gryllinae
- Tribe: Gryllini
- Genus: Doroshenkoa; Gorochov, 2004
- Species: D. cambodiensis

Binomial name
- Doroshenkoa cambodiensis Gorochov, 2004

Genus of crickets

Doroshenkoa is a monotypic genus of crickets in the tribe Gryllini. The only species is Doroshenkoa cambodiensis from Cambodia.
