= Conatrullus =

Scientific classification
- Domain: Eukaryota
- Kingdom: Animalia
- Phylum: Arthropoda
- Class: Insecta
- Order: Orthoptera
- Suborder: Ensifera
- Family: Gryllidae
- Subfamily: Gryllinae
- Tribe: Gryllini
- Genus: Conatrullus; Gorochov, 2001
- Species: C. andreji

Binomial name
- Conatrullus andreji Gorochov, 2001

Genus of crickets

Conatrullus is a genus of crickets in the family Gryllidae. The only species is Conatrullus andreji.
