= Crynculus =

Scientific classification
- Domain: Eukaryota
- Kingdom: Animalia
- Phylum: Arthropoda
- Class: Insecta
- Order: Orthoptera
- Suborder: Ensifera
- Family: Gryllidae
- Subfamily: Gryllinae
- Tribe: Gryllini
- Genus: Crynculus; Gorochov, 1996
- Species: C. schmalfussi

Binomial name
- Crynculus schmalfussi Gorochov, 1996

Genus of crickets

Crynculus is a genus of crickets in the family Gryllidae. The only species is Crynculus schmalfussi.
