= Ganoblemmus =

Scientific classification
- Domain: Eukaryota
- Kingdom: Animalia
- Phylum: Arthropoda
- Class: Insecta
- Order: Orthoptera
- Suborder: Ensifera
- Family: Gryllidae
- Subfamily: Gryllinae
- Tribe: Gryllini
- Genus: Ganoblemmus; Karsch, 1893

Species
- See text

Synonyms
- Alluaudiella Bolívar, 1893

Genus of crickets

Ganoblemmus is a genus of crickets in the tribe Gryllini; species are recorded from Africa.

== Taxonomy ==
The genus contains the following species:

- Ganoblemmus flavipes Sjöstedt, 1900
- Ganoblemmus flavopictus (Bolívar, 1893)
- Ganoblemmus rasilis Karsch, 1893
- Ganoblemmus rhodocephalus Gorochov, 1996
- Ganoblemmus rufotibialis Gorochov, 1996
