= Damaracheta =

Scientific classification
- Domain: Eukaryota
- Kingdom: Animalia
- Phylum: Arthropoda
- Class: Insecta
- Order: Orthoptera
- Suborder: Ensifera
- Family: Gryllidae
- Subfamily: Gryllinae
- Tribe: Gryllini
- Genus: Damaracheta; Otte, 1987

Species
- See text

Genus of crickets

Damaracheta is a genus of crickets in the family Gryllidae.

== Taxonomy ==
The genus contains the following species:

- Damaracheta capensis Otte, 1987
- Damaracheta kasungu Otte, 1987
- Damaracheta kriegbaumi Otte & Hennig, 1998
- Damaracheta mlozi Otte, 1987
- Damaracheta schultzei (Karny, 1910)
- Damaracheta zomba Otte, 1987
