= Hemitrullus =

Scientific classification
- Domain: Eukaryota
- Kingdom: Animalia
- Phylum: Arthropoda
- Class: Insecta
- Order: Orthoptera
- Suborder: Ensifera
- Family: Gryllidae
- Subfamily: Gryllinae
- Tribe: Gryllini
- Genus: Hemitrullus; Gorochov, 2001

Genus of crickets

Hemitrullus is a genus of crickets in the family Gryllidae and tribe Gryllini. Species can be found in Indo-China.

== Species ==
Hemitrullus includes the following species:

subgenus Atrullus Gorochov, 2001

1. Hemitrullus banlungi Gorochov, 2001

subgenus Hemitrullus Gorochov, 2001

1. Hemitrullus changi Gorochov, 2001
  - type species - locality: Trat, Ko Chang, Thailand

subgenus Peratrullus Gorochov, 2001

1. Hemitrullus alboapex Gorochov, 2001
2. Hemitrullus nigroapex Gorochov, 2001
3. Hemitrullus perspicillaris Ingrisch, 1987
