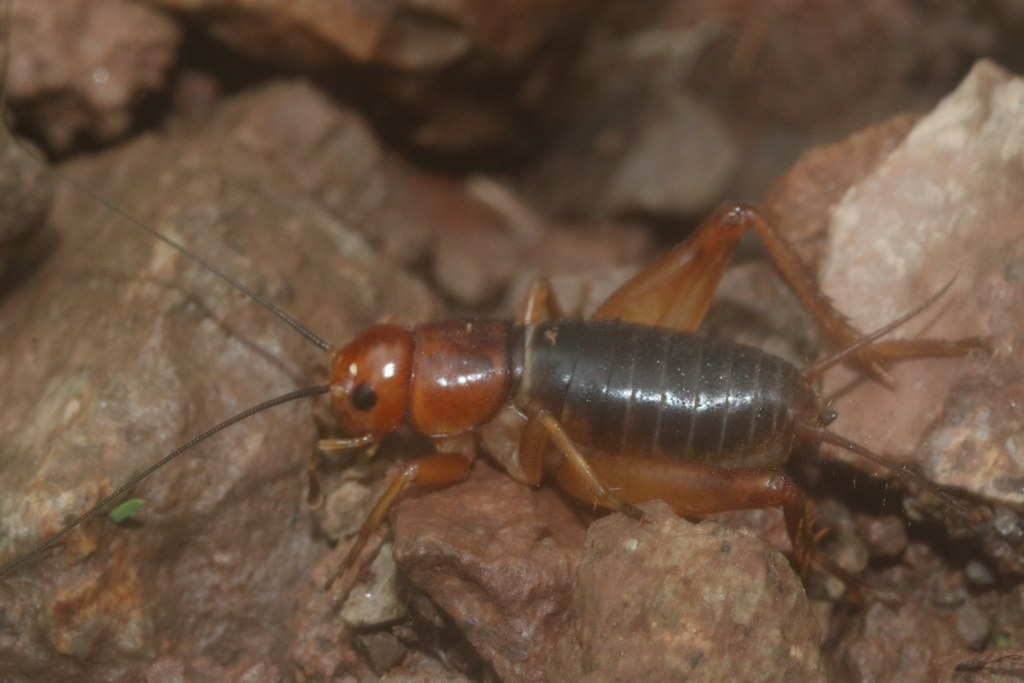
- In Sinaloa

Scientific classification
- Kingdom: Animalia
- Phylum: Arthropoda
- Class: Insecta
- Order: Orthoptera
- Suborder: Ensifera
- Family: Gryllidae
- Genus: Gryllita
- Species: G. arizonae

Binomial name
- Gryllita arizonae Hebard, 1935

= Gryllita arizonae =

Species of cricket

Gryllita arizonae, the Arizona cricket, is a species of cricket in the subfamily Gryllinae. It is found in North America.
