= Conogryllus =

Scientific classification
- Domain: Eukaryota
- Kingdom: Animalia
- Phylum: Arthropoda
- Class: Insecta
- Order: Orthoptera
- Suborder: Ensifera
- Family: Gryllidae
- Subfamily: Gryllinae
- Tribe: Gryllini
- Genus: Conogryllus; Gorochov, 2001
- Species: C. testaceus

Binomial name
- Conogryllus testaceus (Chopard, 1934)

Subspecies
- See text

Genus of crickets

Conogryllus is a monotypic genus of African crickets in the tribe Gryllini.

== Taxonomy ==
The genus contains the following species found in the Congo Basin:

- Conogryllus testaceus (Chopard, 1934)
