= Clearidas =

Scientific classification
- Domain: Eukaryota
- Kingdom: Animalia
- Phylum: Arthropoda
- Class: Insecta
- Order: Orthoptera
- Suborder: Ensifera
- Family: Gryllidae
- Subfamily: Gryllinae
- Tribe: Gryllini
- Genus: Clearidas; Stål, 1876

Species
- See text

Genus of crickets

Clearidas is a genus of crickets in the family Gryllidae.

== Taxonomy ==
The genus contains the following species:

- Clearidas dimidiatus Chopard, 1940
- Clearidas nigriceps Stål, 1876
