= Conoblemmus =

Scientific classification
- Kingdom: Animalia
- Phylum: Arthropoda
- Class: Insecta
- Order: Orthoptera
- Suborder: Ensifera
- Family: Gryllidae
- Subfamily: Gryllinae
- Tribe: Gryllini
- Genus: Conoblemmus; Adelung, 1910

Species
- See text

Genus of crickets

Conoblemmus is a genus of crickets in the tribe Gryllini; species are recorded from central Asia.

== Description ==
Conoblemmus is very close to the genus Cophaphonus. The body of this species is dense, covered with short hairs. The protonum and head are identical in width. There is an absence of ocelli, and horizontal diameters of the eyes are equal to the distance from anterior margin of the eye to the apex of frons. In males, the frons are flat and concave, while in females it is weakly rounded and protruding forwards.

The vertex (top of the head) is rounded and sloping slowly. Facial keels in males are distinct and, and obliterated in females.The pronotum is trapezoidal, narrowing towards the posterior end, having a maximum width greater than its length. The lateral pronotal lobes are also trapezoidal, narrowing towards the rear. The anterior and posterior margins are almost straight, while the front and back lower angles are rounded broadly.

The mesosternal and metasternal episternum (middle and hind underside parts of thorax)contain a pointed tooth at the back edge. The backside of mesosternal epimeron has a rounded notch at the lower edge. The elytra of male specimens are short and lobe-shaped without sound organs, and having sparse venation, whereas ones in female are flat and scale shaped, with no wings.

The front tibia (legs) does not have any tympanal organ on either side, and the front tarsi (feet) are short with the first joint nearly as thick as the third. The hind tibia, however, are thick and constricted laterally. These are rounded at the base and flattened between the spines. The upper side of the hind tibia has spines arranged in a dual-row pattern, which are thick and immobile with short hairs. The first joint of hind tarsus is laterally compressed, with upper side margins having short, thick spinules.

The supra-anal plate has a longitudinal median groove and a rounded edge. Both sexes exhibit long cerci (appendages at abdomen), reaching nearly to the middle of the hind tibia. In males, the subgenital plate has a notch at the tip, while it is small, concave, and trapezoidal, narrowing towards the tip in females.

== Species ==
The genus contains the following species:

- Conoblemmus acutifrons Chopard, 1936
- Conoblemmus araxianus Gorochov, 1996
- Conoblemmus kozlovi Mishchenko & Gorochov, 1981
- Conoblemmus privatus (Mishchenko, 1947)
- Conoblemmus psammophilus Gorochov, 2001
- Conoblemmus riparius (Mishchenko, 1947)
- Conoblemmus saussurei Adelung, 1910
- Conoblemmus tshirkunae (Mishchenko, 1947)
- Conoblemmus vachshianus Gorochov, 1996
- Conoblemmus zimini (Tarbinsky, 1932)
