= Agryllus =

Scientific classification
- Domain: Eukaryota
- Kingdom: Animalia
- Phylum: Arthropoda
- Class: Insecta
- Order: Orthoptera
- Suborder: Ensifera
- Family: Gryllidae
- Subfamily: Gryllinae
- Tribe: Gryllini
- Genus: Agryllus; Gorochov, 1994

Species
- See text

Genus of crickets

Agryllus is a genus of cricket in subfamily Gryllinae, with species records from China, Indochina and Java.

== Taxonomy ==
Agryllus contains the following species:

1. Agryllus apterus He, 2018
2. Agryllus euzonus (Saussure, 1877)
3. Agryllus excultus Gorochov, 1994 - type species
4. Agryllus hemiapterus Gorochov, 2017
5. Agryllus magnigenitalis He & Gorochov, 2017
6. Agryllus siam Gorochov, 2017
