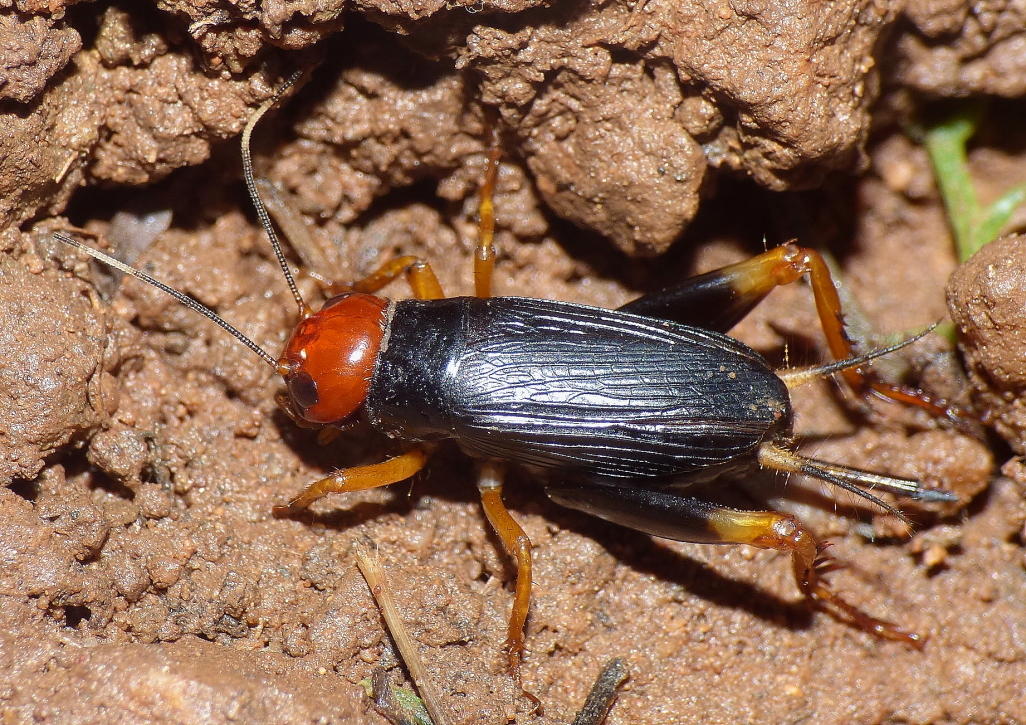
- Phonarellus minor

Scientific classification
- Kingdom: Animalia
- Phylum: Arthropoda
- Class: Insecta
- Order: Orthoptera
- Suborder: Ensifera
- Family: Gryllidae
- Subfamily: Gryllinae
- Tribe: Gryllini
- Genus: Phonarellus; Gorochov, 1983

= Phonarellus =

Genus of crickets

Phonarellus is a genus of crickets in the family Gryllidae and tribe Gryllini. Species can be found in mainland Asia, Japan and tropical Africa.

== Species ==
Phonarellus includes the following species:

- Phonarellus afganicus Gorochov, 1983
- Phonarellus cyclopterus (Gorochov, 2001)
- Phonarellus erythrocephalus (Serville, 1838)
- Phonarellus flavipes Xia, Liu & Yin, 1991
- Phonarellus humeralis (Walker, 1871)
- Phonarellus kareni Otte, Toms & Cade, 1988
- Phonarellus lucens Walker, 1869
- Phonarellus minor (Chopard, 1959) - type species
- Phonarellus mistshenkoi Gorochov, 1983
- Phonarellus miurus Saussure, 1877
- Phonarellus nitidus (Gorochov, 1992)
- Phonarellus primitivus Gorochov, 2021
- Phonarellus ritsemae (Saussure, 1877)
- Phonarellus solomonicus (Gorochov, 2005)
- Phonarellus tympanopterus (Gorochov, 2001)
- Phonarellus zebripes He, 2022
