= Depressogryllus =

Scientific classification
- Domain: Eukaryota
- Kingdom: Animalia
- Phylum: Arthropoda
- Class: Insecta
- Order: Orthoptera
- Suborder: Ensifera
- Family: Gryllidae
- Subfamily: Gryllinae
- Tribe: Gryllini
- Genus: Depressogryllus; Gorochov, 1988
- Species: D. depressiceps

Binomial name
- Depressogryllus depressiceps (Ebner, 1935)

Genus of crickets

Depressogryllus is a genus of crickets in family Gryllidae. The only species is Depressogryllus depressiceps.
