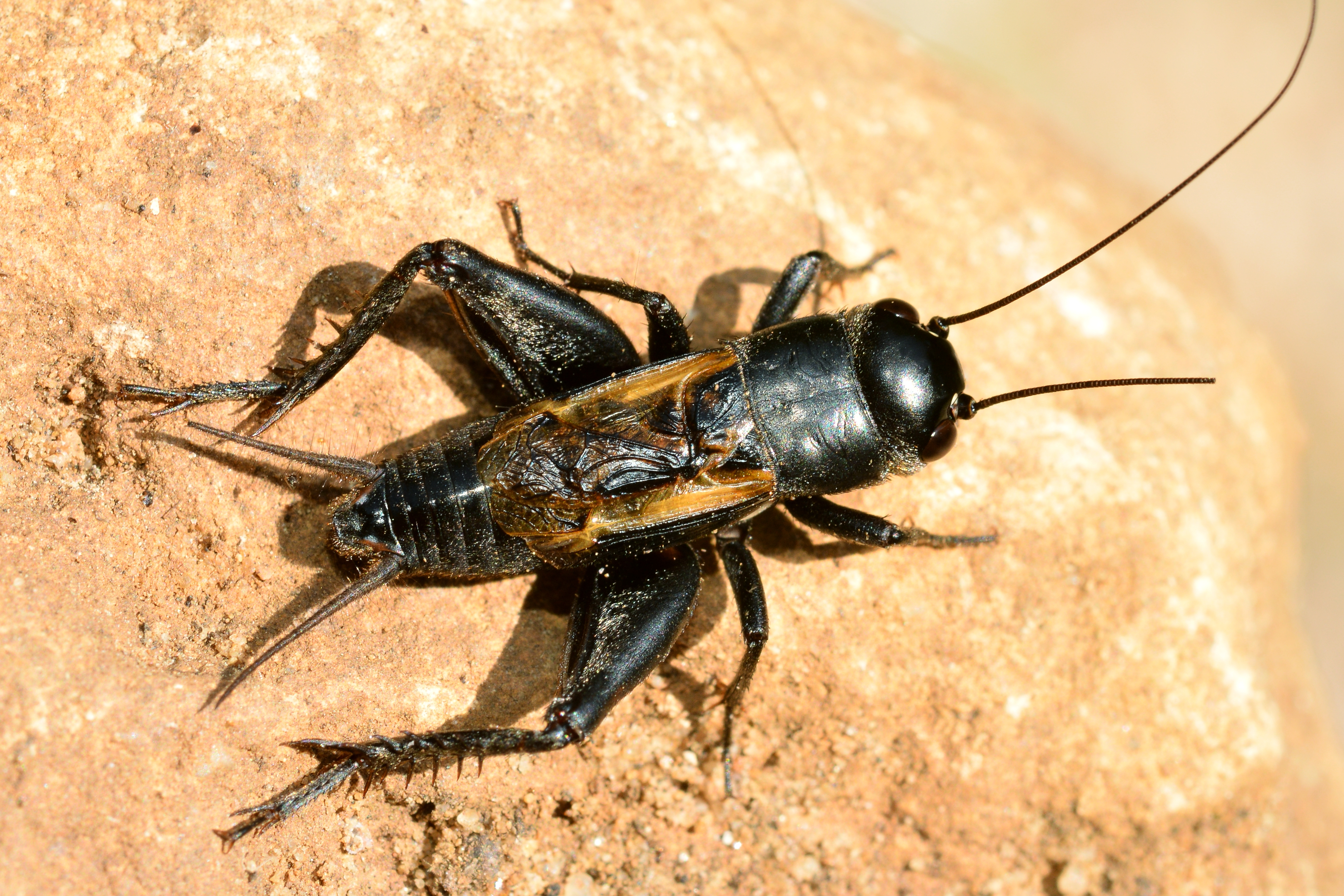

Conservation status
- Least Concern (IUCN 3.1)

Scientific classification
- Kingdom: Animalia
- Phylum: Arthropoda
- Class: Insecta
- Order: Orthoptera
- Suborder: Ensifera
- Family: Gryllidae
- Genus: Melanogryllus
- Species: M. desertus

Binomial name
- Melanogryllus desertus Pallas, 1771

= Melanogryllus desertus =

Species of cricket

Melanogryllus desertus, also known as lesser field cricket or desert cricket, is a cricket found in Europe.

== Distribution ==
This species is found in eastern Austria, Albania, Armenia, Azerbaijan, Bosnia and Hercegovina, Bulgaria, Croatia, eastern Cyprus, southern European Russia, southern France (with Corsica), Georgia, mainland Greece (with East Aegean Islands), Hungary, Italy (without Sicily and Sardinia), Kazakhstan, Kosovo, Kyrgyzstan, Moldova, Monaco, Montenegro, northeastern China (Xinjiang), North Macedonia, southern Portugal, Romania, Serbia, southern Slovakia, Slovenia, Spain (without Balearic Islands), Ukraine, eastern Uzbekistan, and western Turkey.
