= Sclerogryllus =

Scientific classification
- Domain: Eukaryota
- Kingdom: Animalia
- Phylum: Arthropoda
- Class: Insecta
- Order: Orthoptera
- Suborder: Ensifera
- Family: Gryllidae
- Subfamily: Gryllinae
- Tribe: Sclerogryllini
- Genus: Sclerogryllus; Gorochov, 1985

Synonyms
- Scleropterus Haan, 1844

Genus of crickets

External image
- Images at iNaturalist

Sclerogryllus is an Asian genus of crickets, typical of the tribe Sclerogryllini (formerly subfamily Sclerogryllinae).

== Species ==
The Orthoptera Species File lists:

1. Sclerogryllus coriaceus (Haan, 1844) – type species (as Gryllus coriaceus Haan)
2. Sclerogryllus matsuurai (Oshiro, 1988)
3. Sclerogryllus punctatus (Brunner von Wattenwyl, 1893)
4. Sclerogryllus tympanalis Yin & Liu, 1996
5. Sclerogryllus variolosus (Chopard, 1933)
