= Turanogryllus =

Scientific classification
- Domain: Eukaryota
- Kingdom: Animalia
- Phylum: Arthropoda
- Class: Insecta
- Order: Orthoptera
- Suborder: Ensifera
- Family: Gryllidae
- Subfamily: Gryllinae
- Tribe: Turanogryllini
- Genus: Turanogryllus; Tarbinsky, 1940

Synonyms
- Paragryllopsis Chopard, 1963

Genus of crickets

External image
- Images at iNaturalist

Turanogryllus is a genus of crickets in the family Gryllidae and tribe Turanogryllini. Species can be found in Africa, Greece in Europe and throughout Asia.

== Species ==
Turanogryllus includes the following species:

1. Turanogryllus aelleni Chopard, 1954
2. Turanogryllus aurangabadensis Vasanth, 1980
3. Turanogryllus babaulti Chopard, 1963
4. Turanogryllus cephalomaculatus Pajni & Madhu, 1988
5. Turanogryllus charandasi Pajni & Madhu, 1988
6. Turanogryllus dehradunensis Bhowmik, 1969
7. Turanogryllus eous Bey-Bienko, 1956
8. Turanogryllus fascifrons Chopard, 1969
9. Turanogryllus flavolateralis Chopard, 1934
10. Turanogryllus ghoshi Vasanth, 1980
11. Turanogryllus globosiceps Chopard, 1960
12. Turanogryllus gratus Gorochov, 1996
13. Turanogryllus histrio Saussure, 1877
14. Turanogryllus indicus Gorochov, 1990
15. Turanogryllus jammuensis Bhowmik, 1967
16. Turanogryllus kitale Otte, 1987
17. Turanogryllus lateralis (Fieber, 1853) - type species (as Gryllus lateralis Fieber; locality, southern Russia)
18. Turanogryllus levigatus Pajni & Madhu, 1988
19. Turanogryllus lindbergi Chopard, 1960
20. Turanogryllus machadoi Chopard, 1962
21. Turanogryllus maculithorax Chopard, 1969
22. Turanogryllus mau Otte, 1987
23. Turanogryllus melasinotus Li & Zheng, 1998
24. Turanogryllus microlyra Chopard, 1938
25. Turanogryllus mitrai Bhowmik, 1985
26. Turanogryllus niloticus Saussure, 1877
27. Turanogryllus nimba Otte, 1987
28. Turanogryllus pakistanus Ghouri & Ahmad, 1959
29. Turanogryllus rufoniger Chopard, 1925
30. Turanogryllus scorteccii Chopard, 1965
31. Turanogryllus serratospinatus Swaminathan & Meena, 2022
32. Turanogryllus sexlineatus Chopard, 1963
33. Turanogryllus sombo Otte, 1987
34. Turanogryllus stolyarovi Gorochov, 1986
35. Turanogryllus tarbinskii Bey-Bienko, 1968
36. Turanogryllus vicinus Chopard, 1967
37. Turanogryllus virgulatus Bolívar, 1900
38. Turanogryllus wahrmani Chopard, 1963
