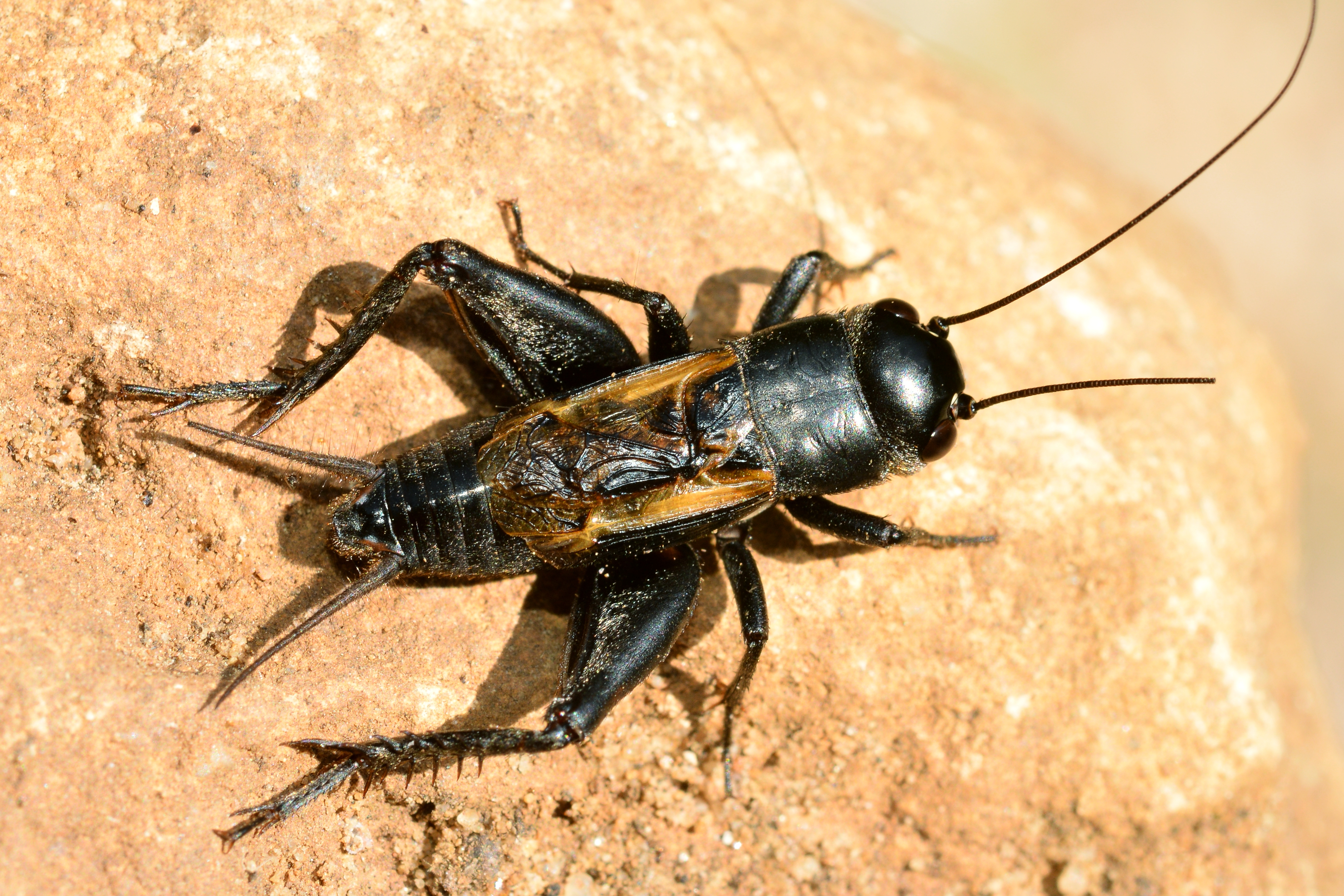
- Melanogryllus desertus

Scientific classification
- Kingdom: Animalia
- Phylum: Arthropoda
- Class: Insecta
- Order: Orthoptera
- Suborder: Ensifera
- Family: Gryllidae
- Subfamily: Gryllinae
- Tribe: Gryllini
- Genus: Melanogryllus; Chopard, 1961

= Melanogryllus =

Genus of crickets

Melanogryllus is a genus of crickets in the family Gryllidae and tribe Gryllini, erected by Lucien Chopard in 1961. Species appear to be widely distributed (but records are probably incomplete) including: North Africa, mainland Europe (not Scandinavia or the British Isles) and Asia (India, Mongolia and Taiwan).

== Species ==
The Orthoptera Species File lists:

1. Melanogryllus afghan Chopard, 1968
2. Melanogryllus bilineatus Yang & Yang, 1994
3. Melanogryllus carmichaeli (Chopard, 1928)
4. Melanogryllus chopardi Bey-Bienko, 1968
5. Melanogryllus conscitus (Walker, 1869)
6. Melanogryllus desertus (Pallas, 1771) - type species (as Gryllus desertus Pallas)
