= Gialaia =

Scientific classification
- Domain: Eukaryota
- Kingdom: Animalia
- Phylum: Arthropoda
- Class: Insecta
- Order: Orthoptera
- Suborder: Ensifera
- Family: Gryllidae
- Tribe: Gryllini
- Genus: Gialaia; Gorochov, 1994

Species
- See text

Genus of crickets

Gialaia is a genus of crickets in family Gryllidae and tribe Gryllini. A discontinuous distribution of records, between Madagascar, Indo-China and New Guinea is almost certainly incomplete.

== Taxonomy ==
The genus contains the two subgenera:

- subgenus Eugialaia Gorochov, 2001 - New Guinea
  - Gialaia calva Gorochov, 2001
  - Gialaia dichroa Gorochov, 2001
  - Gialaia monochroa Gorochov, 2001
  - Gialaia strasbergi Hugel, 2014
- subgenus Gialaia Gorochov, 1994 - Madagascar, Indo-China
  - Gialaia africana Gorochov & Kostia, 1999
  - Gialaia khaoyai Gorochov, 2001
  - Gialaia koncharangi Gorochov, 2001
  - Gialaia microptera Gorochov, 1994
  - Gialaia nhatrangi Gorochov, 2001
  - Gialaia ottei Gorochov, 1994 - type species (locality Vietnam)
  - Gialaia tamdao Gorochov, 2001
  - Gialaia thai Gorochov, 2001
