= Apterosvercus =

Scientific classification
- Domain: Eukaryota
- Kingdom: Animalia
- Phylum: Arthropoda
- Class: Insecta
- Order: Orthoptera
- Suborder: Ensifera
- Family: Gryllidae
- Tribe: Gryllini
- Genus: Apterosvercus; Gorochov, 1992

Species
- See text

Genus of crickets

Apterosvercus is a genus of cricket in family Gryllidae and tribe Gryllini. Species can be found in Indo-China (Vietnam only to date) and Malesia.

== Taxonomy ==
The genus contains the following species:

- Apterosvercus aequatorialis Gorochov, 2001
- Apterosvercus sylvestris Gorochov, 1992 - type species (A. sylvestris sylvestris)
- Apterosvercus tembelingi Gorochov, 2001
