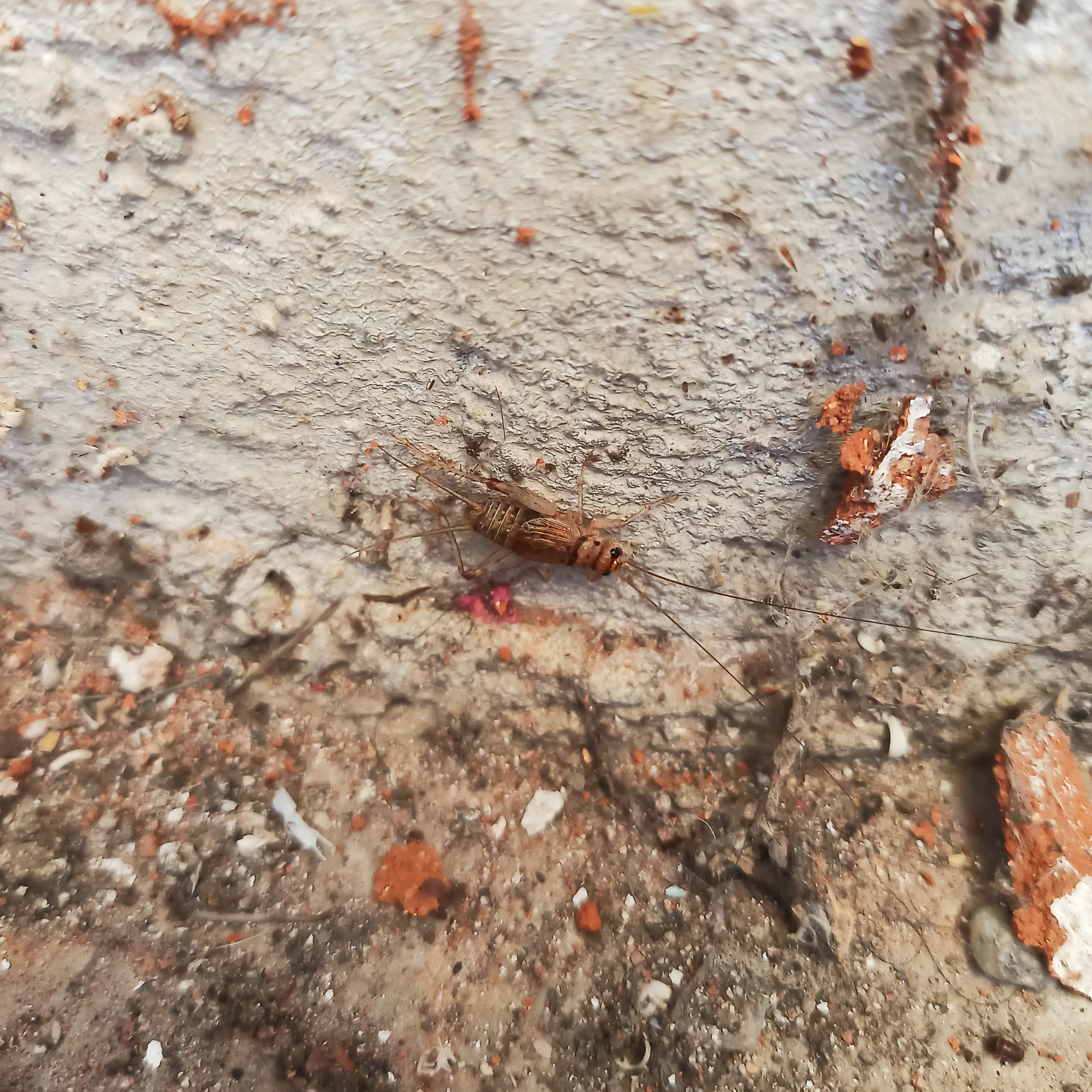
- Gryllodes sigillatus

Scientific classification
- Domain: Eukaryota
- Kingdom: Animalia
- Phylum: Arthropoda
- Class: Insecta
- Order: Orthoptera
- Suborder: Ensifera
- Family: Gryllidae
- Subfamily: Gryllinae
- Tribe: Gryllini
- Genus: Gryllodes; Saussure, 1874

Synonyms
- Gryllolandrevus Bolívar, 1922

= Gryllodes =

Genus of crickets

Gryllodes is a genus of crickets in the family Gryllidae and tribe Gryllini. Species have been recorded in Australia, Asia, Africa (Ethiopia), central Europe, subtropical and tropical Americas.

The type species, Gryllodes sigillatus, may be called the tropical or Indian house cricket: a cosmopolitan species that is cultured for pet-food.

== Species ==
Gryllodes includes the following species:

1. Gryllodes flavispina Saussure, 1877
2. Gryllodes sigillatus (Walker, 1869) - type species (as Gryllus sigillatus Walker F)
3. Gryllodes supplicans (Walker, 1859)
