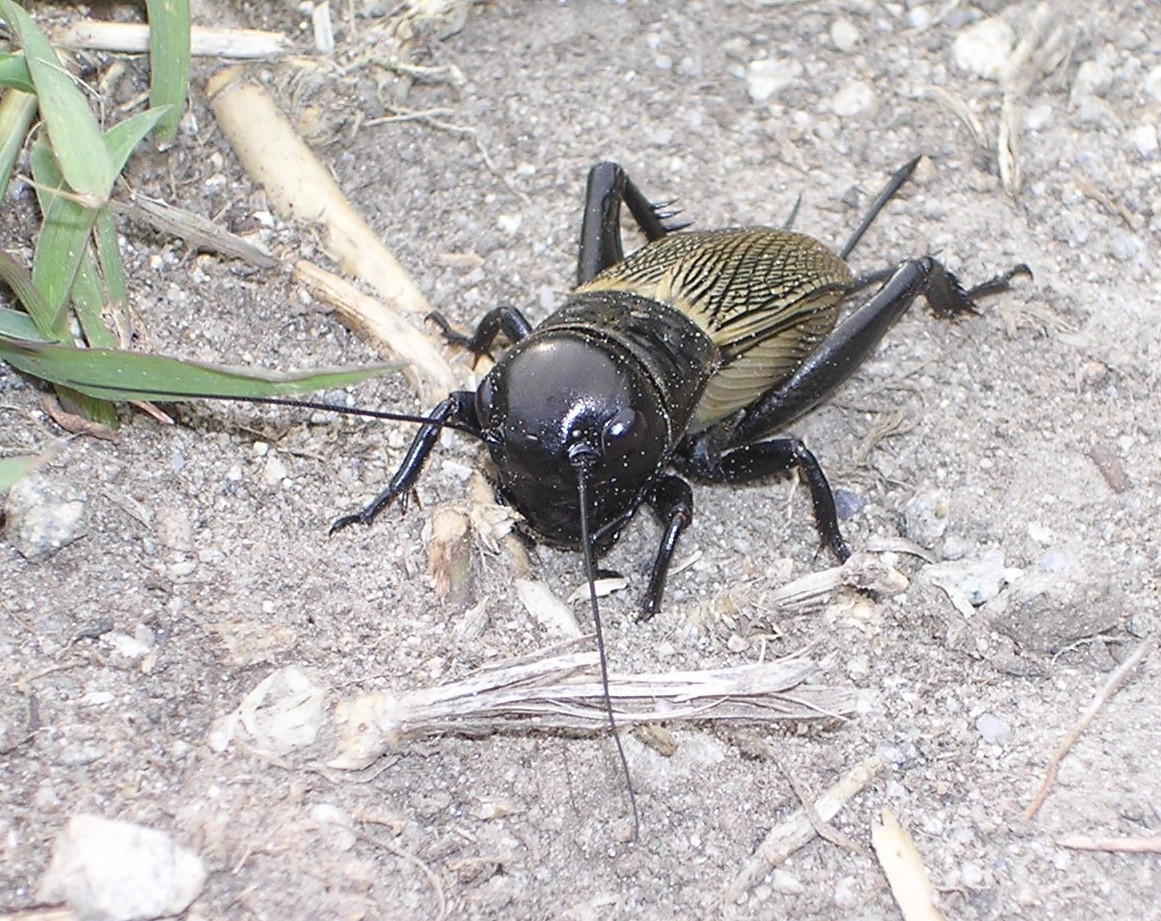

Conservation status
- Least Concern (IUCN 3.1)

Scientific classification
- Kingdom: Animalia
- Phylum: Arthropoda
- Class: Insecta
- Order: Orthoptera
- Suborder: Ensifera
- Family: Gryllidae
- Subfamily: Gryllinae
- Tribe: Gryllini
- Genus: Gryllus
- Species: G. campestris

Binomial name
- Gryllus campestris Linnaeus, 1758

Synonyms
- Gryllus campestris caudata Krauss, 1886; Gryllus cephalotes Ramme, 1921; Acheta hybrida Rambur, 1838

= Gryllus campestris =

European species of insect

Sound of Gryllus campestris
Field recording in the Netherlands 32s

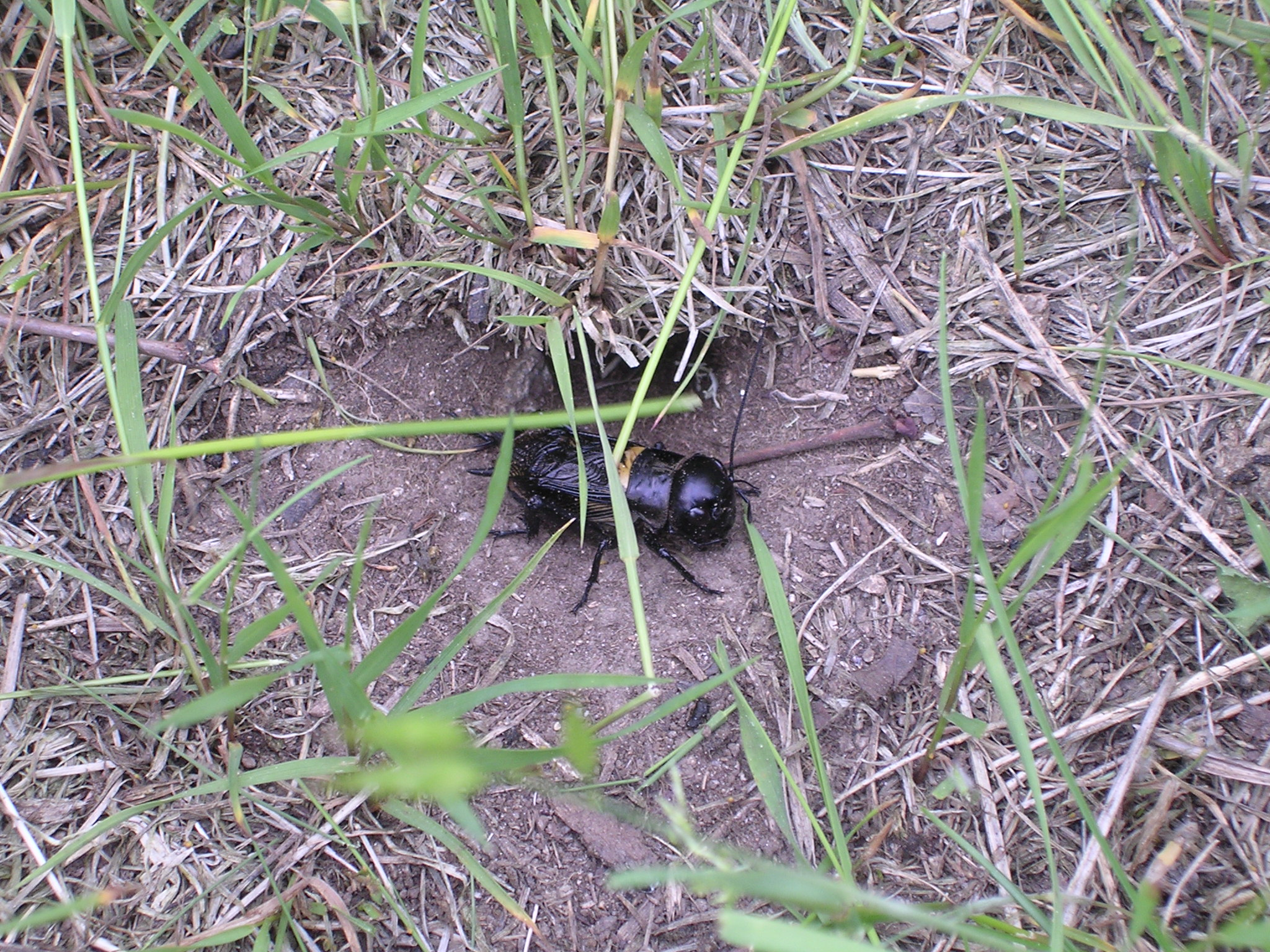
G. campestris and its burrow

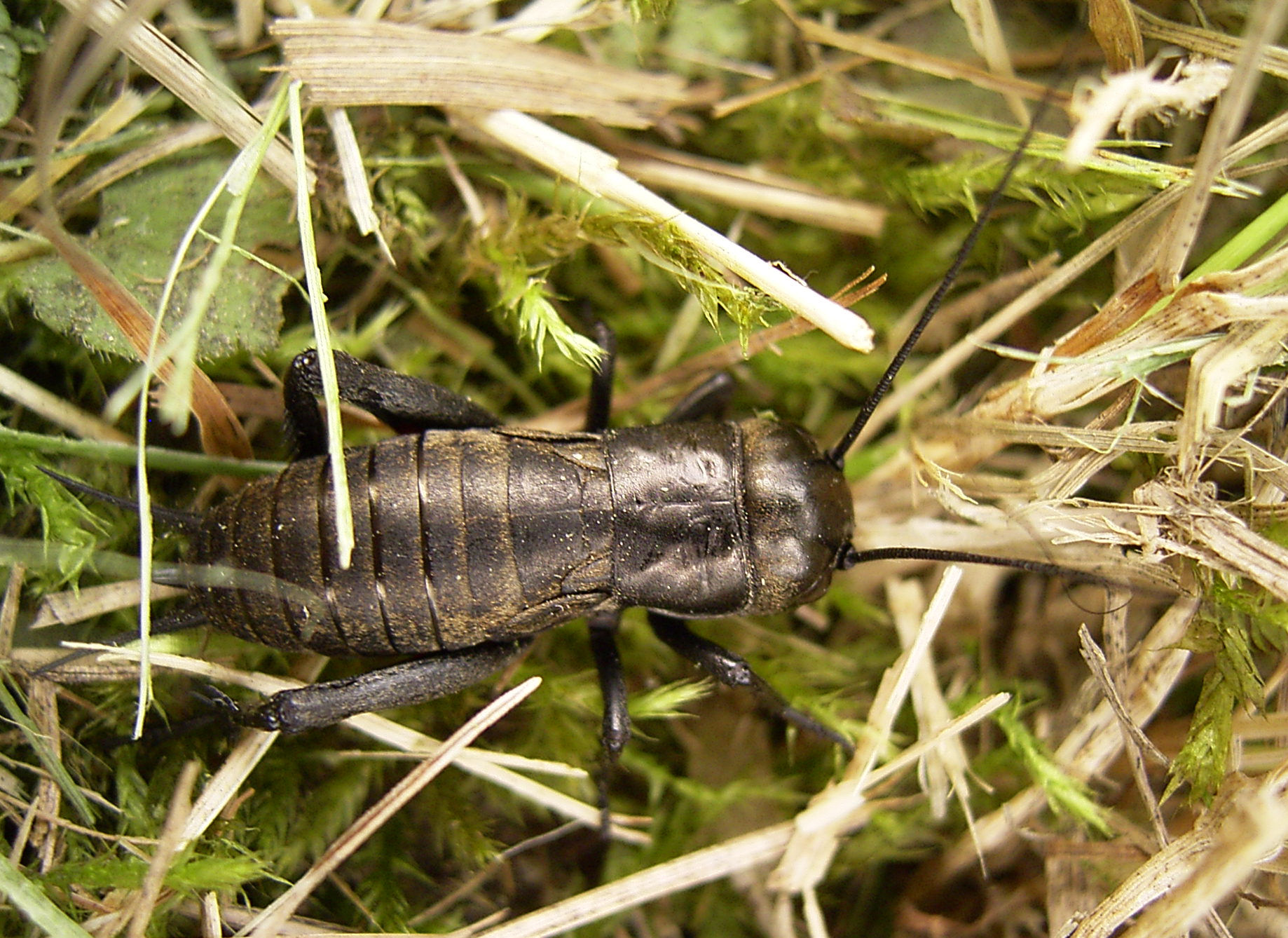
Late instar nymph

Close-up of a Gryllus campestris

Gryllus campestris, the European field cricket or simply the field cricket in the British Isles, is the type species of crickets in its genus and tribe Gryllini. These flightless dark colored insects are comparatively large; the males range from 19 to 23 mm and the females from 17 to 22 mm.

== Habitat ==
Gryllus campestris used to be common over most of Western Europe. It prefers dry, sunny locations with short vegetation, like dry grasslands. At the northern edge of its range, it is restricted to heathlands and oligotrophic grasslands. The species is flightless and unable to migrate long distances, and it therefore does not commonly recover on its own from local extinction.

== Reproduction ==
The reproductive season of the univoltine species lasts from May to July. The males make a burrow with a platform at the entrance from which they attract females with their courtship stridulation. They chirp during daytime as well as the first part of the night, only when the temperature is well above 13 °C (55 °F). Nymphs hatch in June till mid July and hibernate during their tenth or eleventh instar. The final moult takes place at the end of April or at the beginning of May. Males are territorial and defend their burrows fiercely, while females are vagrant and are attracted by singing males. They lay their eggs in bare ground either close to a burrow or inside the burrow. Populations of G. campestris are known to undergo extreme fluctuations and are strongly affected by weather conditions.

== Threats ==
Gryllus campestris has long been considered the most endangered cricket species in the British Isles, occurring only in southern England. It is declining and red-listed in large parts of Central and Northern Europe, such as the United Kingdom, Germany, the Netherlands, Belgium, Luxembourg, and Lithuania. It has declined severely in part of its northern range due to the disappearance of its heathland habitat; by the early 1990s, the species was reduced in the UK to a single surviving colony of just 100 individuals in Coates, West Sussex, and it is considered extirpated from Denmark.

== Conservation efforts ==
Fragmentation of habitats and loss of (sub)populations have been recognized as main threats for many species, including the Field cricket. The artificial establishment of new populations is, therefore, a consistent method for enhancing the survival probability of a species. The aim of translocation projects is usually to reduce the risk of extinction for an endangered species by creating additional self-sustaining populations. Studies of translocation and natural populations of G. campestris in Germany have shown that translocation does not result in a significant loss of genetic diversity. Translocation of nymphs from different subpopulations may in fact be a suitable method to decrease the loss of genetic diversity and reduce the risk of inbreeding, and large numbers of nymphs may be translocated without negative effect on the source population.

Field crickets are one of the species in the Back from the Brink project, which in 2018 translocated crickets to RSPB Pulborough Brooks to form a new population.

In April 2022, 70 crickets from Spain were introduced to an organic field near the Helford River, Cornwall. It was last recorded in Cornwall in 1906. A follow-up survey in July 2023 estimated a population of 1000.

== Sources ==
- Pearce-Kelly P, Jones R, Clarke D, Walker C, Atkin P, Cunningham AA (1998) The captive rearing of threatened Orthoptera: a comparison of the conservation potential and practical considerations of two species' breeding programmes at the Zoological Society of London. J Insect Conserv 2:201–210
- C. Venne, F. Ahnfeldt (2003) Neuansiedlung der Feldgrille (Gryllus campestris) in Bielefeld? Ber. Naturwiss. Verein für Bielefeld u. Umgegend, 43, 407–417
- S. Fischer (1994) Die Bedeutung der Wanderschäferei für den Artenaustausch zwischen isolierten Schaftriften. Diplomarbeit Univ. Marburg. FB Biologie, Naturschutz
- A. Hochkirch, K. Witzenberger, A. Teerling, F. Niemeyer (2007) Translocation of an endangered insect species, the field cricket (Gryllus campestris Linnaeus, 1758) in northern Germany. Biodivers Conserv. 16:3597–3607
