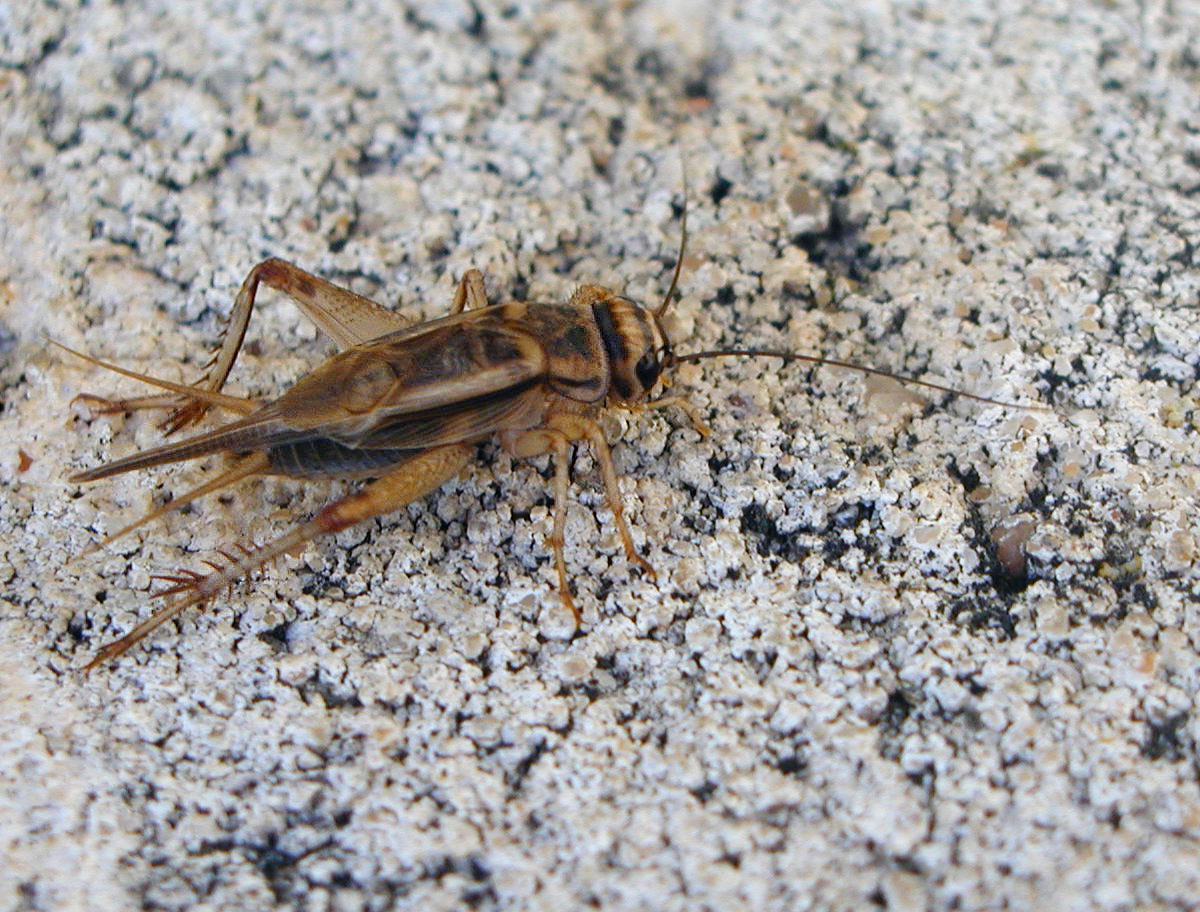
- Acheta domesticus

Scientific classification
- Kingdom: Animalia
- Phylum: Arthropoda
- Class: Insecta
- Order: Orthoptera
- Suborder: Ensifera
- Family: Gryllidae
- Subfamily: Gryllinae
- Tribe: Gryllini
- Genus: Acheta; Fabricius, 1775

Species
- See text.

Synonyms
- Acheta Linnaeus, 1758, 1758; Gryllulus Uvarov, 1935

= Acheta =

Genus of crickets

Acheta is a genus of crickets. It most notably contains the house cricket (Acheta domesticus). According to Direction 46 issued by the ICZN in 1956, this generic name is masculine in gender. Apart from the cosmopolitan house cricket, species are recorded from the Palaearctic realm and North America.

== Species ==
The Orthoptera Species File lists:

- Acheta angustiusculus Gorochov, 1993
- Acheta arabicus Gorochov, 1993
- Acheta brevipennis Chopard, 1963
- Acheta chudeaui (Chopard, 1927)
- Acheta confalonierii (Capra, 1929)
- Acheta domesticus (Linnaeus, 1758) - type species (as Gryllus domesticus Linnaeus)
- Acheta gossypii (Costa, 1855)
- Acheta hispanicus Rambur, 1838
- Acheta latiusculus Gorochov, 1993
- †Acheta marioni Théobald, 1937
- Acheta meridionalis (Uvarov, 1921)
- Acheta pachycephalus (Karsch, 1893)
- Acheta pantescus Massa, Cusimano, Fontana & Brizio, 2022
- Acheta pulchellus Gorochov, 2017
- Acheta rufopictus Uvarov, 1957
- Acheta svatoshi Gorochov, 1988
- Acheta turcomanoides Gorochov, 1993
- Acheta turcomanus Gorochov, 1978
