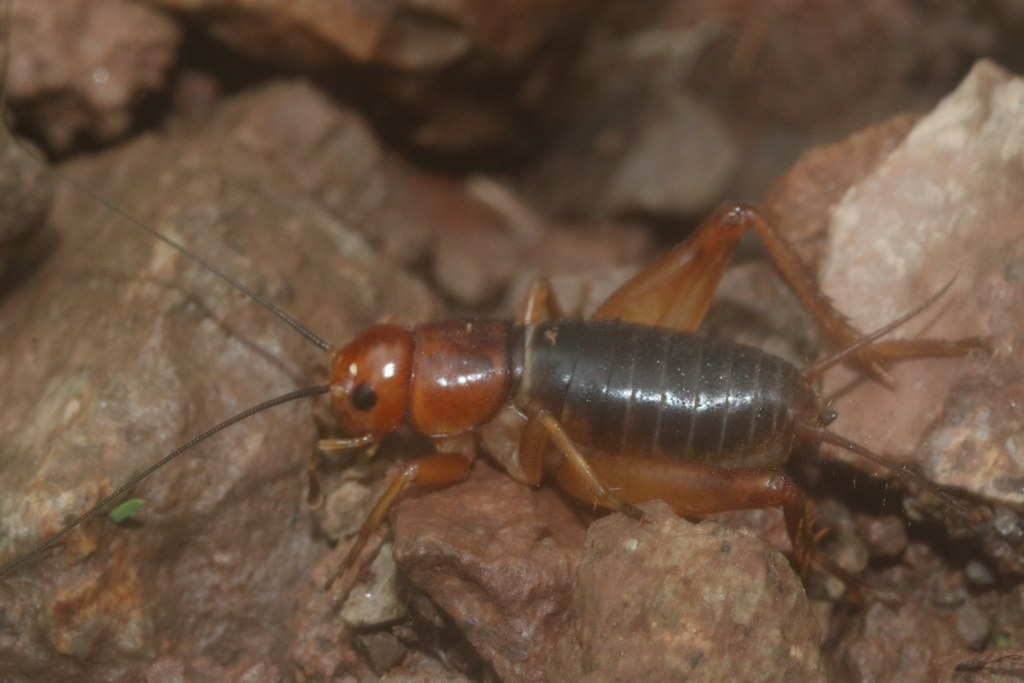
- Gryllita arizonae

Scientific classification
- Kingdom: Animalia
- Phylum: Arthropoda
- Class: Insecta
- Order: Orthoptera
- Suborder: Ensifera
- Family: Gryllidae
- Tribe: Gryllini
- Genus: Gryllita; Hebard, 1935

= Gryllita =

Genus of crickets

Gryllita is a genus of cricket in the subfamily Gryllinae. There are at least 26 species in the genus Gryllita.

== Species ==
These species belong to the genus Gryllita:

- Gryllita ametros (Otte & Perez-Gelabert, 2009)
- Gryllita amplior (Otte & Perez-Gelabert, 2009)
- Gryllita arizonae Hebard, 1935 – Arizona cricket
- Gryllita arndti Randell, 1964
- Gryllita babylas (Otte & Perez-Gelabert, 2009)
- Gryllita bondi Randell, 1964
- Gryllita chledos (Otte & Perez-Gelabert, 2009)
- Gryllita colorata (Vickery, 1997)
- Gryllita delphis (Otte & Perez-Gelabert, 2009)
- Gryllita doderoae (Gorochov & Izerskiy, 2019)
- Gryllita dosenos (Otte & Perez-Gelabert, 2009)
- Gryllita dyscheres (Otte & Perez-Gelabert, 2009)
- Gryllita excavator (Otte & Perez-Gelabert, 2009)
- Gryllita illotus (Otte & Perez-Gelabert, 2009)
- Gryllita insulanos (Otte & Perez-Gelabert, 2009)
- Gryllita jamaicensis (Otte & Perez-Gelabert, 2009)
- Gryllita lostos (Otte & Perez-Gelabert, 2009)
- Gryllita mezai (Gorochov & Izerskiy, 2019)
- Gryllita nesion (Otte & Perez-Gelabert, 2009)
- Gryllita nubilosa (Otte & Perez-Gelabert, 2009)
- Gryllita ochleros (Otte & Perez-Gelabert, 2009)
- Gryllita oryctes (Otte & Perez-Gelabert, 2009)
- Gryllita rufipes (Redtenbacher, 1892)
- Gryllita sensilis (Otte & Perez-Gelabert, 2009)
- Gryllita uhleri Randell, 1964
- Gryllita weissmani Vickery, 1993
