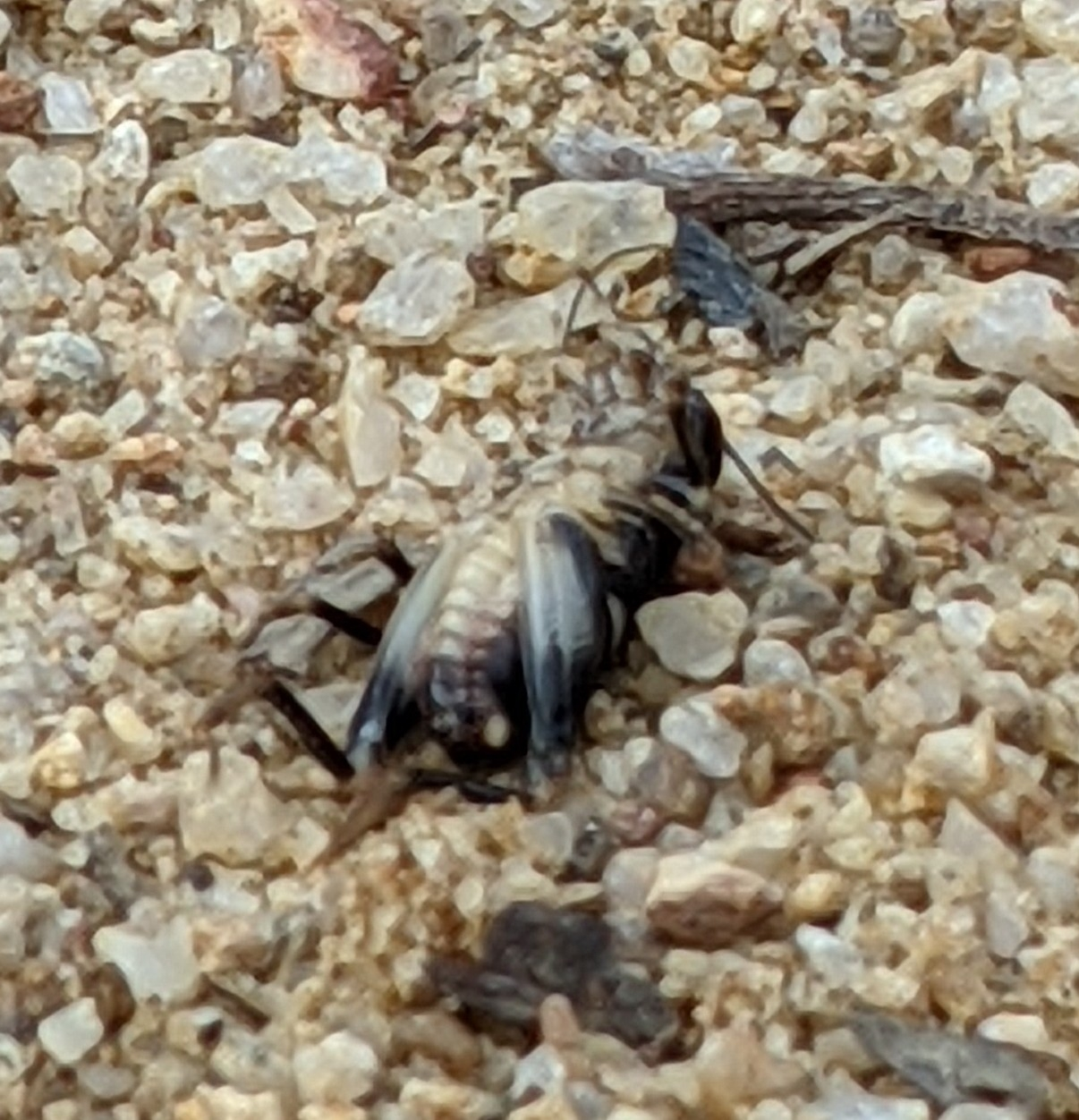

Scientific classification
- Kingdom: Animalia
- Phylum: Arthropoda
- Class: Insecta
- Order: Orthoptera
- Suborder: Ensifera
- Family: Gryllidae
- Tribe: Gryllini
- Genus: Gymnogryllus; Saussure, 1877

Species
- See text

= Gymnogryllus =

Genus of crickets

Gymnogryllus is a genus of crickets in family Gryllidae and tribe Gryllini. Species are recorded from Africa, Asia and Australia.

== Taxonomy ==
The genus contains the following species:

- Gymnogryllus amani Otte, Toms & Cade, 1988
- Gymnogryllus angustus (Saussure, 1877)
- Gymnogryllus birmanus Chopard, 1928
- Gymnogryllus borneensis Ichikawa, 1996
- Gymnogryllus brachyxiphus Chopard, 1931
- Gymnogryllus brevicauda Chopard, 1937
- Gymnogryllus brevipennis Chopard, 1934
- Gymnogryllus capensis Otte, Toms & Cade, 1988
- Gymnogryllus castaneus Bolívar, 1910
- Gymnogryllus caviceps (Karsch, 1893)
- Gymnogryllus chabanaudi Chopard, 1925
- Gymnogryllus compactus (Walker, 1869)
- Gymnogryllus contractus Liu, Yin & Liu, 1995
- Gymnogryllus corroboree Otte & Alexander, 1983
- Gymnogryllus cylindricollis (Bolívar, 1910)
- Gymnogryllus dinictis Gorochov, 2011
- Gymnogryllus dolichodens Ma & Zhang, 2011
- Gymnogryllus ebneri (Chopard, 1927)
- Gymnogryllus egorovi Gorochov, 2022
- Gymnogryllus equinus Gorochov, 2001
- Gymnogryllus extrarius Ma & Zhang, 2011
- Gymnogryllus fascipes Chopard, 1969
- Gymnogryllus joburgensis Otte, Toms & Cade, 1988
- Gymnogryllus kashmirensis Bhowmik, 1967
- Gymnogryllus kuznetzovi Gorochov, 1992
- Gymnogryllus leucostictus (Burmeister, 1838) - type species (as Gryllus elegans Guérin-Méneville)
- Gymnogryllus longus Ma & Zhang, 2011
- Gymnogryllus machairodus Gorochov, 1996
- Gymnogryllus malayanus Desutter-Grandcolas, 1996
- Gymnogryllus manokwari Gorochov, 2011
- Gymnogryllus novaeguineae Chopard, 1937
- Gymnogryllus obscurus Gorochov, 2011
- Gymnogryllus odonopetalus Xie & Zheng, 2003
- Gymnogryllus pravdini Gorochov, 1990
- Gymnogryllus pulvillatus (Saussure, 1877)
- Gymnogryllus smilodon Gorochov, 1996
- Gymnogryllus spec Burmeister, 1838
- Gymnogryllus striatus Ma & Zhang, 2011
- Gymnogryllus sylvestris Gorochov, 2011
- Gymnogryllus tumidulus Ma & Zhang, 2011
- Gymnogryllus unexpectus Gorochov & Kostia, 1999
- Gymnogryllus vicinus (Chopard, 1955)
- Gymnogryllus vietnamensis Gorochov, 1992
- Gymnogryllus yunnanensis Ma & Zhang, 2011
