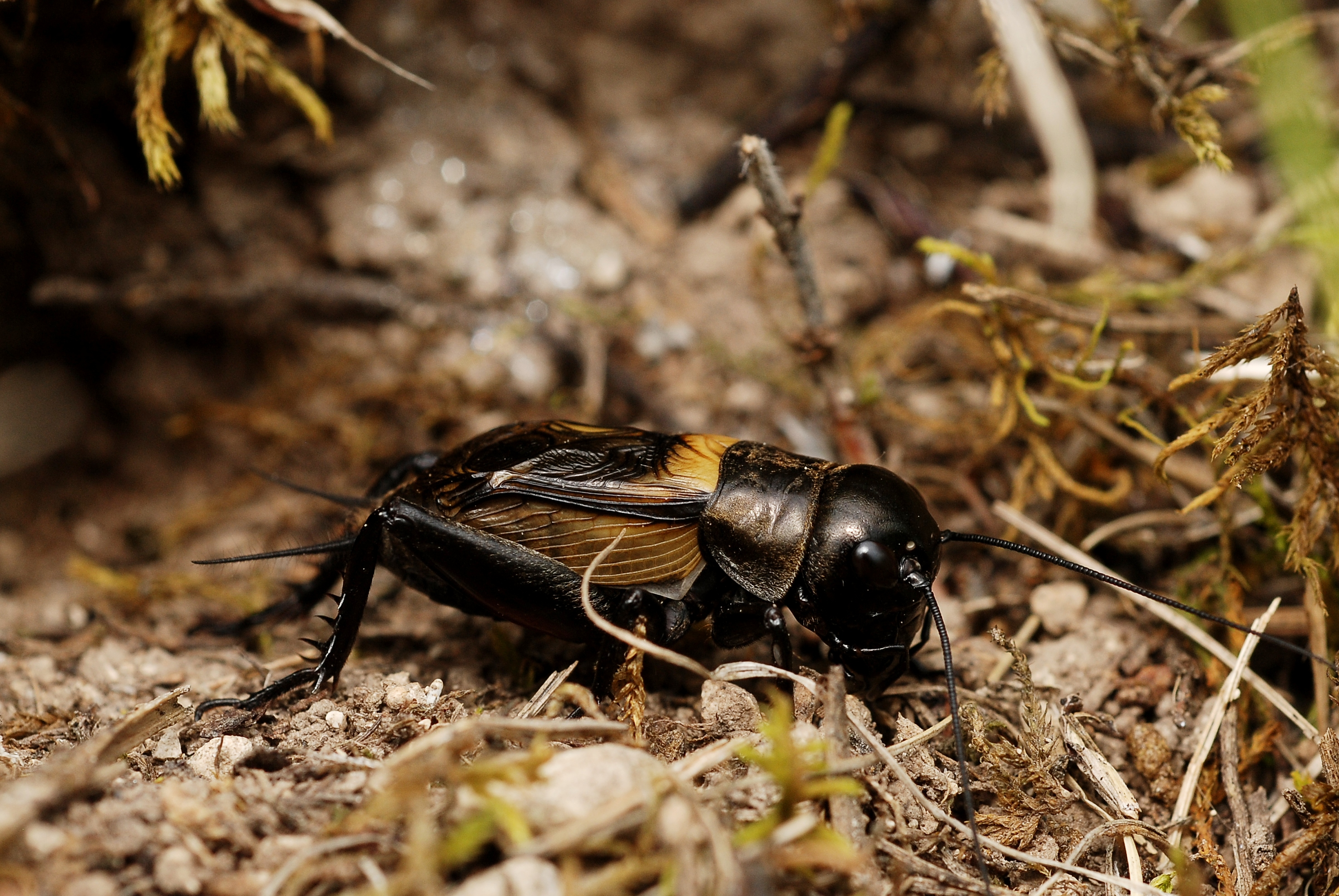
- Gryllus campestris, France

Scientific classification
- Kingdom: Animalia
- Phylum: Arthropoda
- Clade: Pancrustacea
- Class: Insecta
- Order: Orthoptera
- Suborder: Ensifera
- Family: Gryllidae
- Subfamily: Gryllinae
- Tribe: Gryllini; Laicharting, 1781

Subtribes
- Anurogryllina Randell, 1964; Brachytrupina Saussure, 1877; Cophogryllina Ichikawa, Murai & Honda, 2000; Gryllina Laicharting, 1781

Synonyms
- Acanthoplistidae Saussure, 1877; Acanthoplistii Saussure, 1877; Gymnogryllina Randell, 1964; Gymnogryllini Randell, 1964

= Gryllini =

Tribe of crickets

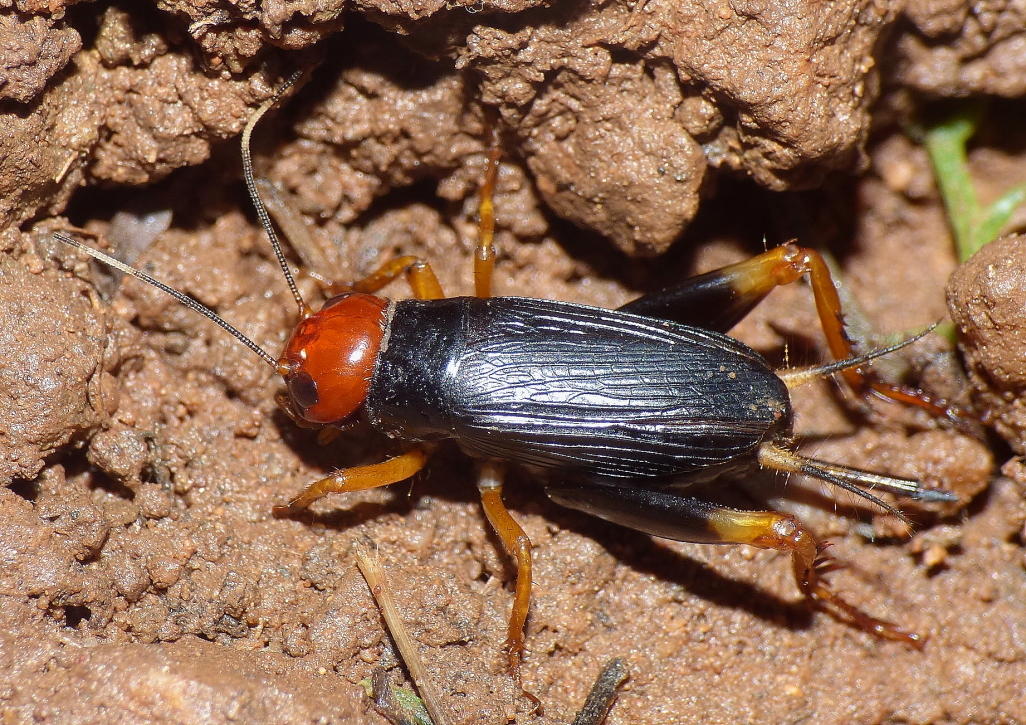
Phonarellus, India

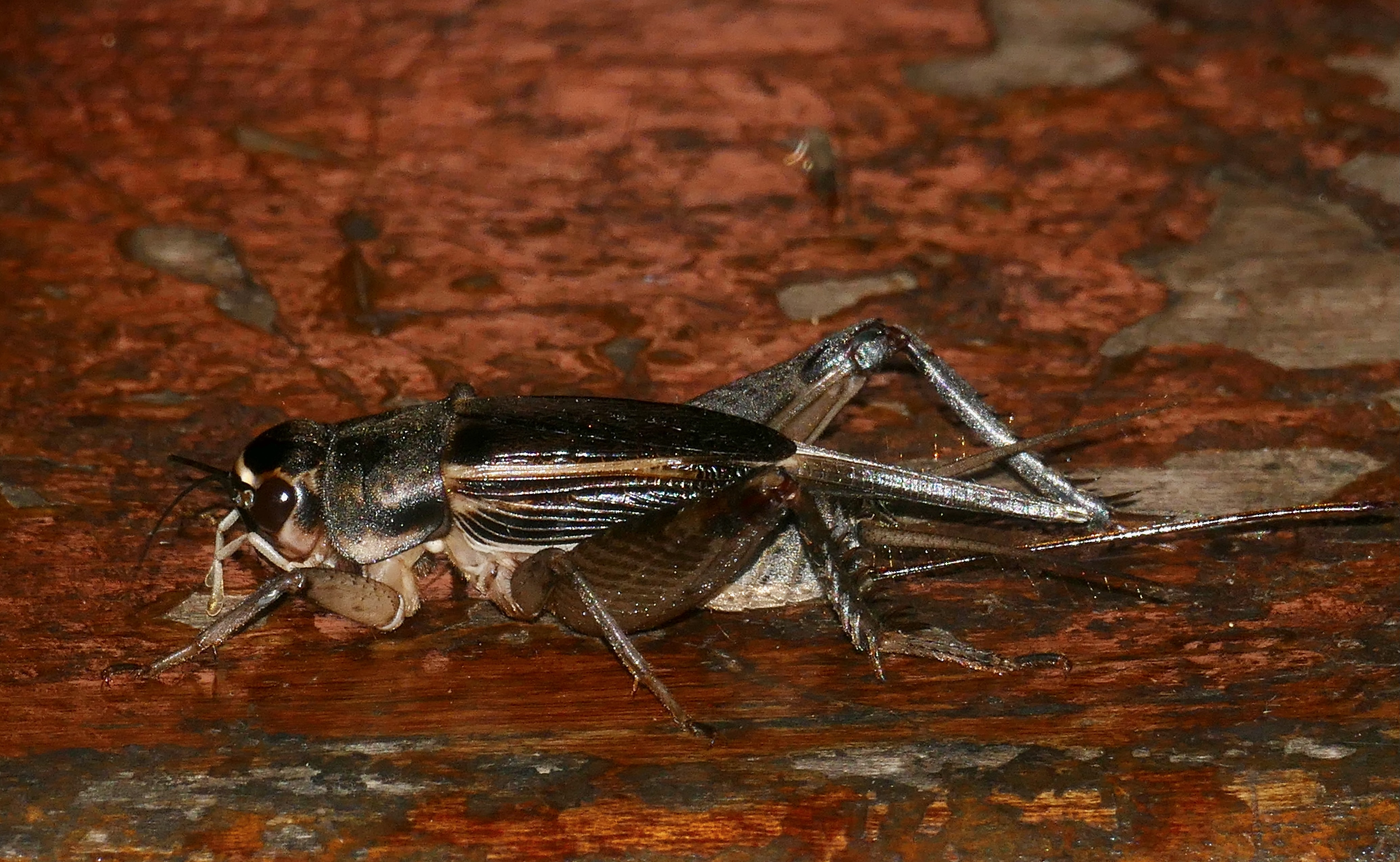
Acanthogryllus fortipes, South Africa

Gryllini is a tribe of crickets (Orthoptera: Ensifera) and typical of the family Gryllidae. Species are terrestrial, carnivorous or omnivorous and can be found in all continents except Antarctica.

Around half of the genera in this tribe are sometimes assigned to one of four subtribes: Anurogryllina, Brachytrupina, Cophogryllina, or Gryllina.

== Genera ==
These 87 genera belong to the tribe Gryllini.

- Abmisha Otte, 1987
- Acanthogryllus Saussure, 1877
- Acanthoplistus Saussure, 1877
- Acheta Fabricius, 1775
- Agryllus Gorochov, 1994
- Andeogryllus Cadena-Castañeda, 2021
- Anurogryllus Saussure, 1877 (short-tailed Crickets)
- Apiotarsus Saussure, 1877
- Apterogryllus Saussure, 1877 (wingless burrowing crickets)
- Apterosvercus Gorochov, 1992
- Atsigryllus Cadena-Castañeda & Tíjaro, 2020
- Brachytrupes Serville, 1838 (giant burrowing crickets)
- Callogryllus Sjöstedt, 1910
- Capillogryllus Xie, Zheng & Liang, 2003
- Cephalogryllus Chopard, 1925
- Clearidas Stål, 1876
- Conatrullus Gorochov, 2001
- Conoblemmus Adelung, 1910
- Conogryllus Gorochov, 2001
- Cophogryllus Saussure, 1877 (mute crickets)
- Crynculus Gorochov, 1996
- Daintria Otte, 1994 (narrow-headed crickets)
- Damaracheta Otte, 1987
- Danielottea Koçak & Kemal, 2009
- Depressogryllus Gorochov, 1988
- Doroshenkoa Gorochov, 2004
- Eugryllodes Chopard, 1927
- Faguagryllus Cadena-Castañeda, 2011
- Fodigryllus He, 2022
- Ganoblemmus Karsch, 1893
- Gialaia Gorochov, 1994
- Gigagryllus Cadena-Castañeda & García García, 2020
- Goniogryllus Chopard, 1936
- Gryllita Hebard, 1935
- Gryllodes Saussure, 1874
- Gryllus Linnaeus, 1758
- Gymnogryllus Saussure, 1877
- Hemitrullus Gorochov, 2001
- Hispanogryllus Otte & Perez-Gelabert, 2009
- Holoblemmus Bolívar, 1925
- Itarogryllus Gorochov, 2020
- Kazuemba Mello, 1990
- Kurtguentheria Gorochov, 1996
- Laureopsis Jaiswara, 2017
- Leleja Gorochov, 2016
- Loxoblemmus Saussure, 1877 (hard-headed crickets)
- Macrogryllus Saussure, 1877
- Mayumbella Otte, 1987
- Megalogryllus Chopard, 1930
- Melanogryllus Chopard, 1961
- Mellogryllus Cadena-Castañeda, Tavares & Fernandes, 2022
- Mexigryllus Gorochov, 2019
- Mimicogryllus Gorochov, 1994
- Minitrullus Gorochov, Dawwrueng & Vitheepradit, 2025
- Miogryllus Saussure, 1877 (striped crickets)
- Mirolotmia Gorochov, 2021
- Natalogryllus Gorochov & Mostovski, 2008
- Ngamarlanguia Rentz & Su, 1996
- Nigrogryllus Gorochov, 1983
- Notosciobia Chopard, 1915
- Paraloxoblemmus Karny, 1907
- Paranurogryllus Mesa & García-Novo, 1999
- Parasongella Otte, 1987
- Perugryllae Cadena-Castaneda & Garcia Garcia, 2020
- Perugryllus Jaiswara, 2017
- Pezoloxoblemmus Karny, 1907
- Phonarellus Gorochov, 1983
- Plebeiogryllus Randell, 1964
- Poliogryllus Gorochov, 1984
- Scapsipedoides Chopard, 1936
- Scapsipedus Saussure, 1877
- Sciobia Burmeister, 1838
- Sigagryllus Otte & Cade, 1984
- Sphecogryllus Chopard, 1933
- Squamigryllus Gorochov, 2001
- Svercus Gorochov, 1988
- Taciturna Otte, 1987
- Tarbinskiellus Gorochov, 1983
- Tartarogryllus Tarbinsky, 1940
- Teleogryllus Chopard, 1961 (black field crickets)
- Titanogryllus Jaiswara et al., 2018
- Trullus Gorochov, 1999
- Velarifictorus Randell, 1964
- Vietacheta Gorochov, 1992
- Zebragryllus Desutter-Grandcolas & Cadena-Castañeda, 2014
- † Eogryllus Gorochov, 2012
- † Pronemobius Scudder, 1890
