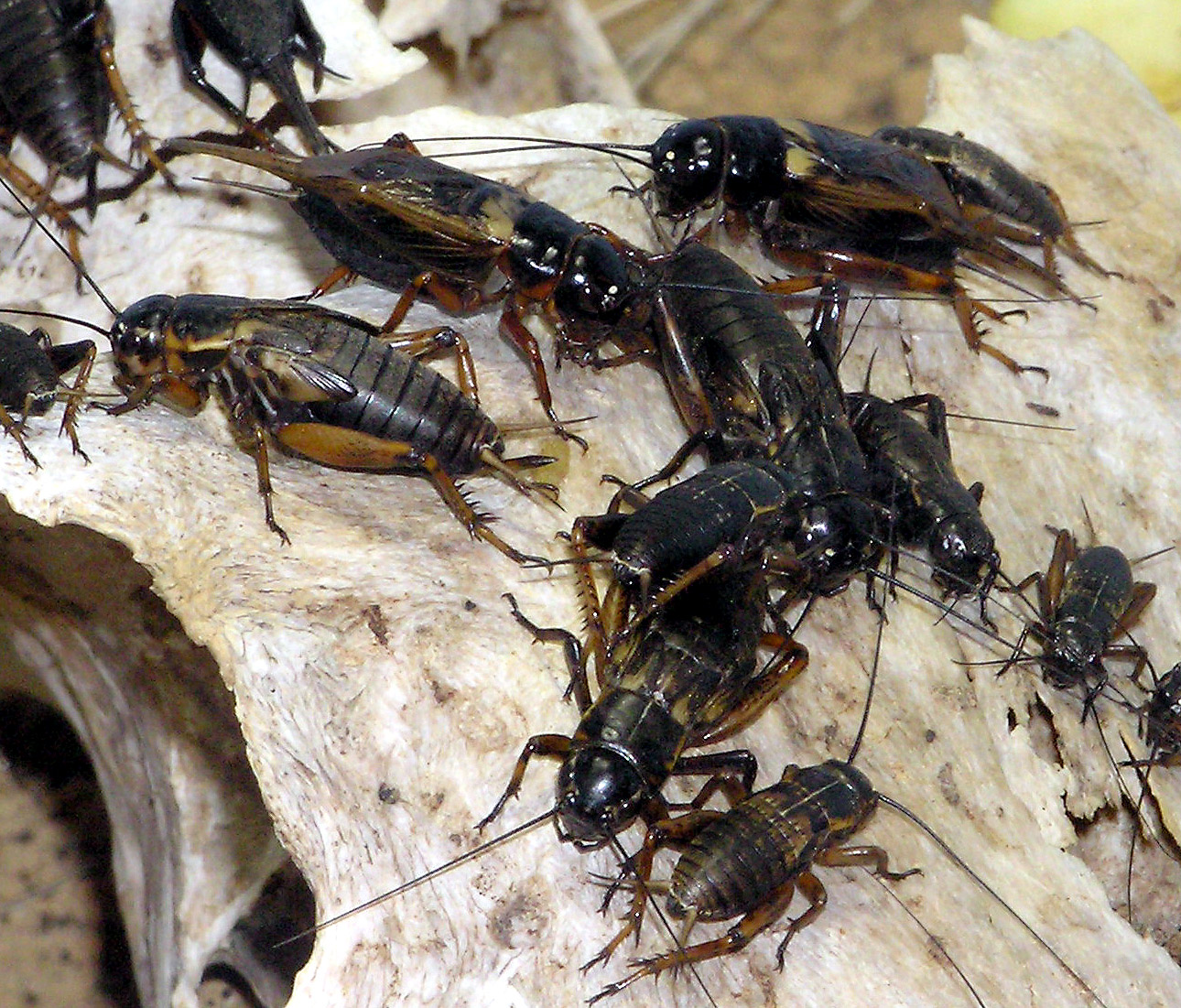

Conservation status
- Least Concern (IUCN 3.1) (Europe)

Scientific classification
- Kingdom: Animalia
- Phylum: Arthropoda
- Clade: Pancrustacea
- Class: Insecta
- Order: Orthoptera
- Suborder: Ensifera
- Family: Gryllidae
- Genus: Gryllus
- Species: G. bimaculatus

Binomial name
- Gryllus bimaculatus De Geer, 1773

= Gryllus bimaculatus =

Species of cricket

Gryllus bimaculatus is a species of cricket in the subfamily Gryllinae. Most commonly known as the two-spotted cricket, it has also been called the "African" or "Mediterranean field cricket", although its recorded distribution also includes much of Asia, including China and Indochina through to Borneo. It can be discriminated from other Gryllus species by the two dot-like marks on the base of its wings.

The species is popular for use as a food source for insectivorous animals like spiders and reptiles kept as pets or in zoos. They are easy to raise and do not require prolonged exposure to cold in order to complete their life cycle.

== Genomics ==
The first genome assembly of Gryllus bimaculatus was published in 2021, with a genome size of approximately 1.66 Gb and 17,871 annotated protein-coding genes.

A chromosome-level genome assembly of Gryllus bimaculatus was published in 2026. The genome size is approximately 1.66 Gb, with most of the assembly anchored to 15 chromosomes. The assembly has a BUSCO completeness of 98.7%, and 14,457 protein-coding genes were predicted.

== Behavior ==
=== Fighting ===
In the wild, male crickets do not tolerate one another and will fight until there is a winner. The loser usually retreats without serious injury. The fighting method involves opening the mandibles as wide as possible, gripping the opponent's mandibles and pushing with the hind legs.

Stridulation in Nature

=== Chirping ===
Male crickets of this species produce several distinctive chirps, though each sound is made by rubbing the two outer wings together. Loud and steady chirps made throughout the night are to attract females and to warn off other males. Loud fast-frequency chirps are emitted when males encounter one another and are preparing to fight. They are intended to frighten off the rival male. There are two other chirp patterns that can be observed in their mating behaviors. A soft clipping sound, 'calling' song, is made when a female is known to be nearby but in a certain distance, and more rigorous sound, 'courtship' song, is made when a female is close enough to mate (mounting on the male's back). These two songs can be easily distinguished by human ears based on its chirp patterns and frequency components.

=== Song pattern and body size ===
Whether cricket song pattern (e.g. frequency spectrum) reflect song-emitter's body size is controversial. A recent study failed to detect body-size effect on both calling and courtship songs of G. bimaculatus.

=== Shelter ===
These crickets hide under logs, in grasses, and in crevices. They also create homes by digging holes in the ground or live in holes created by other animals. Males are territorial and will fight off other males, but allow any number of females to coexist in the same shelter.

=== Cannibalism ===
Cannibalism is extremely rare, but females have been observed to eat males if there is not enough food to eat.

=== Circadian rhythm ===
Pigment Dispersing Factor has been implicated in the nocturnal rhythms of crickets.

== Life cycle ==
Females have a tubular organ at the rear, known as an ovipositor, which is used to lay eggs into the ground. They lay their eggs into humid soil or sand and hatchlings emerge from the eggs in about two weeks.

=== Mating ===
Gryllus bimaculatus exhibit polygamy. Polyandry is the most common form of polygamy practiced in G. bimaculatus. This means that female crickets will mate with more than one male. Male crickets do not exhibit polygyny. The more sperm that is deposited results in greater fertilization success because more eggs are able to hatch. The order in which various males mate with one female before fertilization also affects fertilization success. The last male that mates with a female tends to have the highest fertilization success. Traits that increase the ability of a male's sperm to successfully fertilize a female's egg compared to that of another male are most advantageous. This is because these traits have been selected for over traits that have lower fertilization success.

==== Polyandry ====
Females prefer to mate with certain males more than others, with preference for mating with new males. Female G. bimaculatus mate with at least two males before zygote production occurs. These males have to invest even more resources into each reproductive opportunity when a mate competitor is in their environment. The greater the amount of resources a male invests in producing a large amount of sperm, the greater the chances of successful fertilization.

Sperm competition also helps to prevent crickets that have genomes that are too similar from mating. Inbreeding, which is when individuals who have closely related genomes mate, decreases the viability of cricket offspring and results in offspring with lower fitness. As a result, male crickets that are genetically similar to female mates tend to be less effective in producing healthy offspring that have high fitness. Females can avoid the costs of inbreeding by selecting sperm that are not genetically similar to their eggs.

===== Novel mate hypothesis =====
Females of G. bimaculatus species prefer to mate with new, or "novel", mates. The Novel Mate hypothesis states that a female will avoid mating with males they have already mated with. The differentiation between previous mates and novel ones allows females to search for genetically superior males. Females are able to differentiate between novel and previous mates through odor cues. These are left behind by the female on the male to allow for sensory-differentiation. This self-referent chemosensory signaling is both a reliable and simple means for a female to maximize the benefits of polyandry. Females can also use palpation and antennation before mating to deduce whether or not a mate is novel.

== Use ==
Gryllus bimaculatus is widely used as feed for pet and zoo animals, especially as live food. They are also farmed or wild-caught for use in fighting in some countries, such as China, Vietnam, and Thailand.

In Vietnam, the common name for the species' males are "dế than" (coal cricket) and "dế lửa" (fire cricket), based on two common color morphs of the males. Vietnamese cricket handlers, mainly children, believed that black Gryllus bimaculatus males are more resilient in fights, while orange males (fire crickets) are stronger but back down easily. It is also said that crickets that live in abandoned snake pits would "take up" the snake's venom and be more formidable in fights.
