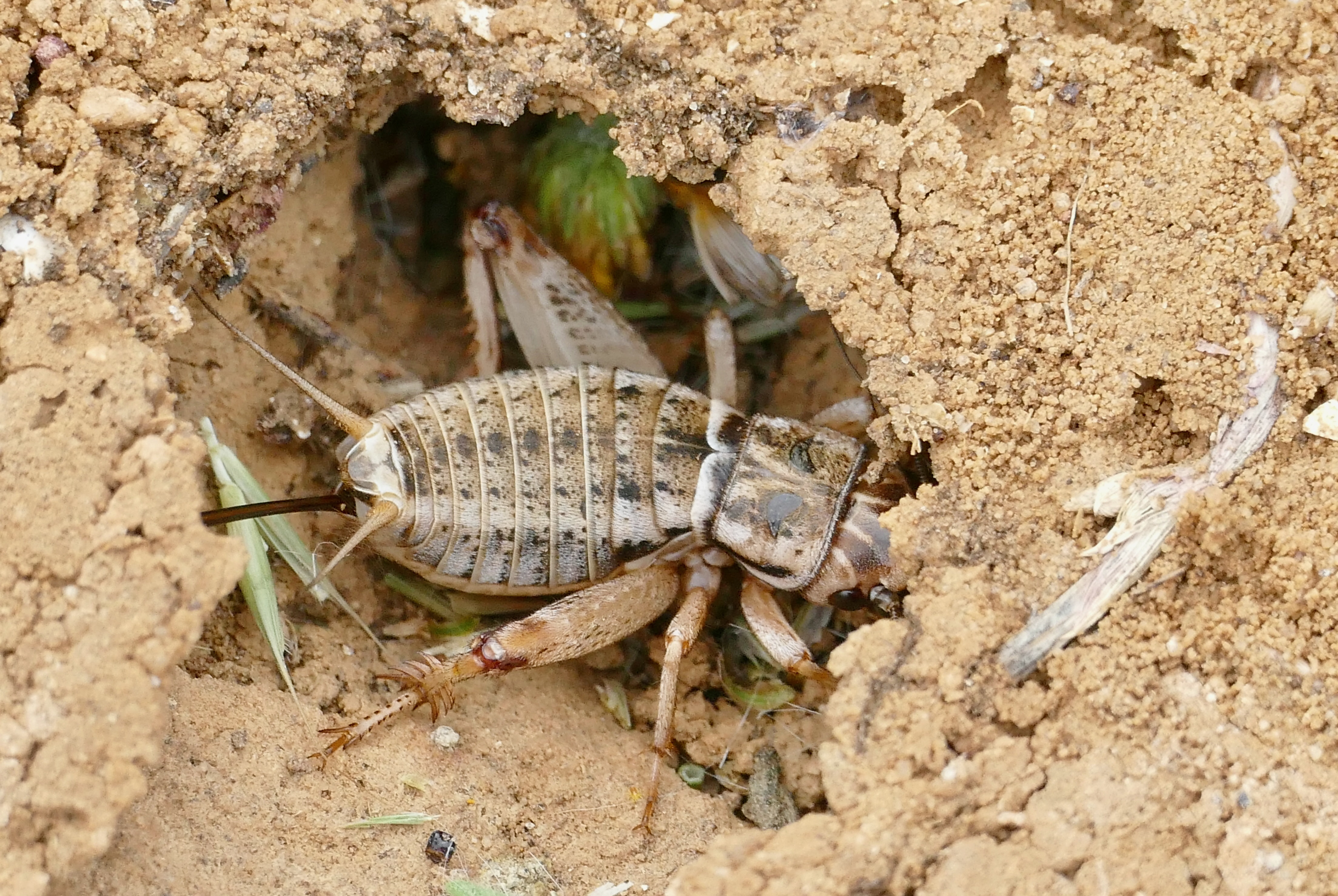

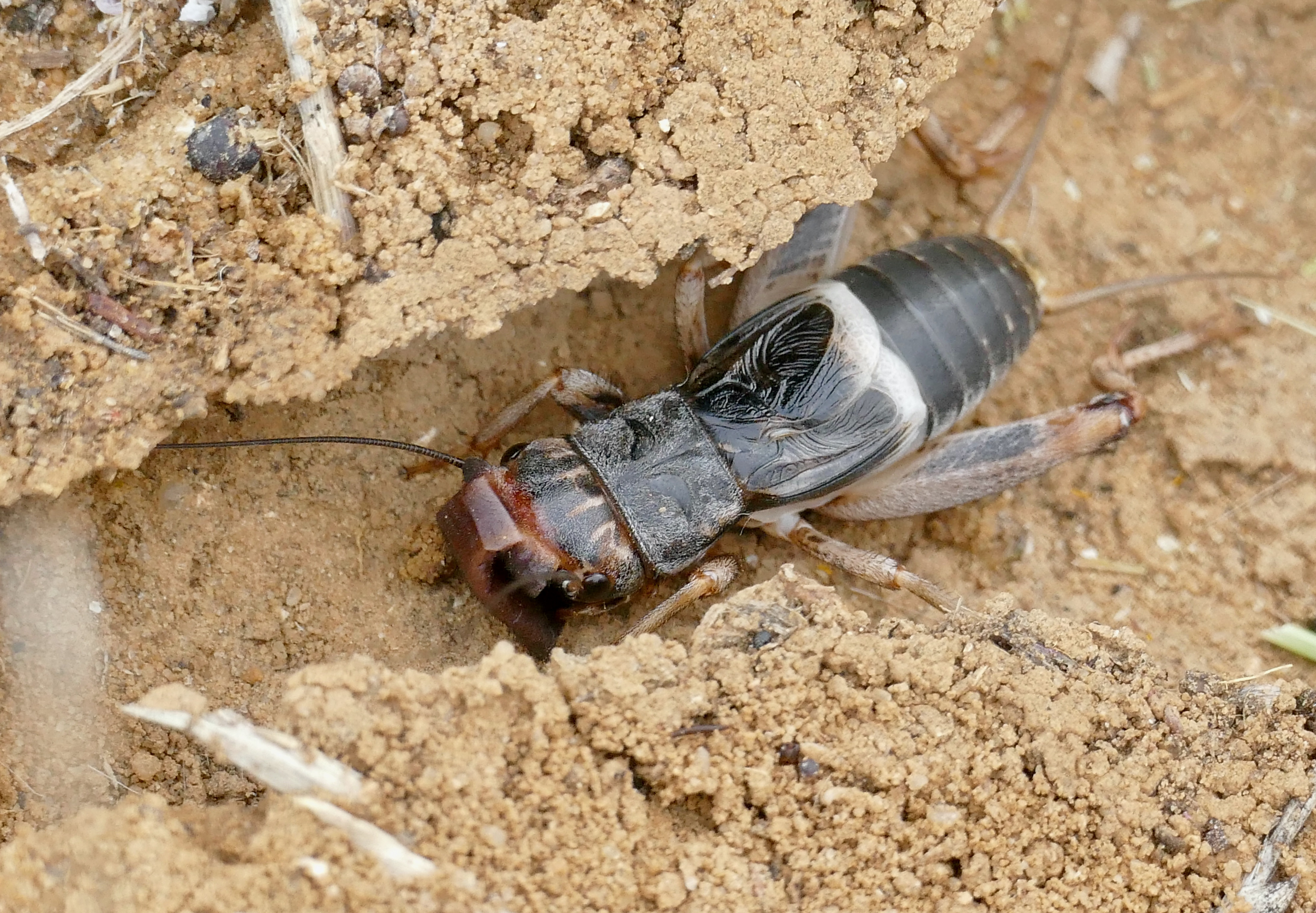
- Sciobia sp. female & male (Blalma, North of Kairouan, Tunisia)

Scientific classification
- Kingdom: Animalia
- Phylum: Arthropoda
- Class: Insecta
- Order: Orthoptera
- Suborder: Ensifera
- Superfamily: Grylloidea
- Family: Gryllidae
- Subfamily: Gryllinae
- Genus: Sciobia; Burmeister, 1838

Synonyms
- Arthroblemmus Bolívar, 1925; Lissoblemmus Bolívar, 1881; Mesoblemmus Bolívar, 1925; Mitroblemmus Bolívar, 1925; Platyblemmus Serville, 1838

= Sciobia =

Genus of crickets

External image
- Images at iNaturalist

Sciobia is a genus of crickets in the family Gryllidae and monotypic tribe Sciobiini; it was erected by Hermann Burmeister in 1838. Species can be found in NW Africa and the Iberian Peninsula.

== Species ==
The Orthoptera Species File includes:

subgenus Sciobia Burmeister, 1838

1. Sciobia algirica (Gogorza, 1881)
2. Sciobia alluaudi (Bolívar, 1925)
3. Sciobia appunctata (Bolívar, 1912)
4. Sciobia azruensis (Bolívar, 1925)
5. Sciobia barbara (Saussure, 1877)
6. Sciobia batnensis (Finot, 1893)
7. Sciobia bolivari (Chopard, 1937)
8. Sciobia boscai Bolívar, 1925
9. Sciobia bouvieri Bolívar, 1925
10. Sciobia cephalotes (Bolívar, 1925)
11. Sciobia chevreuxi Bolívar, 1925
12. Sciobia chopardi (Bolívar, 1925)
13. Sciobia cinerea (Chopard, 1943)
14. Sciobia escalerai Bolívar, 1925
15. Sciobia finoti (Brunner von Wattenwyl, 1882)
16. Sciobia gogorzai (Bolívar, 1912)
17. Sciobia longicauda Gaillat-Airoldi, 1939
18. Sciobia luctuosa (Gogorza, 1881)
19. Sciobia lusitanica (Rambur, 1838) type species (as Platyblemmus lusitanicus Rambur, by subsequent designation)
20. Sciobia maria Gorochov, 1985
21. Sciobia mauretanicus (Saussure, 1898)
22. Sciobia mazarredoi (Bolívar, 1881)
23. Sciobia melillensis Bolívar, 1912
24. Sciobia micropsycha (Bolívar, 1912)
25. Sciobia mitrata (Saussure, 1898)
26. Sciobia polita Bolívar, 1925
27. Sciobia praticola (Bolívar, 1884)
28. Sciobia riffensis (Morales-Agacino, 1956)
29. Sciobia tatiana Gorochov, 1985
30. Sciobia tristis (Bolívar, 1925)
31. Sciobia umbraculata (Linnaeus, 1758)
32. Sciobia uvarovi (Bolívar, 1925)
33. Sciobia viettei Chopard, 1958

subgenus Thliptoblemmus Saussure, 1898

1. Sciobia caliendra (Fischer, 1853)
2. Sciobia foreli (Saussure, 1898)
3. Sciobia hybrida (Saussure, 1898)
4. Sciobia natalia Gorochov, 1985
