= Sclerogryllini =

Scientific classification
- Domain: Eukaryota
- Kingdom: Animalia
- Phylum: Arthropoda
- Class: Insecta
- Order: Orthoptera
- Suborder: Ensifera
- Superfamily: Grylloidea
- Family: Gryllidae
- Subfamily: Gryllinae
- Tribe: Sclerogryllini; Gorochov, 1985

Synonyms
- Sclerogryllinae Gorochov, 1985; Scleropteridae Saussure, 1877; Scleropterinae Saussure, 1877; Scleropterites Saussure, 1877

Tribe of crickets

External image
- Images at iNaturalist

The Sclerogryllini, formerly subfamily Sclerogryllinae, are a tribe of crickets, now placed in the subfamily Gryllinae and based on the only extant, type genus Sclerogryllus. They may be known as "stiff-winged crickets" and are terrestrial insects, distributed in: India, Indochina, west Malesia, China, Korea and Japan.

== Genera ==
The Orthoptera Species File lists:

subtribe Pherodactylina Cadena-Castañeda & He, 2023

- †Burmagryllotalpa Wang, Lei, Zhang, Xu, Fang & Zhang, 2019
- †Pherodactylus Poinar, Su & Brown, 2020

subtribe Sclerogryllina Gorochov, 1985

- Sclerogryllus Gorochov, 1985 – type genus

Note: the African monotypic genus Rhabdotogryllus Chopard, 1954 is now incertae sedis in subfamily group Gryllinae.
