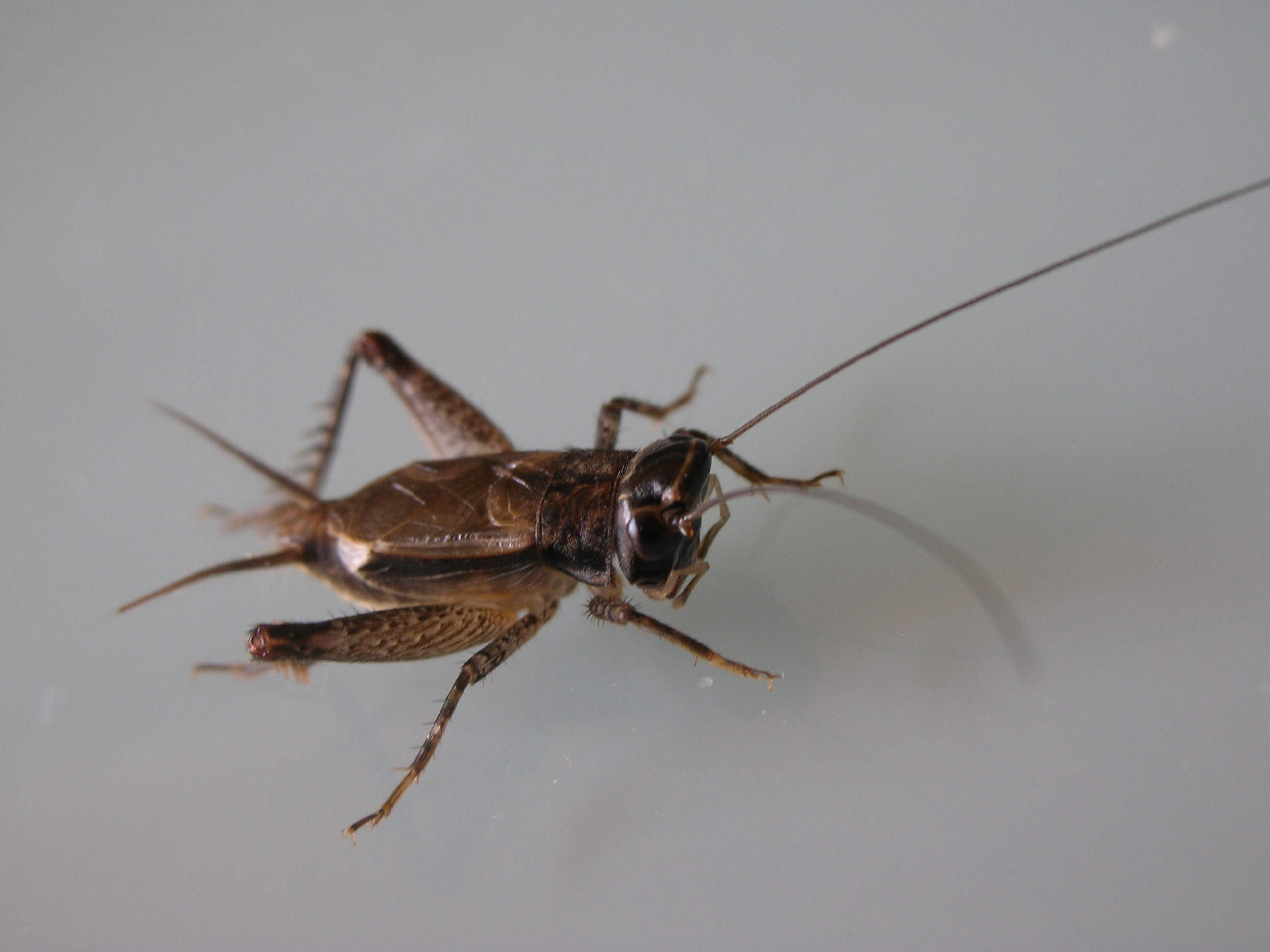
- Loxoblemmus magnatus

Scientific classification
- Domain: Eukaryota
- Kingdom: Animalia
- Phylum: Arthropoda
- Class: Insecta
- Order: Orthoptera
- Suborder: Ensifera
- Family: Gryllidae
- Tribe: Gryllini
- Genus: Loxoblemmus; Saussure, 1877

Species
- See text

= Loxoblemmus =

Genus of crickets

Loxoblemmus is a genus of crickets in tribe Gryllini. Species can be found in Africa, Asia and Australia.

== Taxonomy ==
Genus contains the following species:

- Loxoblemmus abotus Wang, 1992
- Loxoblemmus adina (Otte & Alexander, 1983)
- Loxoblemmus angolensis Chopard, 1962
- Loxoblemmus angulatus Bey-Bienko, 1956
- Loxoblemmus animae Bhowmik, 1967
- Loxoblemmus aomoriensis Shiraki, 1930
- Loxoblemmus appendicularis Shiraki, 1930
- Loxoblemmus arietulus Saussure, 1877
  - synonym L. campestris Matsuura, 1988
- Loxoblemmus beybienkoi Bhowmik, 1977
- Loxoblemmus billabongus (Otte & Alexander, 1983)
- Loxoblemmus bilo (Otte & Alexander, 1983)
- Loxoblemmus binyaris (Otte & Alexander, 1983)
- Loxoblemmus brevipalpus Wang, 1992
- Loxoblemmus brevipennis Chopard, 1938
- Loxoblemmus cavifrons Chopard, 1928
- Loxoblemmus chopardi Roy, 1965
- Loxoblemmus consanguineus (Chopard, 1962)
- Loxoblemmus dallacheus (Otte & Alexander, 1983)
- Loxoblemmus descarpentriesi Chopard, 1967
- Loxoblemmus detectus (Serville, 1838)
- Loxoblemmus difficilis Gorochov, 1994
- Loxoblemmus doenitzi Stein, 1881
- Loxoblemmus ellerinus (Otte & Alexander, 1983)
- Loxoblemmus equestris Saussure, 1877
  - type species
- Loxoblemmus escalerai Bolívar, 1910
- Loxoblemmus fletcheri Chopard, 1935
- Loxoblemmus formosanus Shiraki, 1930
- Loxoblemmus globiceps Gorochov, 2001
- Loxoblemmus haanii Saussure, 1877
- Loxoblemmus intermedius Chopard, 1929
- Loxoblemmus jabbarupus (Otte & Alexander, 1983)
- Loxoblemmus jacobsoni Chopard, 1927
- Loxoblemmus latifrons Chopard, 1928
- Loxoblemmus longipalpis Chopard, 1928
- Loxoblemmus macrocephalus Chopard, 1967
- Loxoblemmus magnatus Matsuura, 1985
- Loxoblemmus marookus (Otte & Alexander, 1983)
- Loxoblemmus mirio Gorochov, 1996
- Loxoblemmus monstrosus Stål, 1877
- Loxoblemmus neoarietulus Wang, 1992
- Loxoblemmus nigriceps Chopard, 1933
- Loxoblemmus nurroo Otte & Alexander, 1983
- Loxoblemmus pallens (Serville, 1838)
- Loxoblemmus parabolicus Saussure, 1877
- Loxoblemmus peraki Gorochov, 2001
- Loxoblemmus rectilineus Ma & Qiao, 2020
- Loxoblemmus reticularus Liu, Yin & Liu, 1995
- Loxoblemmus sagonai Chopard, 1934
- Loxoblemmus spectabilis Gorochov & Kostia, 1993
- Loxoblemmus subangulatus Yang, 1992
- Loxoblemmus sylvestris Matsuura, 1988
- Loxoblemmus taicoun Saussure, 1877
- Loxoblemmus timliensis Bhargava, 1982
- Loxoblemmus truncatus Brunner von Wattenwyl, 1893
- Loxoblemmus tsushimensis Ichikawa, 2001
- Loxoblemmus verschuereni Chopard, 1938
- Loxoblemmus villiersi Chopard, 1967
- Loxoblemmus vividus (Sjöstedt, 1900)
- Loxoblemmus whyallus (Otte & Alexander, 1983)
- Loxoblemmus yingally (Otte & Alexander, 1983)
