= Gryllinae =

- Common black cricket, Gryllus assimilis

Scientific classification
- Kingdom: Animalia
- Phylum: Arthropoda
- Clade: Pancrustacea
- Class: Insecta
- Order: Orthoptera
- Suborder: Ensifera
- Family: Gryllidae
- Subfamily: Gryllinae; Saussure, 1893

Genera
- Many, see text

Subfamily of crickets

Gryllinae, or field crickets, are a subfamily of insects in the order Orthoptera and the family Gryllidae.

They hatch in spring, and the young crickets (called nymphs) eat and grow rapidly. They shed their skin (molt) eight or more times before they become adults.

Field crickets eat a broad range of food: seeds, plants, or insects (dead or alive). They are known to feed on grasshopper eggs, pupae of Lepidoptera (moths and butterflies) and Diptera (flies). Occasionally they may rob spiders of their prey. Field crickets also eat grass.

In the British Isles "field cricket" refers specifically to Gryllus campestris, but the common name may also be used for G. assimilis, G. bimaculatus, G. firmus, G. pennsylvanicus, G. rubens, and G. texensis, along with other members of various genera including Acheta, Gryllodes, Gryllus, and Teleogryllus. Acheta domesticus, the House cricket, and Gryllus bimaculatus are raised in captivity for use as pets.

== Identification ==
Field crickets are normally 15–25 millimetres (0.6–1.0 in) in size, depending on the species, and can be black, red or brown in color. While both males and females have very similar basic body plans, each has its own distinguishing feature(s).

Females can be identified by the presence of an ovipositor, a spike-like appendage, about 0.75 inches (19 mm) long, on the hind end of the abdomen between two cerci. This ovipositor allows the female to bury her fertilized eggs into the ground for protection and development. In some female field crickets, species can be distinguished by comparing the length of the ovipositor to the length of the body (e.g., G. rubens has a longer ovipositor than G. texensis).

Males are distinguished from females by the absence of an ovipositor. At the end of the abdomen there are simply two cerci. Unlike females, however, males are able to produce sounds or chirps. Thus, males can be identified through sound while females cannot.

Diagram A shows the male cricket with its wings raised for the purpose of chirping. Diagram B shows the female cricket, identified via the long protruding ovipositor at the end of the abdomen. D and E show the female using the ovipositor to deposit the fertilized eggs into the ground. Diagram C shows a topical and side view of nymphs with no protrusion at the hind of the abdomen.

== Behaviour ==
In ambient temperatures between 80 °F (27 °C) and 90 °F (32 °C) sexually mature males will chirp, with the acoustical properties of their calling song providing an indicator of past and present health. Females evaluate these songs and move towards the ones that signal the male's good health. When the male senses the presence of a female he will produce a softer courting song. After mating, the female will search for a place to lay her eggs, preferably in warm, damp (though not wet) soil.

Field crickets prefer to live in outdoor environments with high humidity, warm temperatures, moist rich soil, and adequate food, but will migrate into human structures when environmental conditions outside become unfavorably cool. They often gain entry into buildings via open doors and windows as well as cracks in poorly fitted windows, foundations, or siding.

This female field cricket was seen in Ohio in September.

Unlike House crickets, which can adapt themselves to indoor conditions, populations of field crickets living in human structures and buildings and without access to warm moist soil for depositing their eggs tend to die out within a few months. Consequently, field crickets in temperate regions exhibit diapause.

The calling song of a field cricket

== Tribes and selected genera ==
The following tribes have been identified in this subfamily:

=== Cephalogryllini ===
Auth.: Otte & Alexander, 1983 - Australia

- Apterogryllus Saussure, 1877
- Cephalogryllus Chopard, 1925
- Daintria Otte, 1994
- Notosciobia Chopard, 1915

=== Eurygryllodini ===
Auth.: Gorochov, 1990 - Australia

- Eurygryllodes Chopard, 1951
- Maluagryllus Otte, 1994

=== Gryllini ===
Worldwide, selected genera include:

- Acheta Fabricius, 1775
- Brachytrupes Serville, 1838
- Gryllodinus Bolívar, 1927
- Gryllita Hebard, 1935
- Gryllodes Saussure, 1874
- Gryllus Linnaeus, 1758
- Gymnogryllus Saussure, 1877
- Loxoblemmus Saussure, 1877
- Melanogryllus Chopard, 1961
- Miogryllus Saussure, 1877
- Teleogryllus Chopard, 1961

=== Modicogryllini ===
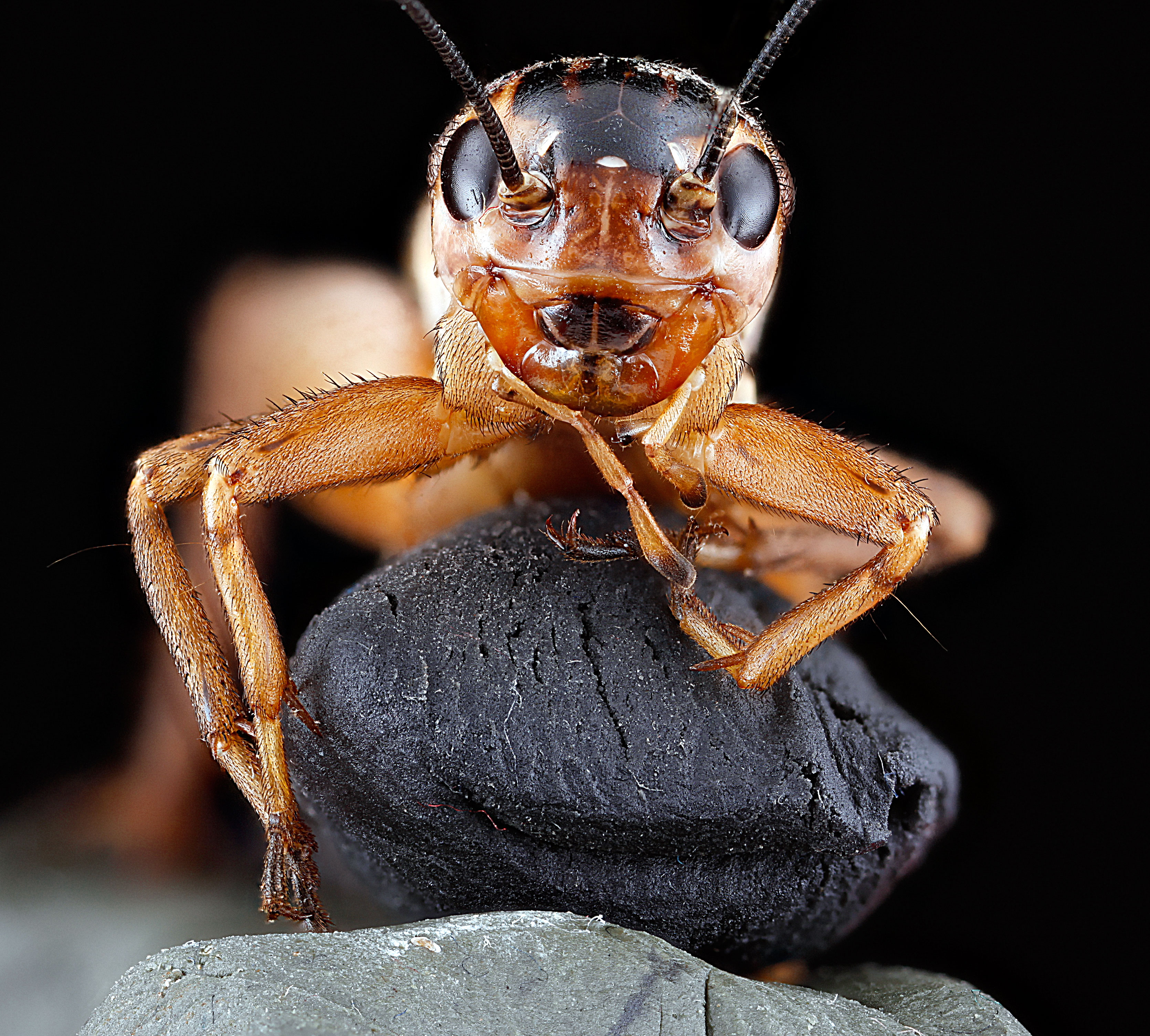
Velarifictorus micado front

Worldwide except the Americas, selected genera include:

- Eumodicogryllus Gorochov, 1986
- Lepidogryllus Otte & Alexander, 1983
- Modicogryllus Chopard, 1961
- Velarifictorus Randell (1964)

=== Sciobiini ===
Auth.: Randell, 1964 - NW Africa, Iberian peninsula

- Sciobia Burmeister, 1838

=== Sclerogryllini ===
Auth.: Gorochov, 1985 - Asia and extinct (2 subtribes)

- Sclerogryllus Gorochov, 1985

=== Turanogryllini ===
Auth.: Otte, 1987 - Africa, SE Europe, Middle East, southern Asia through to Korea and Indo-China

- Neogryllopsis Otte, 1983
- Podogryllus Karsch, 1893
- Turanogryllus Tarbinsky, 1940

=== Genera incertae sedis ===
- Allogryllus Chopard, 1925
- Apiotarsus Saussure, 1877
- Callogryllus Sjöstedt, 1910
- Coiblemmus Chopard, 1936
- Comidoblemmus Storozhenko & Paik, 2009
- Cryncus Gorochov, 1983
- Danielottea Koçak & Kemal, 2009
- Gryllodeicus Chopard, 1939
- Grylloderes Bolívar, 1894
- Hispanogryllus Otte & Perez-Gelabert, 2009
- Itaropsis Chopard, 1925
- Jarawasia Koçak & Kemal, 2008
- Mayumbella Otte, 1987
- Meristoblemmus Jones & Chopard, 1936
- Nemobiodes Chopard, 1917
- Oediblemmus Saussure, 1898
- Oligachaeta Chopard, 1961
- Omogryllus Otte, 1987
- Platygryllus Chopard, 1961
- Parasciobia Chopard, 1935
- Qingryllus Chen & Zheng, 1995
- Rubrogryllus Vickery, 1997
- Songella Otte, 1987
- Stephoblemmus Saussure, 1877
- Stilbogryllus Gorochov, 1983
- Svercoides Gorochov, 1990
- Taciturna Otte, 1987
- Thiernogryllus Roy, 1969
- Zebragryllus Desutter-Grandcolas & Cadena-Castañeda, 2014
