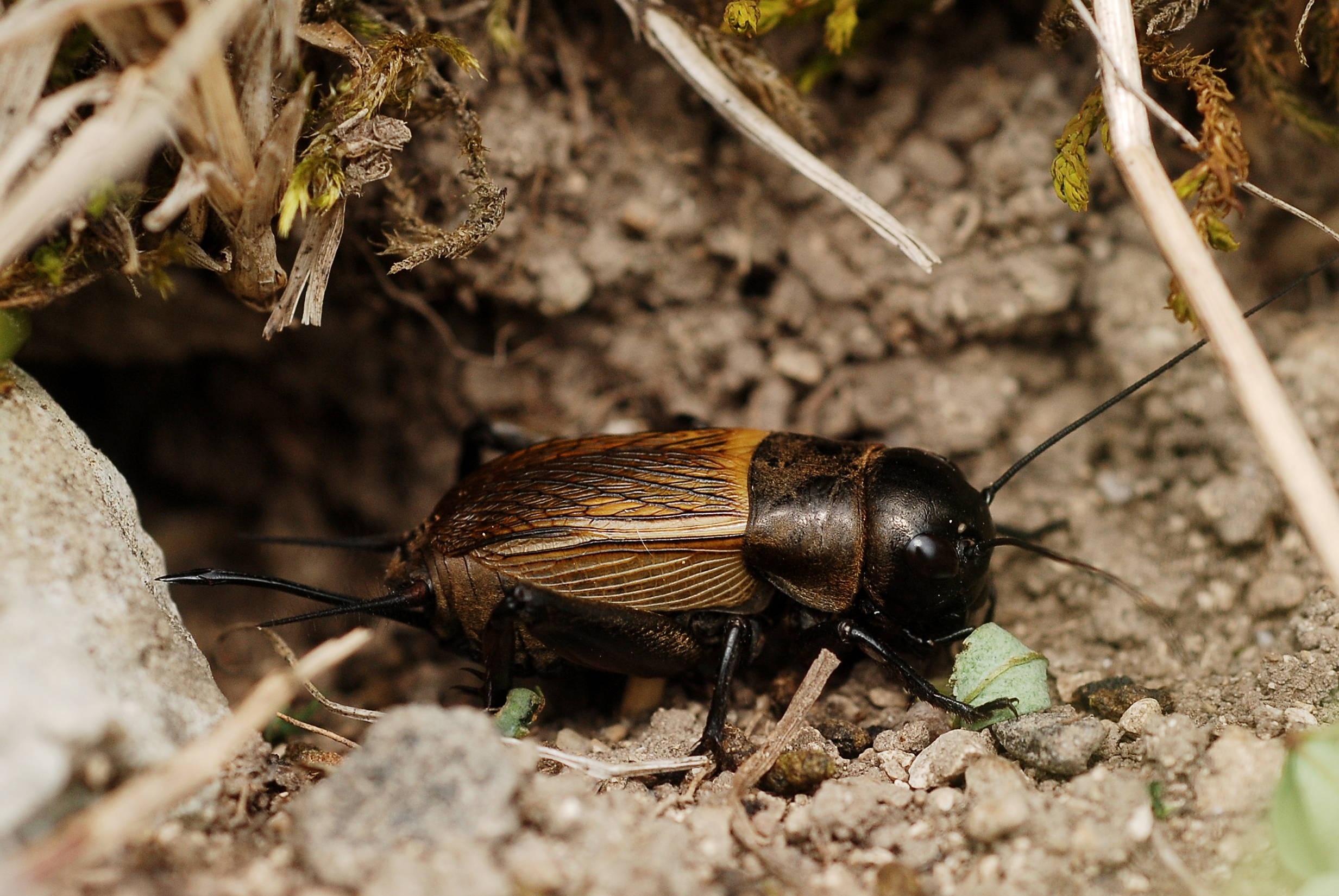
- Female Gryllus campestris

Scientific classification
- Domain: Eukaryota
- Kingdom: Animalia
- Phylum: Arthropoda
- Class: Insecta
- Order: Orthoptera
- Suborder: Ensifera
- Superfamily: Grylloidea
- Family: Gryllidae; Laicharting, 1781

Synonyms
- Gryllides Laicharting, 1781; Mitratogryllus Furukawa, 1985 (nomen nudum); Paragryllidae Desutter-Grandcolas, 1987

= Gryllidae =

Gryllidae Temporal range: Early Cretaceous–Recent

Family of crickets

The family Gryllidae contains the subfamilies and genera which entomologists now term true crickets. Having long, whip-like antennae, they belong to the Orthopteran suborder Ensifera, which has been greatly reduced in the last 100 years (e.g. Imms): taxa such as the tree crickets, spider-crickets and their allies, sword-tail crickets, wood or ground crickets and scaly crickets have been moved or elevated to family level. (Note: Many taxa in the Ensifera may be called crickets sensu lato, including the Rhaphidophoridae – cave or camel crickets; Stenopelmatidae – Jerusalem or sand crickets; Mogoplistidae – scaly crickets; Gryllotalpidae – mole crickets; Anabrus – Mormon crickets; Myrmecophilidae – ant crickets; and Tettigoniidae – the bush crickets or katydids.) The type genus is Gryllus and the first use of the family name "Gryllidae" was by Francis Walker.

They have a worldwide distribution (except Antarctica). The most familiar field crickets (Gryllinae) are characteristically robust brown or black insects; the largest members of the family are the 5 cm (2 in)-long bull crickets (Brachytrupes) which excavate burrows a metre or more deep.

== Subfamilies ==
The family is divided into these subfamily groups, subfamilies, and extinct genera (not placed within any subfamily):

- Subfamily group Gryllinae Laicharting, 1781 – common or field crickets
  - Gryllinae Laicharting, 1781 (now includes Sclerogryllini Gorochov, 1985)
  - Gryllomiminae Gorochov, 1986 monotypic: Gryllomimus Chopard, 1936 (Africa)
  - Gryllomorphinae Saussure, 1877
  - †Gryllospeculinae Gorochov, 1985
    - †Araripegryllus Martins-Neto 1987 Crato Formation, Brazil, Aptian ?Weald Clay, United Kingdom, Hauterivian
    - †Brontogryllus Martins-Neto 1991 Crato Formation, Brazil, Aptian
    - †Gryllospeculum Gorochov 1985 Dzun-Bain Formation, Mongolia, Aptian
    - †Mongolospeculum Gorochov 1985 Dzun-Bain Formation, Mongolia, Aptian
    - †Proararipegryllus Gorochov & Coram, 2022
  - Gryllinae incertae sedis
1. Capillogryllus Xie, Zheng & Liang, 2003
2. †Cratogryllus Martins-Neto, 1991 Crato Formation, Brazil, Aptian
3. Neogryllodes Otte, 1994
4. Rhabdotogryllus Chopard, 1954
5. †Sharovella Gorochov, 1985
6. Spinogryllus Vasanth, 1993
7. †Trichogryllus Chopard, 1936
  - Itarinae Shiraki, 1930
  - Landrevinae Gorochov, 1982
- Subfamily Eneopterinae Saussure, 1893 – bush crickets (American usage), not to be confused with the Tettigoniidae (katydids or bush crickets)
- Subfamily unplaced: most extinct
  - genus †Achetomorpha Gorochov, 2019 Bembridge Marls, United Kingdom, Priabonian
  - genus †Eneopterotrypus – monotypic Zeuner, 1937 Bembridge Marls, United Kingdom, Priabonian
  - genus †Fanzus – monotypic Zessin, 2019 Fur Formation, Denmark, Ypresian
  - genus †Gryllidium Westwood, 1854
  - genus †Lithogryllites Cockerell, 1908 Florissant Formation, United States, Eocene
  - genus Menonia – monotypic M. cochinensis George, 1936 (tentative placement)
  - genus †Nanaripegryllus – monotypic Martins-Neto, 2002 Crato Formation, Brazil, Aptian
  - genus †Pherodactylus – monotypic Poinar, Su & Brown, 2020, Burmese amber, Myanmar, Cenomanian
  - genus †Proeneopterotrypus Gorochov, 2019 – monotypic †P. danicus (Rust, 1999) Fur Formation, Denmark, Ypresian

== See also ==
- List of Orthopteroid genera containing species recorded in Europe
