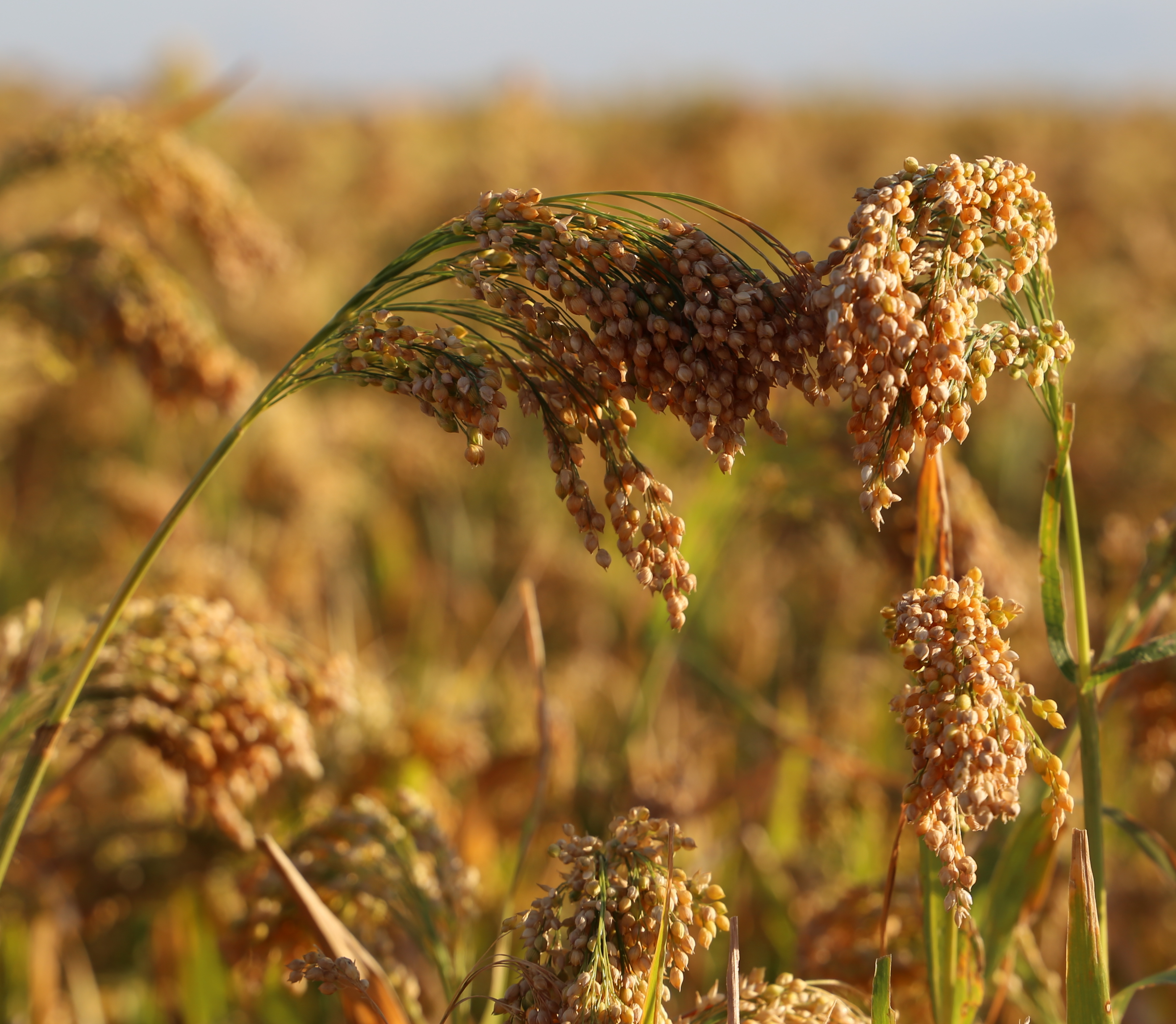
- Proso millet panicles

Scientific classification
- Kingdom: Plantae
- Clade: Embryophytes
- Clade: Tracheophytes
- Clade: Angiosperms
- Clade: Monocots
- Clade: Commelinids
- Order: Poales
- Family: Poaceae
- Subfamily: Panicoideae
- Genus: Panicum
- Species: P. miliaceum

Binomial name
- Panicum miliaceum L.

Synonyms
- Leptoloma miliacea (L.) Smyth; Milium esculentum Moench nom. illeg.; Milium panicum Mill. nom. illeg.; Panicum asperrimum Fisch.; Panicum asperrimum Fischer ex Jacq.; Panicum densepilosum Steud.; Panicum milium Pers. nom. illeg.; Panicum ruderale (Kitag.) D.M.Chang; Panicum spontaneum Zhuk. nom. inval.

= Proso millet =

Species of grass

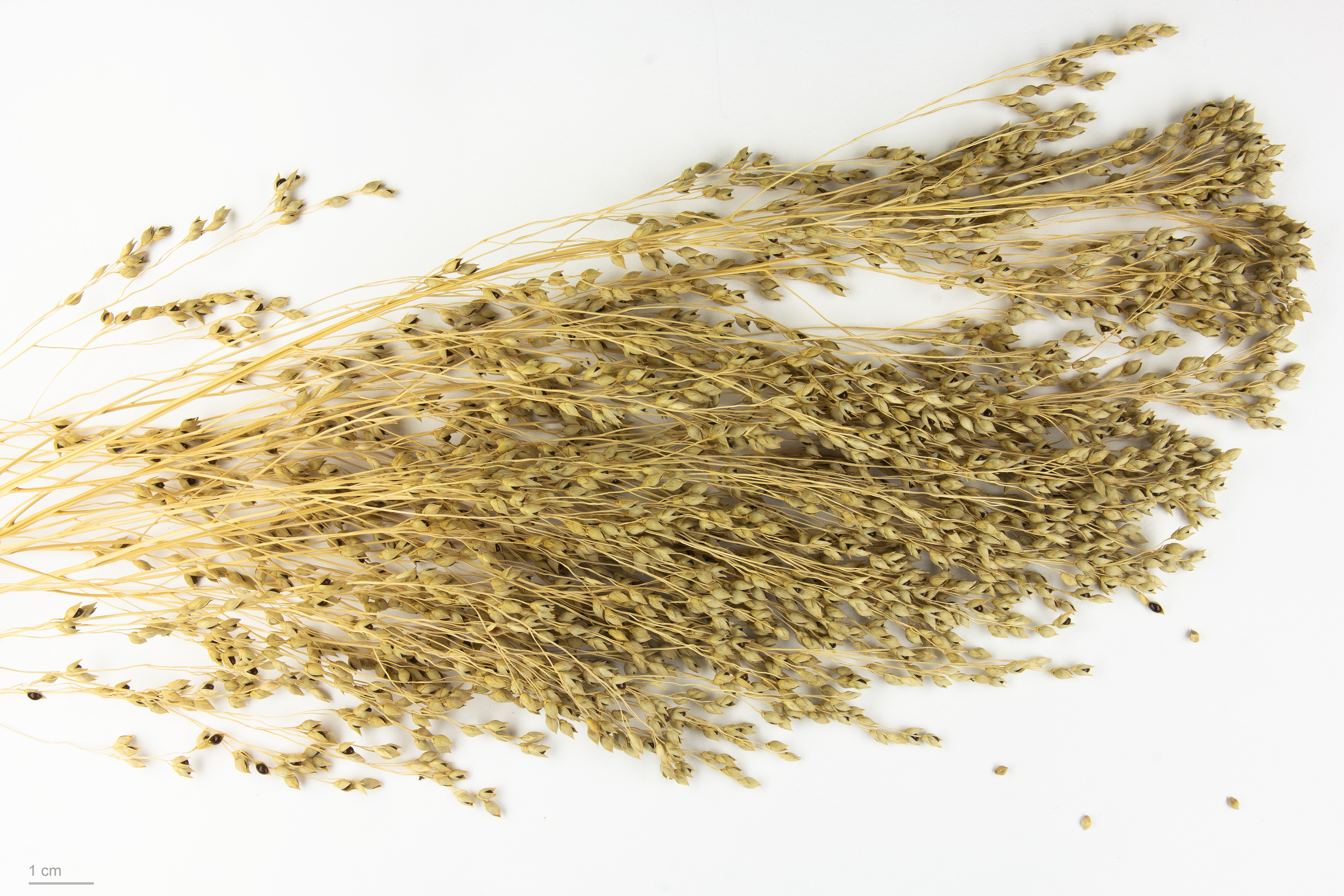
Panicum miliaceum (MHNT)

Panicum miliaceum is a grain crop with many common names, including proso millet, broomcorn millet, common millet, hog millet, Kashfi millet, red millet, and white millet. Archaeobotanical evidence suggests millet was first domesticated about 10,000 BP in Northern China. Major cultivated areas include Northern China, Himachal Pradesh of India, Nepal, Russia, Ukraine, Belarus, the Middle East, Turkey, Romania, and the Great Plains states of the United States. About 500,000 acres (200,000 hectares) are grown each year. The crop is notable both for its extremely short lifecycle, with some varieties producing grain only 60 days after planting, and its low water requirements, producing grain more efficiently per unit of moisture than any other grain species tested. The name "proso millet" comes from the pan-Slavic general and generic name for millet (Serbo-Croatian: proso/просо, Czech: proso, Polish: proso, Russian: просо).

Proso millet is a relative of foxtail millet, pearl millet, maize, and sorghum within the grass subfamily Panicoideae. While all of these crops use C4 photosynthesis, the others all employ the NADP-ME as their primary carbon shuttle pathway, while the primary C4 carbon shuttle in proso millet is the NAD-ME pathway.

== Evolutionary history ==
Panicum miliaceum is a tetraploid species with a base chromosome number of 18, twice the base chromosome number of diploid species within its genus Panicum. The species appears to be an allotetraploid resulting from a wide hybrid between two different diploid ancestors. One of the two subgenomes within proso millet appears to have come from either P. capillare or a close relative of that species. The second subgenome does not show close homology to any known diploid Panicum species, but some unknown diploid ancestor apparently also contributed a copy of its genome to a separate allotetraploid species P. repens (torpedo grass). The two subgenomes within proso millet are estimated to have diverged 5.6 million years ago. However, the species has experienced only limited amounts of fractionation and copies of most genes are still retained on both subgenomes. A sequenced version of the proso millet genome, estimated to be around 920 megabase pairs in size, was published in 2019.

== As a weed ==
Weedy and feral types are classified as Panicum ruderale(Kitag.) Chang comb. Nov. or Panicum miliaceum subsp. ruderale. A 2018 report developed a morphometric analysis method which distinguishes seeds of P. miliaceum and P. ruderale on the basis of micromorphology.

== Domestication and history of cultivation ==
Weedy forms of proso millet are found throughout central Asia, covering a widespread area from the Caspian Sea east to Xinjiang and Mongolia. These may represent the wild progenitor of proso millet or feral escapes from domesticated production. Indeed, in the United States, weedy proso millet, representing feral escapes from cultivation, are now common, suggesting current proso millet cultivars retain the potential to revert, similar to the pattern seen for weedy rice. Currently, the earliest archeological evidence for domesticated proso millet comes from the Cishan site in semiarid north east China around 8,000 BCE. Because early varieties of proso millet had such a short lifecycle, as little as 45 days from planting to harvest, they are thought to have made it possible for seminomadic tribes to first adopt agriculture, forming a bridge between hunter-gatherer-focused lifestyles and early agricultural civilizations. Archaeological charred grains of common millet were found in several Neolithic sites in Europe and Transcaucasia but radiocarbon dates obtained thanks to AMS method directly from the grains, indicated that it appeared in that area in the 2nd millennium BC. At around 1700 BCE, broomcorn millet was present north of the Black Sea, 1450 BCE in central Europe, and 1200 BCE in northern Europe.

=== Cultivation ===
Proso millet is a relatively low-demanding crop, and diseases are not known; consequently, it is often used in organic farming systems in Europe. In the United States, it is often used as an intercrop. Thus, proso millet can help to avoid a summer fallow, and continuous crop rotation can be achieved. Its superficial root system and its resistance to atrazine residue make proso millet a good intercrop between two water- and pesticide-demanding crops. The stubbles of the last crop, by allowing more heat into the soil, result in a faster and earlier millet growth. While millet occupies the ground, because of its superficial root system, the soil can replenish its water content for the next crop. Later crops, for example, a winter wheat, can in turn benefit from the millet stubble, which act as snow accumulators. P. miliaceum is commonly classified into five races, miliaceum, patentissimum, contractum, compactum, and ovatum.

=== Climate and soil requirements ===
Due to its C4 photosynthetic system, proso millet is thermophilic like maize, so shady locations of the field should be avoided. It is sensitive to temperatures lower than 10 to 13 °C (50 to 55 °F). Proso millet is highly drought-resistant, which makes it of interest to regions with low water availability and longer periods without rain. The soil should be light or medium-heavy. Due to its flat root systems, soil compaction must be avoided. Furthermore, proso millet does not tolerate soil wetness caused by dammed-up water.

A 2019 study found different cultivars have significantly different effects on rhizosphere assemblage, and also that Proteobacteria, Bacteroidetes, Chloroflexi, Gemmatimonadetes, Firmicutes, Verrucomicrobia, and Planctomycetes are the most common members, in declining order.

=== Seedbed and sowing ===
The seedbed should be finely crumbled as for sugar beet and rapeseed. In Europe, proso millet is sowed between mid-April and the end of May. About 500 grams per acre (44 oz/ha) of seeds are required, which is roughly 500 per square metre (2,000,000/acre). In organic farming, this amount should be increased if a harrow weeder is used. For sowing, the usual sowing machines can be used similarly to how they are used for other crops such as wheat. A distance between the rows of 16 to 25 centimetres (6.3 to 9.8 in) is recommended if the farmer uses an interrow cultivator. The sowing depth should be 1.5 to 2 centimetres (0.59 to 0.79 in) in optimal soil or 3 to 4 centimetres (1.2 to 1.6 in) in dry soil. Rolling of the ground after sowing is helpful for further cultivation. Cultivation in no-till farming systems is also possible and often practiced in the United States. Sowing then can be done two weeks later.

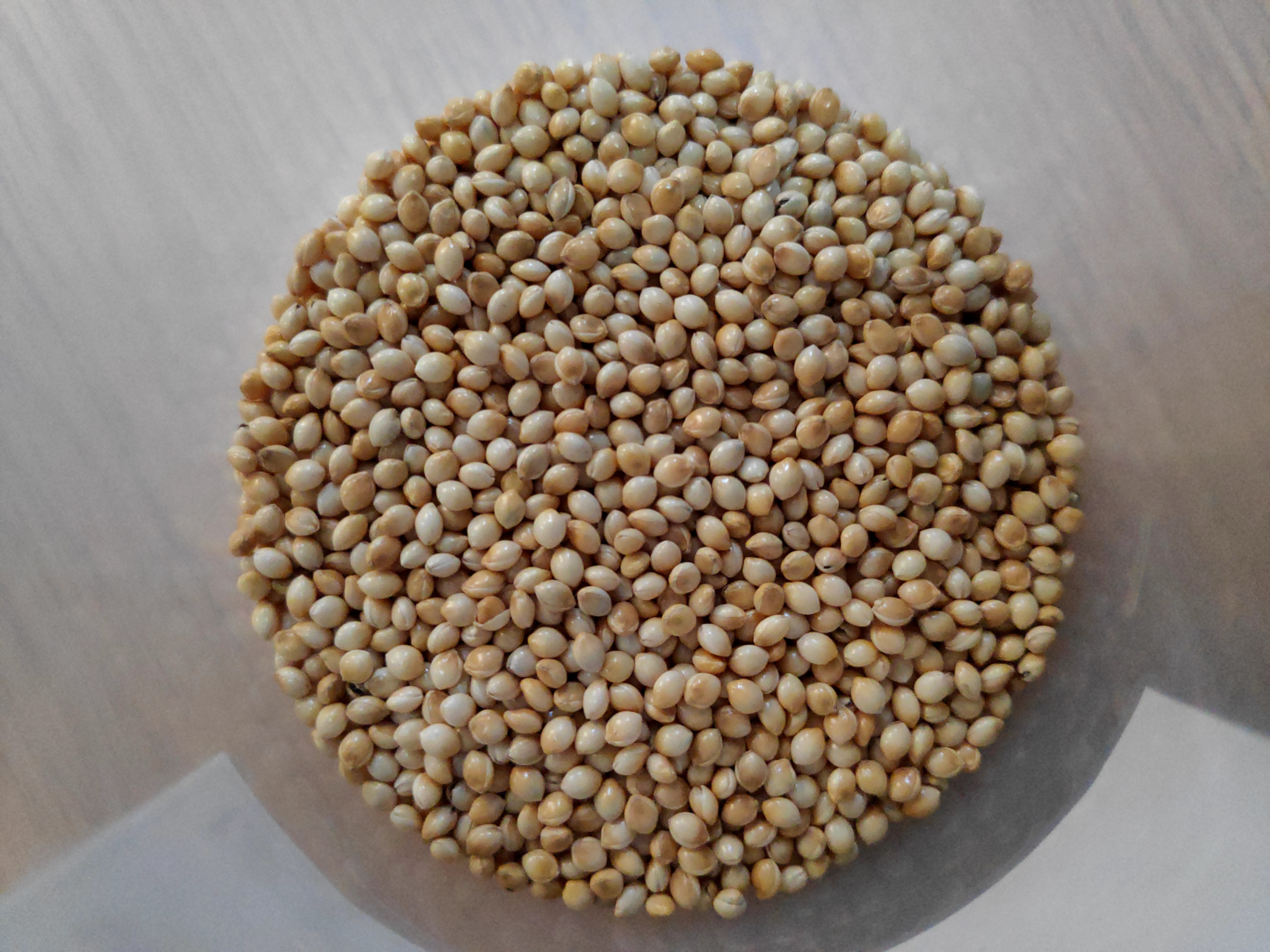

=== Field management ===
Only a few diseases and pests are known to attack proso millet, but they are not economically important. Weeds are a bigger problem. The critical phase is in juvenile development. The formation of the grains happens in the 3- to 5-leaf stage. After that, all nutrients should be available for the millet, so preventing the growth of weeds is necessary. In conventional farming, herbicides may be used. In organic farming, harrow weeder or interrow cultivator use is possible, but special sowing parameters are needed. For good crop development, fertilization with 50 to 75 kilograms (110 to 165 lb) nitrogen per hectare is recommended. Planting proso millet in a crop rotation after maize should be avoided due to its same weed spectrum. Because proso millet is an undemanding crop, it may be used at the end of the rotation.

=== Pests ===
Insect pests include:

Seedling pests

- shoot fly Atherigona pulla (proso millet shoot fly, a major pest in India and Africa)
- Atherigona miliaceae, Atherigona soccata, and A. punctata
- wheat stem maggot Meromyza americana occurs in the United States
- thrip, Haplothrips aculeatus
- armyworms Mythimna separata, M. unipuncta, Spodoptera exempta, and S. frugiperda
- field cricket Brachytrupes sp.

Stem borers

- Chilo partellus, Ch. suppressalis, Chilo orichalcociliellus, Sesamia inferens, S. cretica, and Ostrinia furnacalis

Leaf feeders

- leaf folders Cnaphalocrocis medinalis and Cn. patnalis
- hairy caterpillar Spilosoma obliqua
- rice butterfly Melanitis leda ismene
- Moroccan locust Dociostaurus maroccanus
- migratory locust Locusta migratoria
- grasshoppers Hieroglyphus banian and Oxya chinensis

Earhead feeders

- cotton boll worm Helicoverpa zea (in the United States)

Other pests

- aphid Sipha flava (in North America)
- earhead bug Leptocorisa acuta and green bug Nezara viridula suck the milky developing grains in India
- termites, Odontotermes spp. and Microtermes spp., are the common species recorded on proso millet during dry seasons in India.

=== Harvesting and postharvest treatments ===
Harvest time is at the end of August until mid-September. Determining the best harvest date is not easy because all the grains do not ripen simultaneously. The grains on the top of the panicle ripen first, while the grains in the lower parts need more time, making compromise and harvest necessary to optimize yield. Harvesting can be done with a conventional combine harvester with the moisture content of the grains around 15-20%. Usually, proso millet is mowed into windrows first, since the plants are not dry like wheat. There, they can wither, which makes the threshing easier. Then the harvest is done with a pickup attached to a combine. Possible yields are between 2.5 and 4.5 tonnes per hectare (1.00 and 1.79 long ton/acre; 1.1 and 2.0 short ton/acre) under optimal conditions. Studies in Germany showed that even higher yields can be attained.

=== Geographical distribution ===
In the United States, as of 2015, the total cultivated area of proso millet was 204,366 hectares (505,000 acres), mostly in the Great Plains states. The top three producers in 2015 were Colorado, Nebraska, and South Dakota, with 109,265 hectares (270,000 acres), 42,492 hectares (105,000 acres), and 28,328 hectares (70,000 acres). Historically grown as animal and bird seed, as of 2020, it has found a market as an organic gluten-free grain.

Proso millet is one of the few types of millet not cultivated in Africa.

== Uses ==
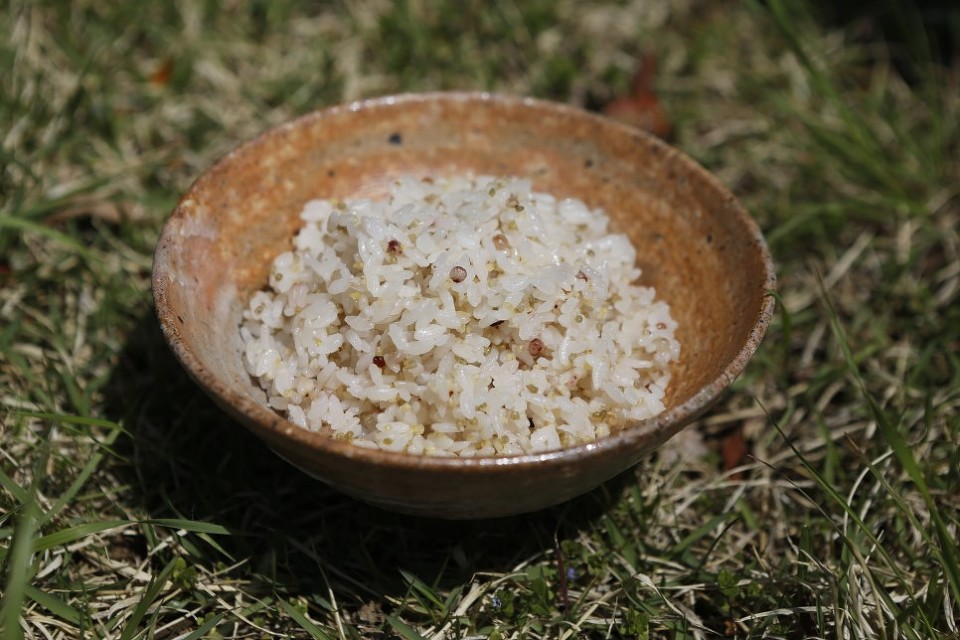
Cooked rice with proso millet

=== Nutrition ===
Millet flour
Nutritional value per 100 g (3.5 oz)
- Energy: 1,597 kJ (382 kcal)
- Carbohydrates: 75.1 g
- Dietary fiber: 3.5 g
- Fat: 4.2 g
- Protein: 10.8 g
Vitamins and minerals
| Vitamins | Quantity %DV^{†} |
| Thiamine (B1) | 33% 0.4 mg |
| Riboflavin (B2) | 5% 0.07 mg |
| Niacin (B3) | 38% 6 mg |
| Pantothenic acid (B5) | 26% 1.3 mg |
| Vitamin B6 | 22% 0.37 mg |
| Folate (B9) | 11% 42 μg |
| Vitamin E | 1% 0.11 mg |
| Vitamin K | 1% 0.8 μg |
| Minerals | Quantity %DV^{†} |
| Calcium | 1% 14 mg |
| Iron | 22% 3.9 mg |
| Magnesium | 28% 119 mg |
| Manganese | 43% 1 mg |
| Phosphorus | 23% 285 mg |
| Potassium | 7% 224 mg |
| Sodium | 0% 4 mg |
| Zinc | 24% 2.6 mg |
- Other constituents: Quantity
- Water: 8.7 g
- Full Report of USDA Database entry
- ^{†}Percentages estimated using US recommendations for adults, except for potassium, which is estimated based on expert recommendation from the National Academies.

Millet flour is 9% water, 75% carbohydrates, 11% protein, and 4% fat. In a reference amount of 100 grams (3.5 oz), millet flour supplies 382 calories, and is a rich source (20% or more of the Daily Value, DV) of several B vitamins and dietary minerals.

The demand for more diverse and healthier cereal-based foods is increasing, particularly in affluent countries. Protein content in proso millet grains is comparable with that of wheat, but the proportion of certain essential amino acids (leucine, isoleucine, and methionine) is substantially higher in proso millet. Among the most commonly consumed products are ready-to-eat breakfast cereals made purely from millet flour, and a variety of noodles and bakery products that are produced from mixtures of wheat and millet flours to improve their sensory quality.

=== Culinary ===
In Inner Mongolia and northwestern Shanxi, China, fermented proso millet porridge known as "suan zhou" (酸粥) is popular. Millet is soaked to allow fermentation, then water is emptied to obtain porridge. The emptied water is served as a millet drink called "suan mi tang" (酸米湯). The porridge is eaten alongside pickles, e.g. turnips, carrots, radish and celery. The porridge may be stir-fried and is called "chao suan zhou" (炒酸粥). The porridge may also be steamed into a firmer form known as "suan lao fan" (酸撈飯). While the traditional grain is proso millet, it is mixed with rice when available. Many folk idioms of sourness derive from this dish.

In the United States, proso millet is used to brew gluten-free beer, being mixed with other grains for texture.

=== Livestock and poultry ===
Proso millet is primarily grown as livestock and poultry fodder. As food it is very deficient in lysine and needs complementation. Proso millet is also a poor fodder due to its low leaf-to-stem ratio and a possible irritant effect due to its hairy stem. Foxtail millet, having a higher leaf-to-stem ratio and less hairy stems, is preferred as fodder, particularly the variety called moha, which is a high-quality fodder.

=== Fermentation products ===
Starch derived from millet has been shown to be a good substrate for fermentation and malting with grains having similar starch contents as wheat grains. One study suggested that starch derived from proso millet can be converted to ethanol with an only moderately lower efficiency than starch derived from corn. As proso millet is compatible with low-input agriculture, cultivation on marginal soils for biofuel production may present a new market for farmers.

== Local names ==
Native names for proso millet in its cultivated area include:

- Jin Chinese: 糜米
- Bengali: cheena
- Odia: china bachari bagmu
- Kannada: baragu
- Telugu: variga
- Hindi: chena or barri
- Punjabi: cheena
- Gujarati: cheno
- Marathi: varaī
- Tamil: pani varagu
- Nepali: dudhe
- Kazakh: тары
- Catalan: Mill Comú
