= Leptacris maxima =

Scientific classification
- Kingdom: Animalia
- Phylum: Arthropoda
- Clade: Pancrustacea
- Class: Insecta
- Order: Orthoptera
- Suborder: Caelifera
- Family: Acrididae
- Subfamily: Hemiacridinae
- Tribe: Leptacrini
- Genus: Leptacris
- Species: L. maxima

Binomial name
- Leptacris maxima (Karny, 1907)

Species of grasshopper

Leptacris maxima is a species of grasshopper in the family Acrididae and tribe Leptacrini. The scientific name of this species was first published in 1907 by Karny.
