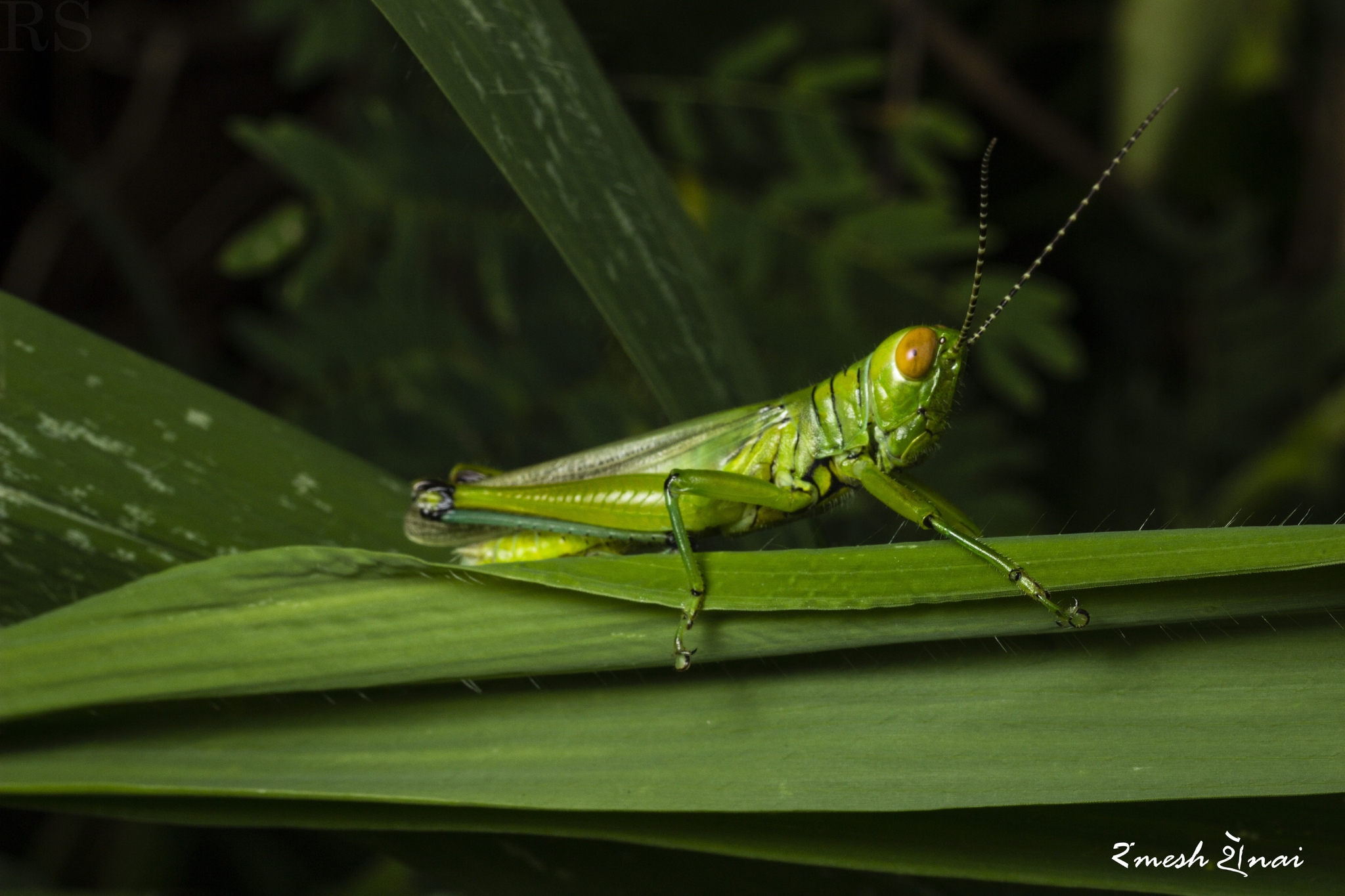
- Hieroglyphus annulicornis, India

Scientific classification
- Kingdom: Animalia
- Phylum: Arthropoda
- Clade: Pancrustacea
- Class: Insecta
- Order: Orthoptera
- Suborder: Caelifera
- Family: Acrididae
- Subfamily: Hemiacridinae
- Tribe: Hieroglyphini
- Genus: Hieroglyphus
- Species: H. annulicornis

Binomial name
- Hieroglyphus annulicornis (Shiraki, 1910)

= Hieroglyphus annulicornis =

Species of short-horned grasshopper

Hieroglyphus annulicornis is a species of short-horned grasshopper in the family Acrididae. It is found in India and southeastern Asia.
