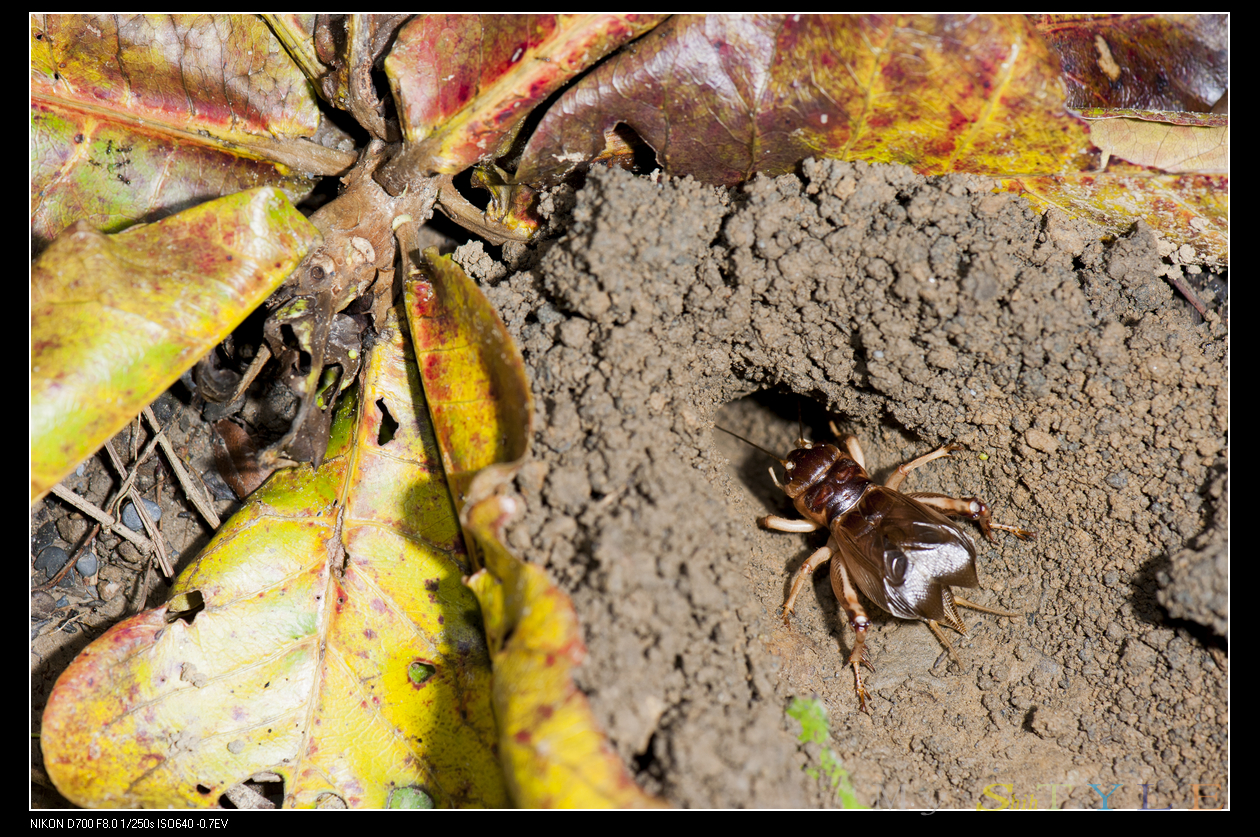
- Tarbinskiellus portentosus male singing at burrow

Scientific classification
- Kingdom: Animalia
- Phylum: Arthropoda
- Class: Insecta
- Order: Orthoptera
- Suborder: Ensifera
- Family: Gryllidae
- Subfamily: Gryllinae
- Tribe: Gryllini
- Genus: Tarbinskiellus; Gorochov, 1983

= Tarbinskiellus =

Genus of crickets

Tarbinskiellus is a genus of crickets in the family Gryllidae and tribe Gryllini. Species can be found in Asia.

== Species ==
Tarbinskiellus includes the following species:

- Tarbinskiellus neotropicus Gorochov, 2001
- Tarbinskiellus orientalis Fabricius, 1775
- Tarbinskiellus portentosus Lichtenstein, 1796 - type species
- Tarbinskiellus sororius Wang, Zhang & Liu, 2020
- Tarbinskiellus terrificus Walker, 1869
