= Hieroglyphus nigrorepletus =

Scientific classification
- Kingdom: Animalia
- Phylum: Arthropoda
- Clade: Pancrustacea
- Class: Insecta
- Order: Orthoptera
- Suborder: Caelifera
- Family: Acrididae
- Genus: Hieroglyphus
- Species: H. nigrorepletus

Binomial name
- Hieroglyphus nigrorepletus Bolívar, 1912

Species of grasshopper

Hieroglyphus nigrorepletus is a species of grasshopper in the family Acrididae. It is a highly serious pest of millets such as sorghum and pearl millet in western India.
