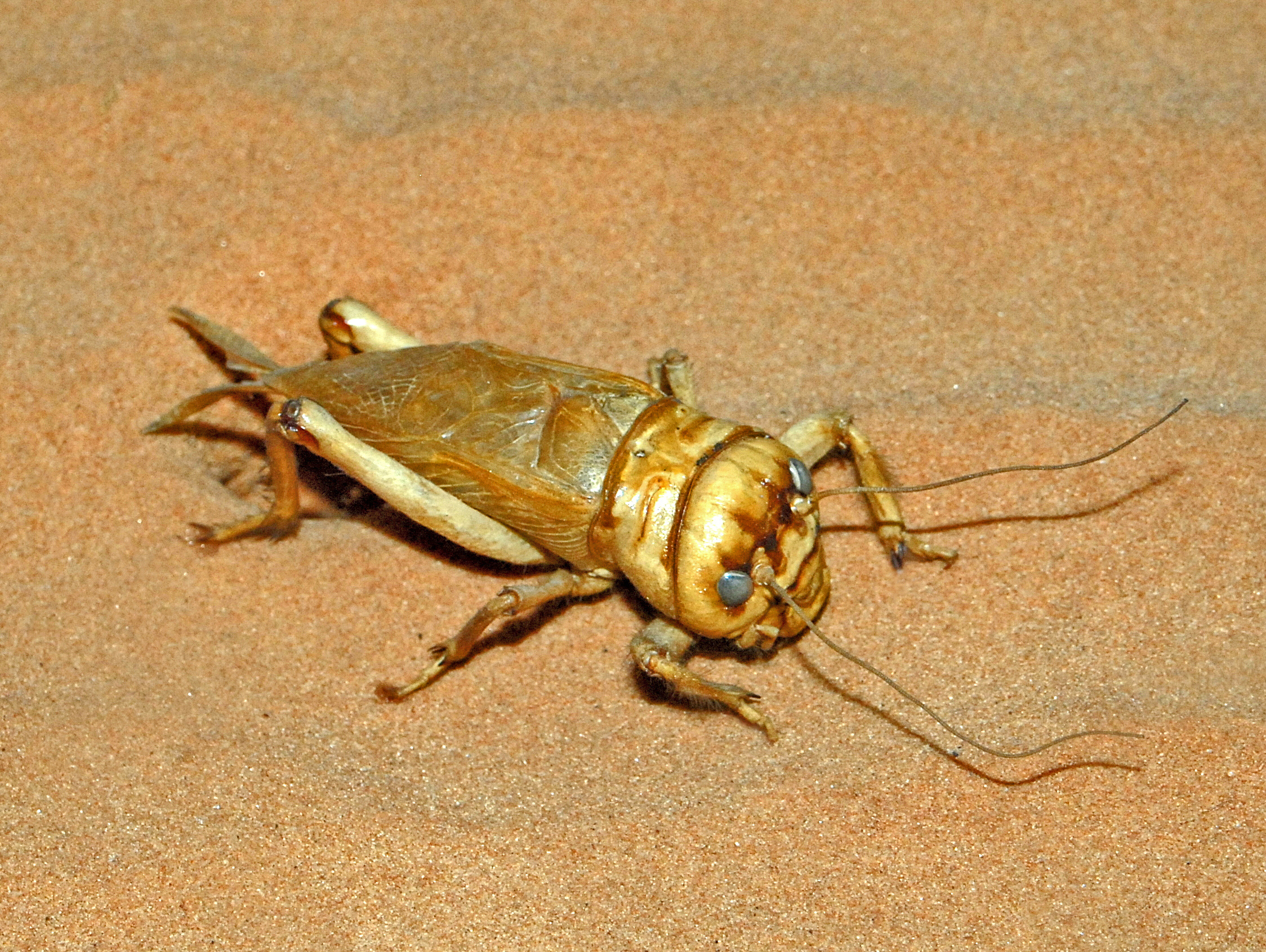

Scientific classification
- Kingdom: Animalia
- Phylum: Arthropoda
- Clade: Pancrustacea
- Class: Insecta
- Order: Orthoptera
- Suborder: Ensifera
- Family: Gryllidae
- Genus: Brachytrupes
- Species: B. megacephalus

Binomial name
- Brachytrupes megacephalus (Lefèbvre, 1827)

Synonyms
- Gryllus megacephalus Lefèbvre, 1827; Brachytrypes megacephalus (Lefebvre, 1827)

= Brachytrupes megacephalus =

Species of cricket

Brachytrupes megacephalus is a species of cricket in the family Gryllidae. The species is native to the Mediterranean region.

== Description and behavior ==
Brachytrupes megacephalus can reach a length of about 40 mm (1.6 in). This species is characterized by a very large head (hence the specific name megacephalus) and strong jaws. The tibia of the front and rear legs are armed with big "teeth" which facilitate the action of digging the deep holes in sandy soils in which this cricket lives. This insect has crepuscular and nocturnal habits. The mating period extends from mid-March to the end of April. After mating, the males keep the females captive in their holes until they lay their eggs.

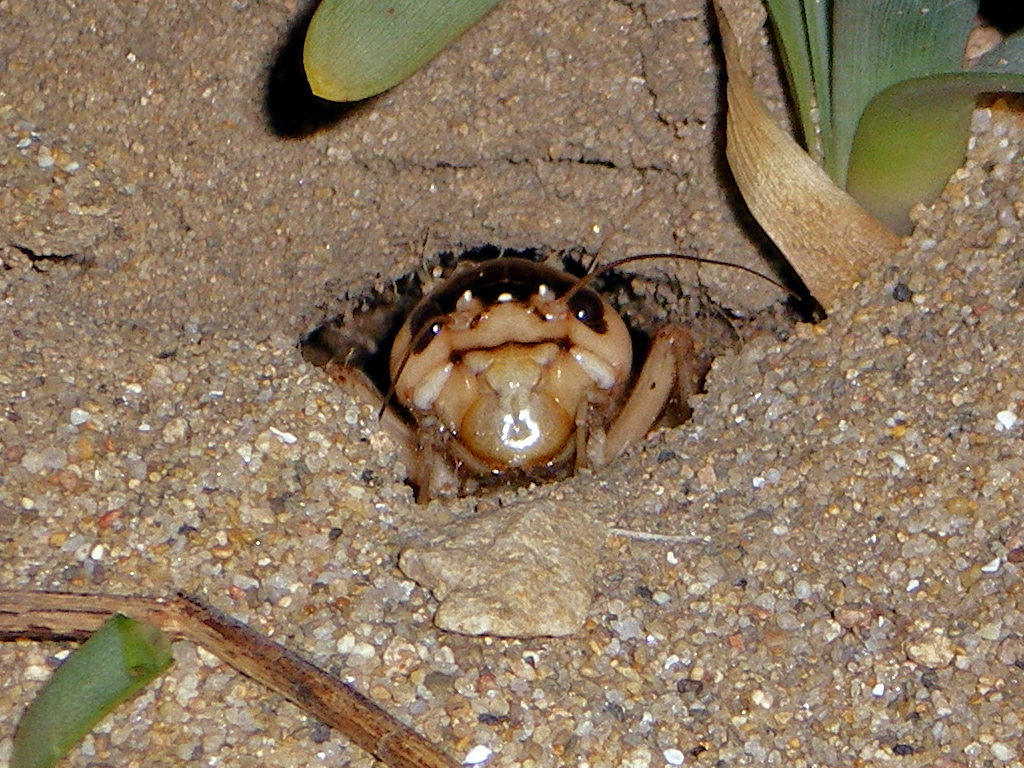
Brachytrupes megacephalus (Lefèbvre, 1827) photographed on 24 Apr 2018 at Capo Pecora (Sardinia)

== Distribution and habitat ==
The species Brachytrupes megacephalus can be found in sandy environments in Sardinia, Sicily, Malta and North Africa.

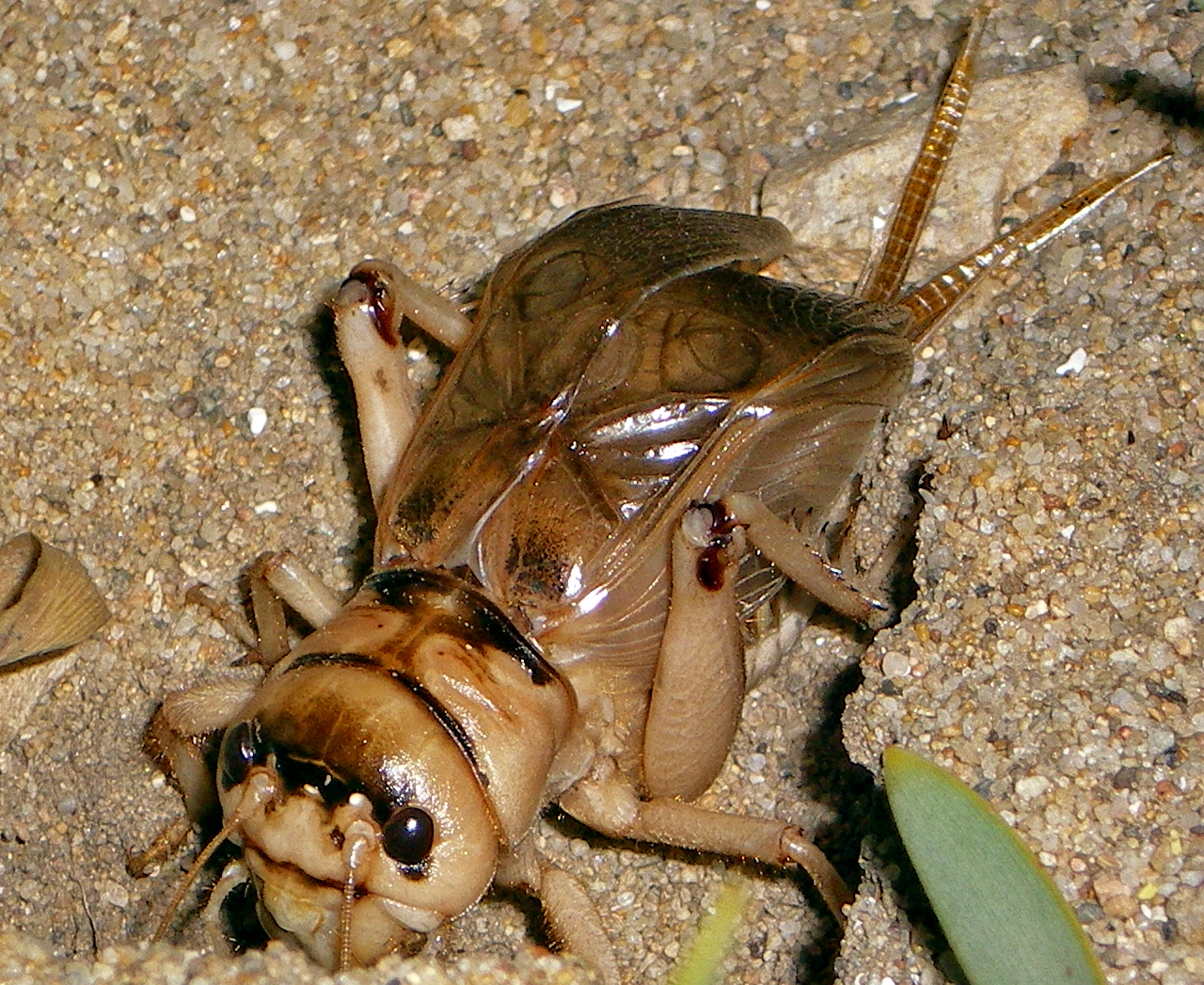
Brachytrupes megacephalus photographed at Capo Pecora (Sardinia)

== Bibliography ==
- Saussure, H. (1877). Mem. Soc. Phys. Hist. Nat. Geneve 25 (1): 285 [117].
- Kirby, W.F. (1906). A Synonymic Catalogue of Orthoptera (Orthoptera Saltatoria, Locustidae vel Acridiidae) 2: 23.
- Giglio-Tos, E. (1907). Boll. Musei Zool. Anat. Comp. R. Univ. Torino 22 (563): 23.
- Lefèbvre, A. (1827). Ann. Soc. Linn. Paris 6: 10.
- Serville, J. (1839). Histoire naturelle des insectes. Orthoptères 326.
- Randell, R.L. (1964). Canadian Ent. 96: 1587. >> Brachytrupes megacephalus
- Massa, B. (2009). Jour. Orth. Res. 18 (1): 78. >> Brachytrupes megacephalus
- Cassar, L.-F. (2009). Bulletin of the Entomological Society of Malta 2 :126. >> Brachytrupes megacephalus
- Sahnoun, Doumandji & Desutter-Grandcolas. (2010). Zootaxa 2432:8 >> Brachytrupes megacephalus
- Brizio, C. (2018). Biodiversity Journal 9 (2): 135–142. >> "Bioacoustic evidence of two uncommon crickets from SW Sardinia, including an analysis of the song of B. megacephalus in the ultrasonic range".
