= Acanthoxia =

Scientific classification
- Kingdom: Animalia
- Phylum: Arthropoda
- Class: Insecta
- Order: Orthoptera
- Suborder: Caelifera
- Family: Acrididae
- Subfamily: Hemiacridinae
- Tribe: Leptacrini
- Genus: Acanthoxia; Bolívar, 1906

Synonyms
- Conyacanthella Giglio-Tos, 1907; Gonyacantha Stål, 1873; Gonyacanthella Giglio-Tos, 1907; Metapa Stål, 1878; Pretoriana Uvarov, 1922

Genus of grasshoppers

Acanthoxia is a genus of African grasshoppers in the tribe Leptacrini.

== Nomenclature ==
Pretoriana Curran, 1938 may be a junior homonym of a tachinid fly genus; a moth genus invalidly named thus by Traugott-Olsen in 1995 is now considered a junior synonym of Perittia.

== Species ==
1. Acanthoxia aculeus Grunshaw, 1996
2. Acanthoxia brevipenne Grunshaw, 1996
3. Acanthoxia gladiator (Westwood, 1841) - type species (as Opsomala gladiator Westwood, 1841)
4. Acanthoxia lanceolata (Bolívar, 1890)
5. Acanthoxia natalensis (Krauss, 1877) (synonym Ischnacrida pretoriae Miller, 1932)
