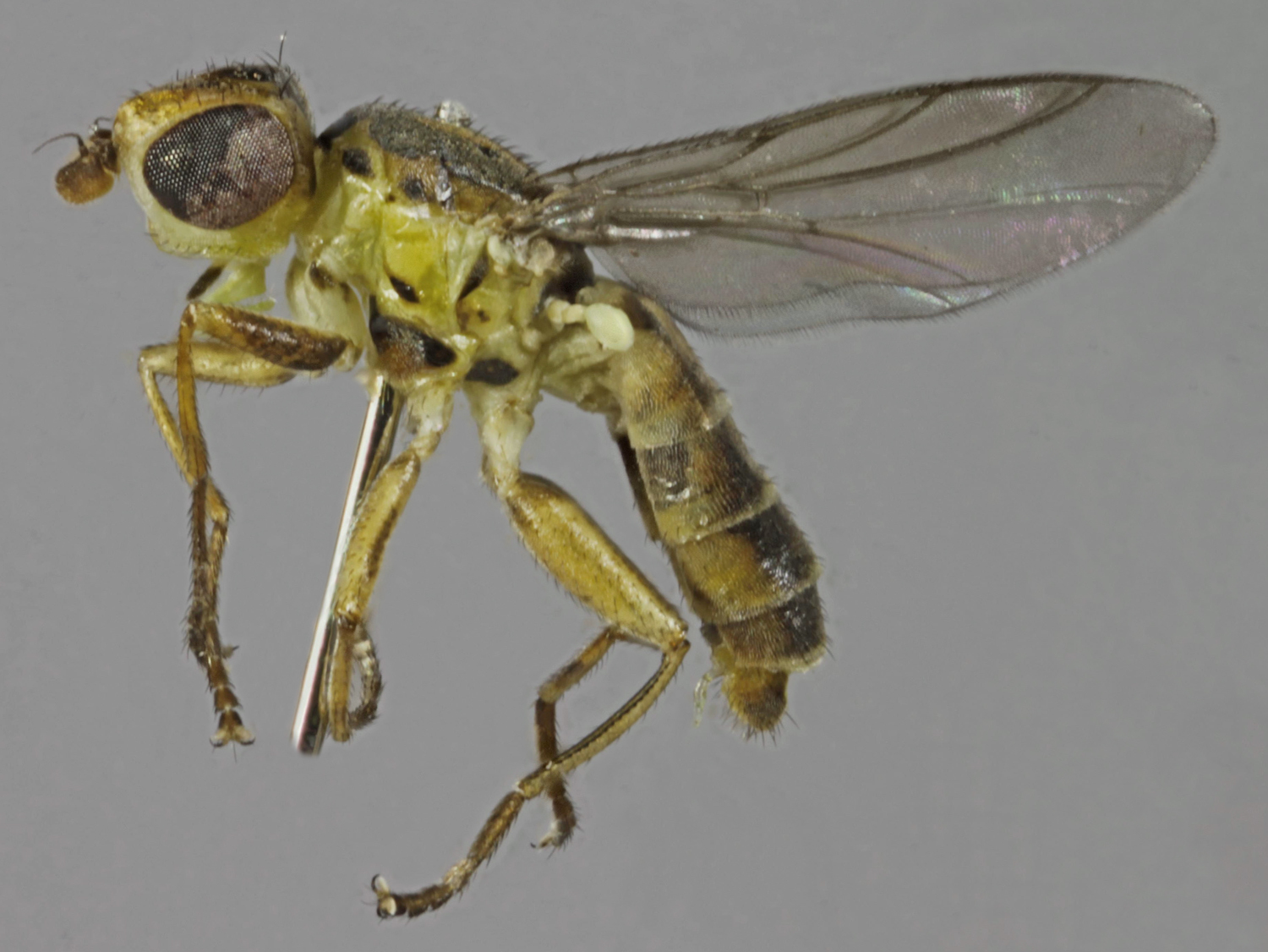
- Meromyza triangulina North Wales

Scientific classification
- Kingdom: Animalia
- Phylum: Arthropoda
- Clade: Pancrustacea
- Class: Insecta
- Order: Diptera
- Family: Chloropidae
- Genus: Meromyza
- Species: M. triangulina

Binomial name
- Meromyza triangulina Fedoseeva, 1960

= Meromyza triangulina =

Species of fly

Meromyza triangulina is a species of fly in the family Chloropidae that is found in the Palearctic. The larvae feed on Festuca ovina and Festuca rubra. M. triangulina usually emerge in the summer and overwinter as larvae. They are usually found in grasslands, meadows, and dunes, where their host grasses grow. They are stemborers, which means that the larvae live inside of the stem of their host grass, which can cause the top of the grass to wither, a condition that is usually referred as "silver top."
