= Meruana =

Scientific classification
- Kingdom: Animalia
- Phylum: Arthropoda
- Class: Insecta
- Order: Orthoptera
- Suborder: Caelifera
- Family: Acrididae
- Subfamily: Hemiacridinae
- Tribe: Leptacrini
- Genus: Meruana; Sjöstedt, 1910

Genus of grasshoppers

Meruana is a genus of African grasshoppers in the family Acrididae, subfamily Hemiacridinae from eastern Africa.

== Species ==
As of 2021, the Catalogue of Life and Orthoptera Species File list:

- Meruana sakuensis (Kevan, 1966)
- Meruana usambarica (Karsch, 1896) - type species (as Meruana nyuki Sjöstedt)
