= Phalaca =

Scientific classification
- Kingdom: Animalia
- Phylum: Arthropoda
- Class: Insecta
- Order: Orthoptera
- Suborder: Caelifera
- Family: Acrididae
- Subfamily: Hemiacridinae
- Tribe: Cranaeini
- Genus: Phalaca; Bolívar, 1906

Synonyms
- Phalaga [sic] Bolívar, 1906; Phemonoe Stål, 1878 (homonym)

Genus of grasshoppers

External image
- Images at iNaturalist

Phalaca is a genus of Asian grasshoppers in the tribe Cranaeini, erected by Ignacio Bolívar in 1906. Species have been recorded from India, Sri Lanka, Indochina to New Guinea, mostly from Malesia.

== Species ==
The Orthoptera Species File includes:

1. Phalaca antica (Walker, 1870)
2. Phalaca atrata Willemse, 1938
3. Phalaca borneensis Ramme, 1941
4. Phalaca coleoptrata (Bolívar, 1898)
5. Phalaca grylloides (Walker, 1870) - type species (as Phemonoe rufovittatus Stål, 1878 = P. grylloides rufovittata (Stål, 1878))
6. Phalaca ikonnikovi Ramme, 1941
7. Phalaca malaccensis Willemse, 1938
8. Phalaca nobilis Ramme, 1941
9. Phalaca obiensis Bolívar, 1923
10. Phalaca sarawakensis Willemse, 1938
11. Phalaca siargaoensis Willemse, 1938
12. Phalaca siebersia Willemse, 1938
13. Phalaca splendida Willemse, 1955
14. Phalaca viridis Willemse, 1938
15. Phalaca waterstradti Ramme, 1941
16. Phalaca yersini (Saussure, 1859)
