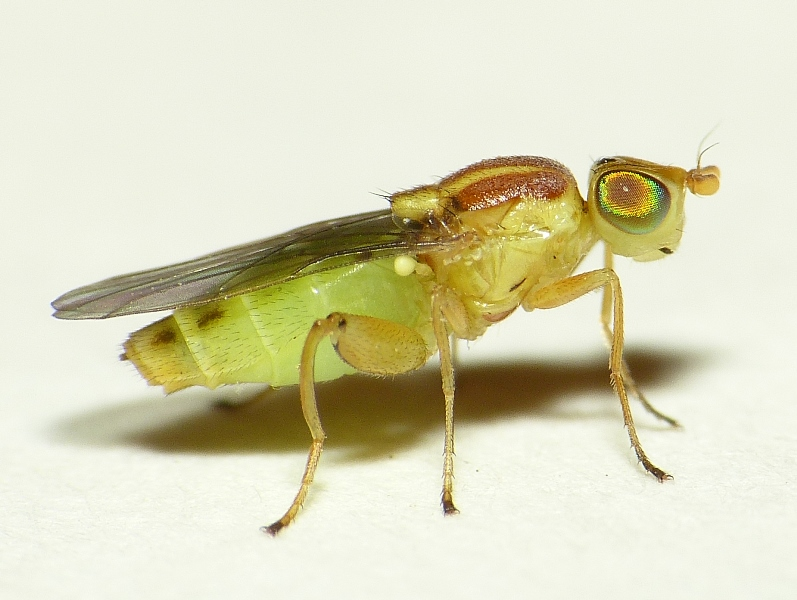
- Meromyza femorata Netherlands

Scientific classification
- Kingdom: Animalia
- Phylum: Arthropoda
- Class: Insecta
- Order: Diptera
- Family: Chloropidae
- Genus: Meromyza
- Species: M. femorata

Binomial name
- Meromyza femorata Macquart, 1835

Synonyms
- M. laeta Meigen, 1838

= Meromyza femorata =

Species of fly

Meromyza femorata is a species of fly in the family Chloropidae. It is found in the Palearctic.
