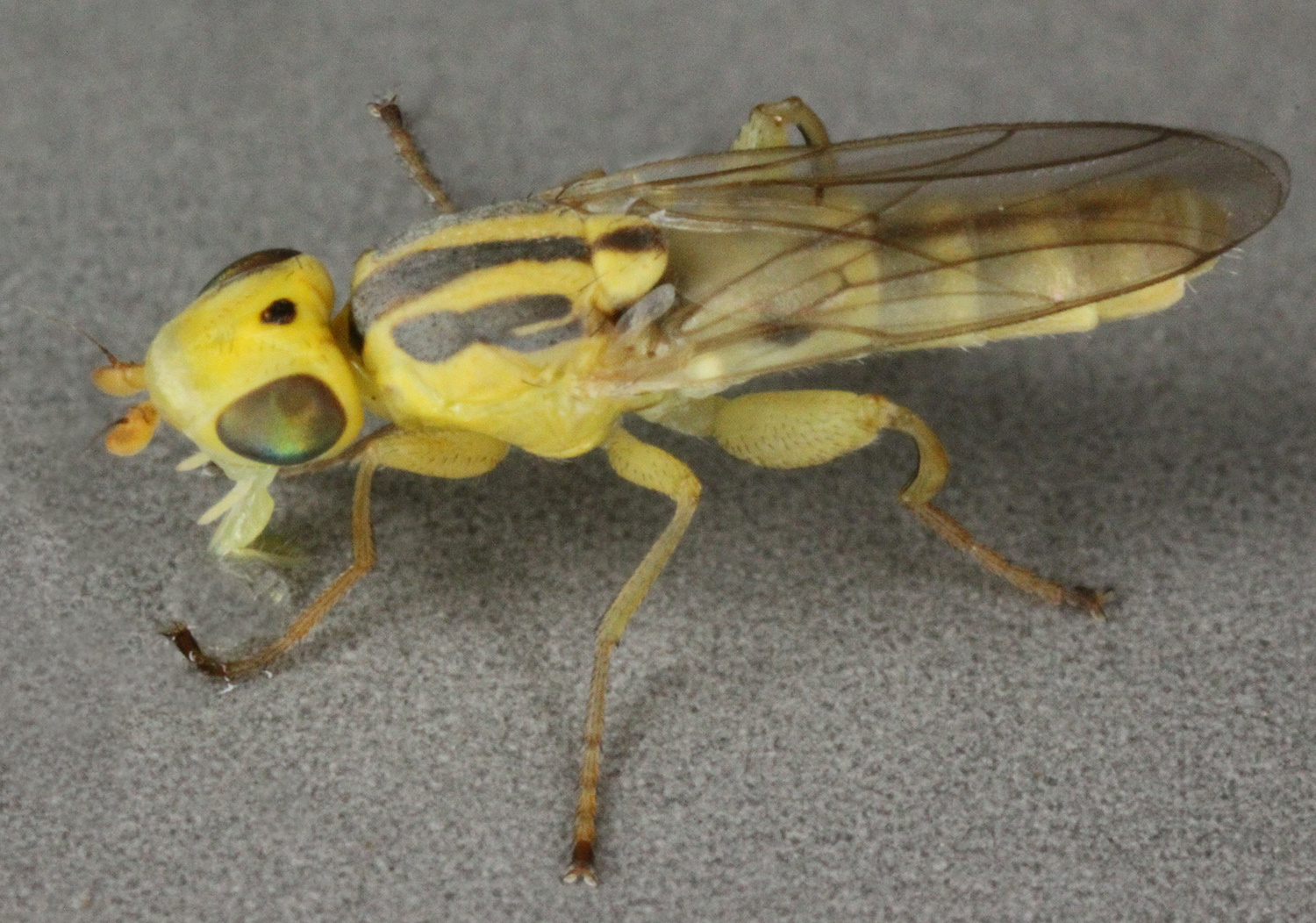
- Meromyza pratorum in North Wales

Scientific classification
- Kingdom: Animalia
- Phylum: Arthropoda
- Clade: Pancrustacea
- Class: Insecta
- Order: Diptera
- Family: Chloropidae
- Genus: Meromyza
- Species: M. pratorum

Binomial name
- Meromyza pratorum Meigen, 1830

Synonyms
- Meromyza viridula Haliday, 1833

= Meromyza pratorum =

Species of fly

Meromyza pratorum is a species of fly in the family Chloropidae, the grass flies. It is found in the Palearctic. The larva feeds on Poaceae such as Calamagrostis epigeios and probably other species of the genus Calamagrostis, and Leymus arenarius.
