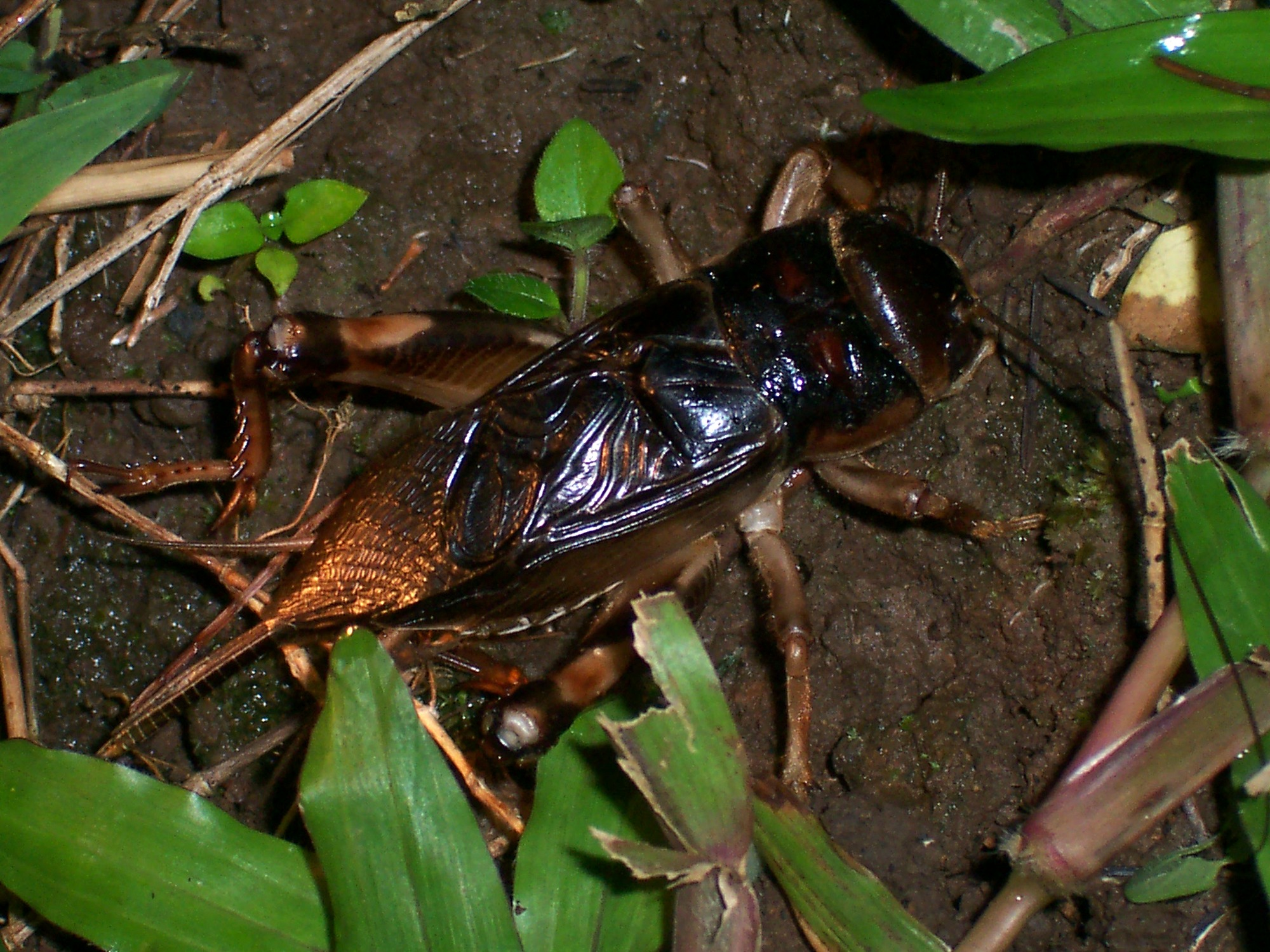
- T. portentosus taken in Bogor, Indonesia

Scientific classification
- Kingdom: Animalia
- Phylum: Arthropoda
- Class: Insecta
- Order: Orthoptera
- Suborder: Ensifera
- Family: Gryllidae
- Subfamily: Gryllinae
- Tribe: Gryllini
- Genus: Tarbinskiellus
- Species: T. portentosus

Binomial name
- Tarbinskiellus portentosus (Lichtenstein, 1796)

Synonyms
- Acheta portentosa Lichtenstein, 1796; Brachytrypes portentosus (Lichtenstein, 1796); Brachytrupes portentosus (Lichtenstein, 1796); Gryllus (Acheta) achatinus Stoll, 1813; Gryllus (Acheta) fuliginosa Stoll, 1813; Brachytrupes ustulatus Serville, 1838; Liogryllus formosanus Matsumura, 1910

= Tarbinskiellus portentosus =

Species of cricket

Tarbinskiellus portentosus is the type species of cricket in its Asian genus, which belongs to the tribe Gryllini. This species has been recorded from India, China, Indochina and Malesia; it is called Gangsir in Indonesia. Placed in the subtribe Brachytrupina, for many years this cricket was included in the African genus Brachytrupes, due to the relative size and shape of its head.

== Gallery ==
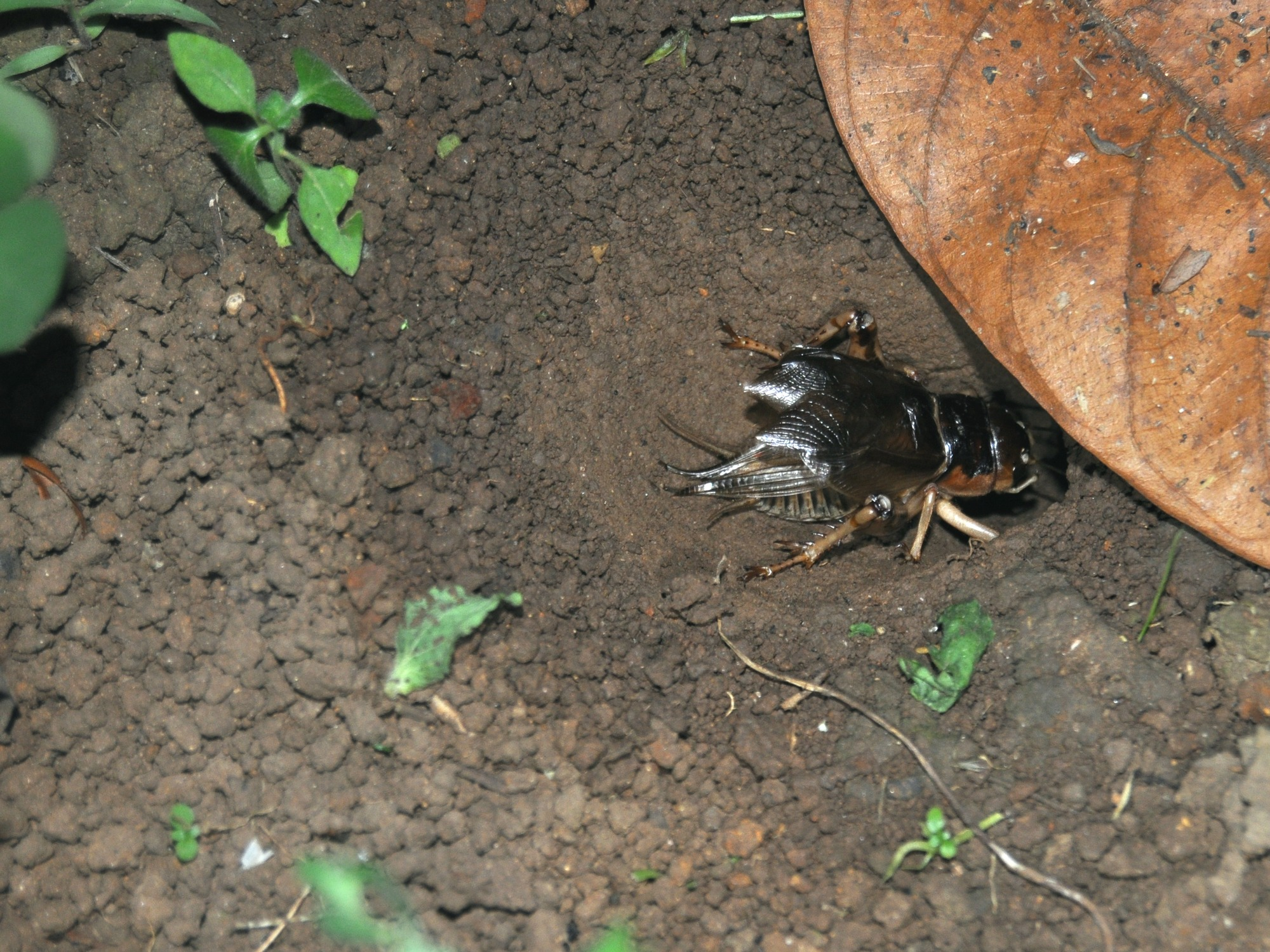
male, singing

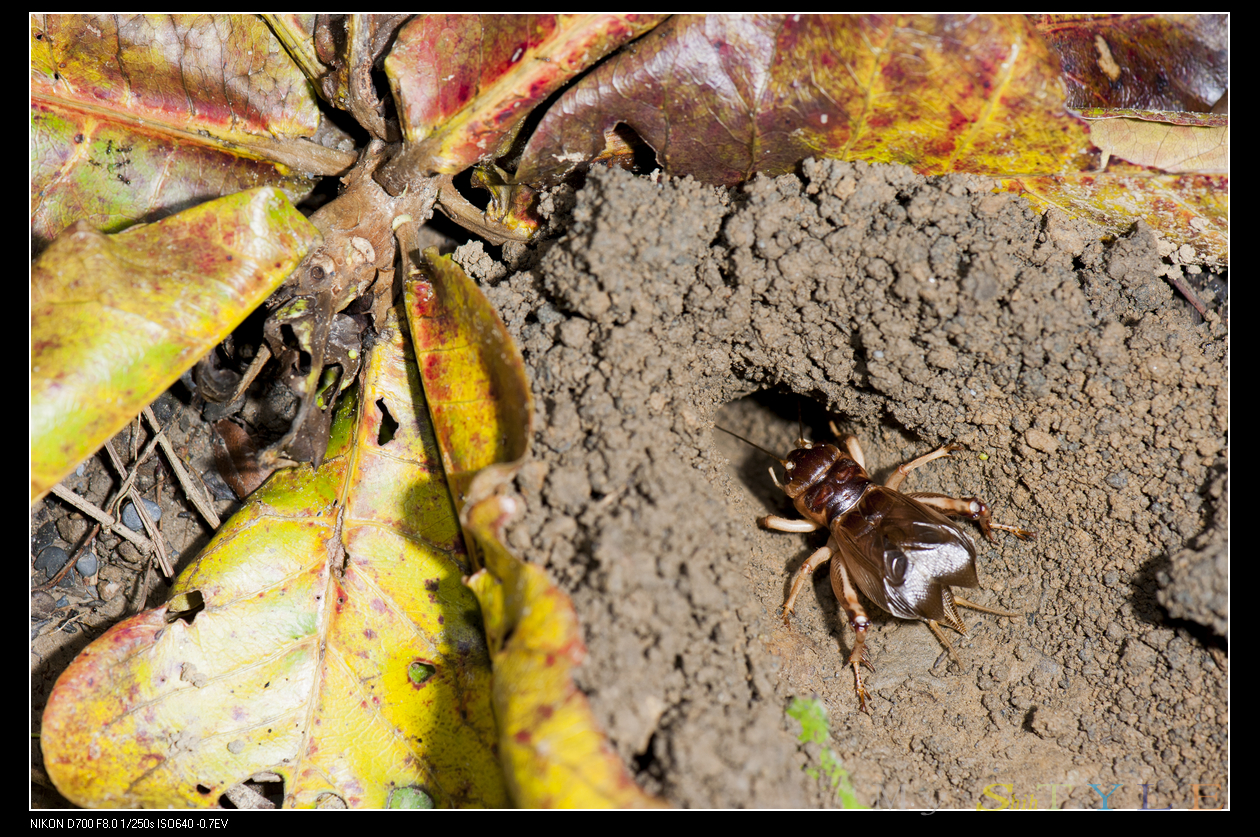

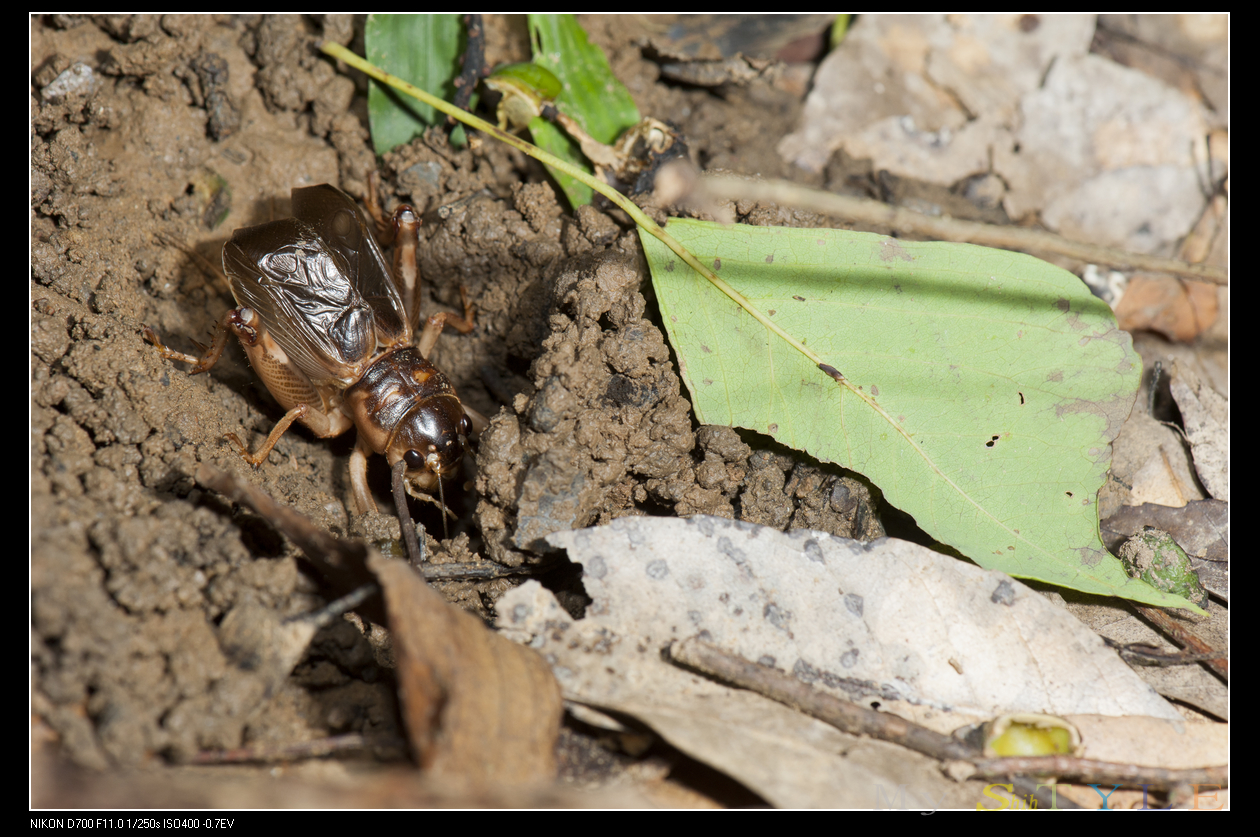

song

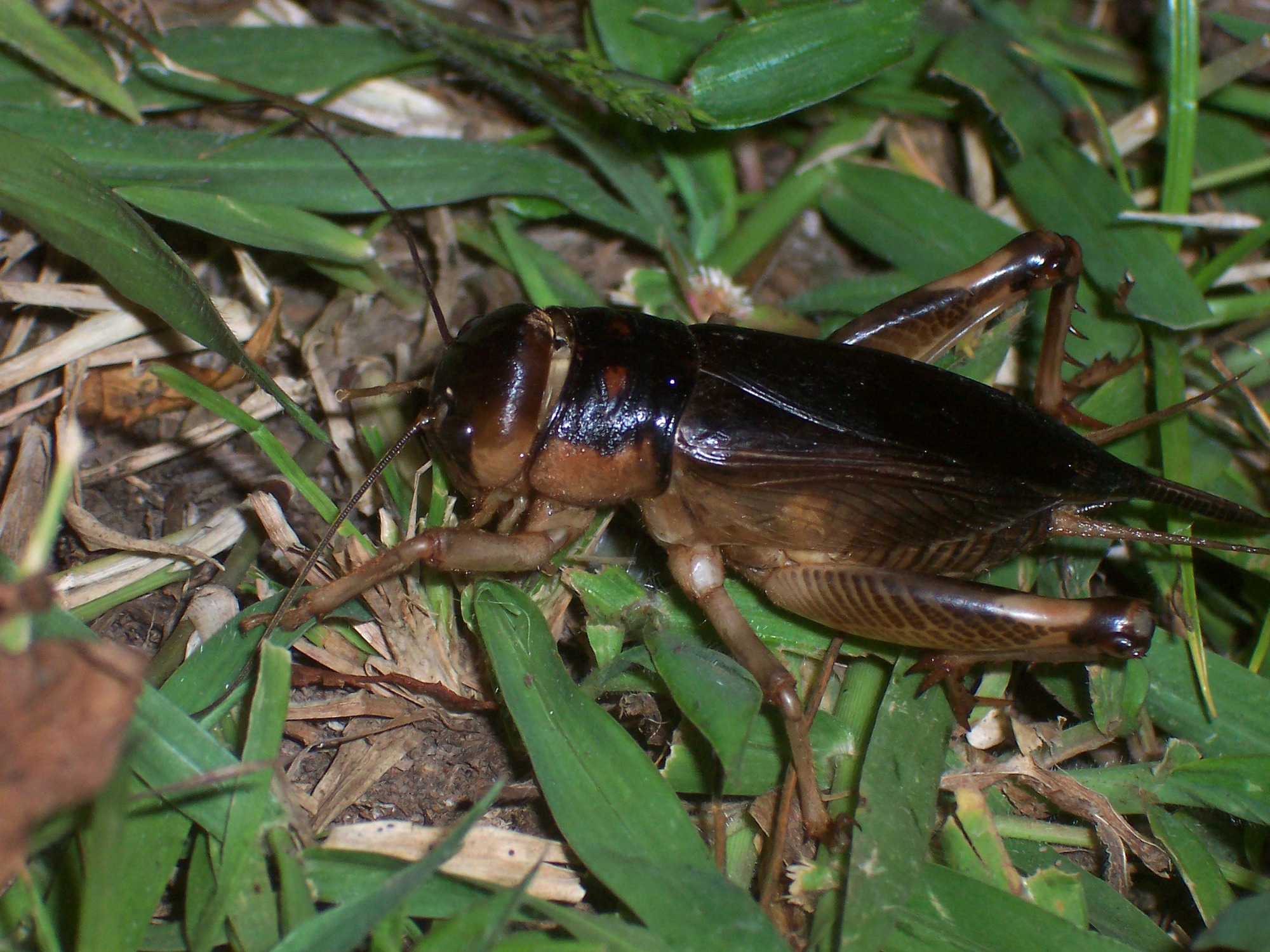
female

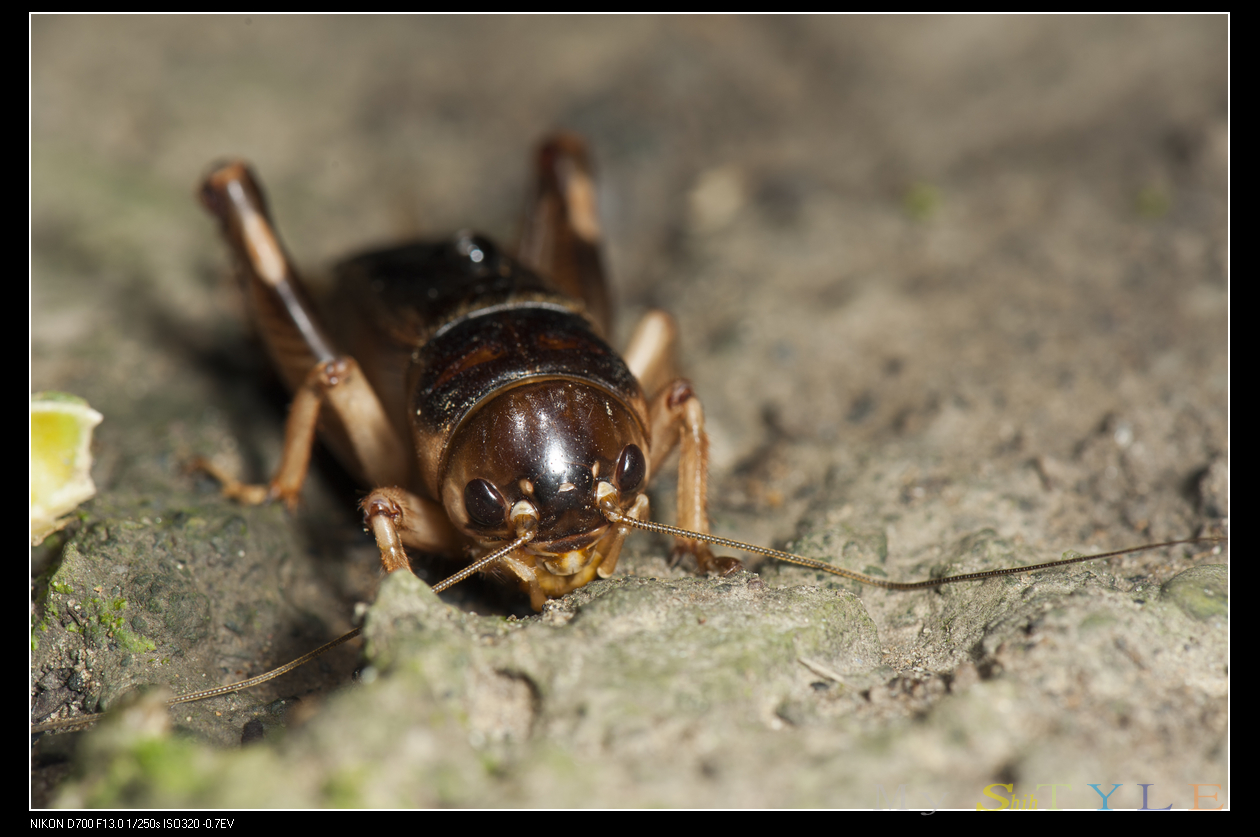
head
