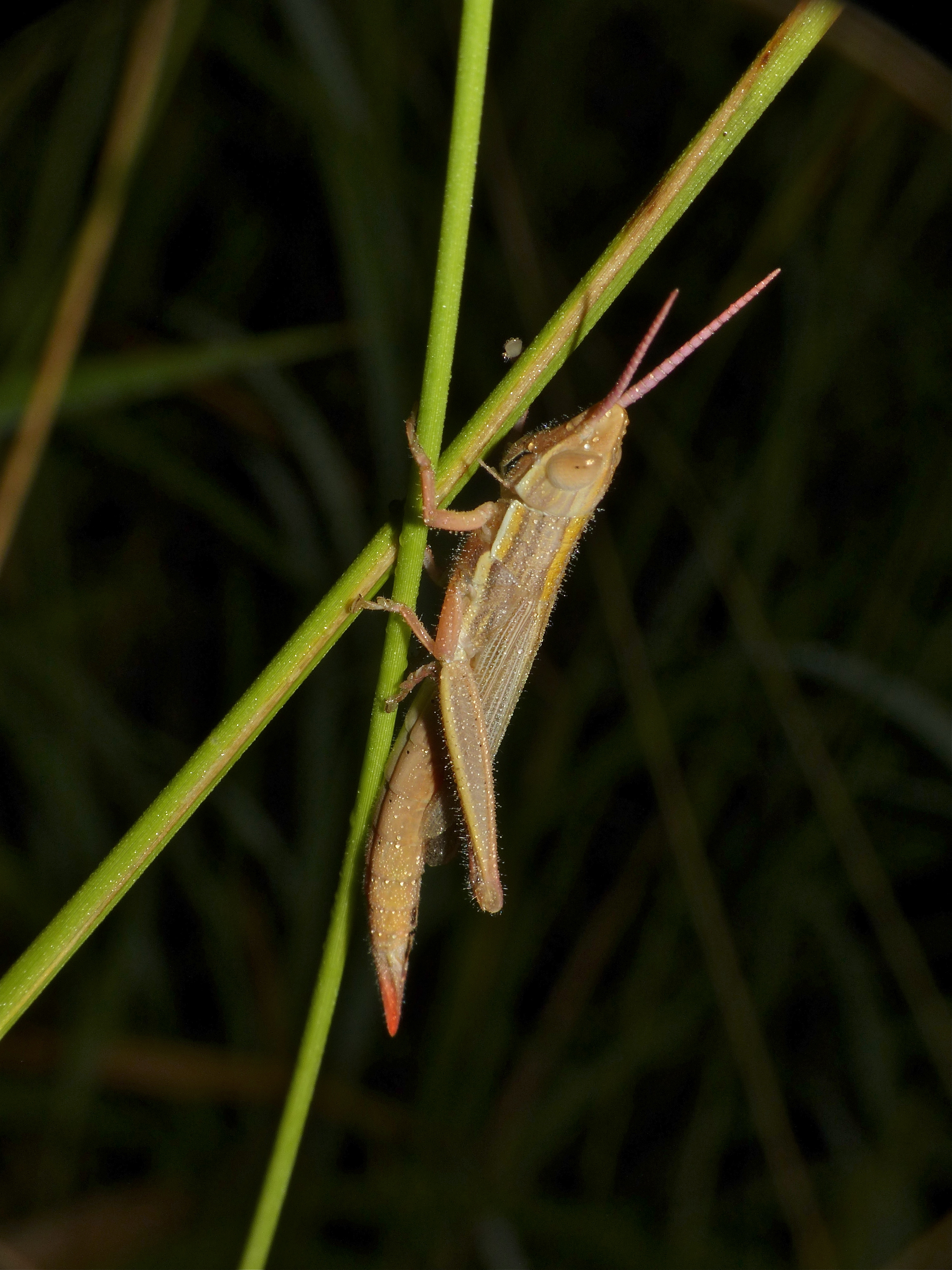
- Leptacris sp., Africa

Scientific classification
- Kingdom: Animalia
- Phylum: Arthropoda
- Class: Insecta
- Order: Orthoptera
- Suborder: Caelifera
- Family: Acrididae
- Tribe: Leptacrini
- Genus: Leptacris; Walker, 1870

Synonyms
- Capellea Bolívar, 1902; Ischinacrida Stål, 1873; Ischnacrida Stål, 1873; Ramphacrida Karsch, 1893; Rhamphacrida Karsch, 1893

= Leptacris =

Genus of grasshoppers

Leptacris is a genus of grasshoppers in the family Acrididae, subfamily Hemiacridinae; species have been recorded from Africa and tropical Asia.

== Species ==
The Catalogue of Life lists:

- Leptacris filiformis Walker, 1870 - type species (locality India, Maharashtra)
- Leptacris javanica Willemse, 1955
- Leptacris kraussi Bolívar, 1890
- Leptacris liyang Tsai, 1929
- Leptacris maxima Karny, 1907
- Leptacris monteiroi Bolívar, 1890
- Leptacris taeniata Stål, 1873
