= Hieroglyphus tonkinensis =

Scientific classification
- Kingdom: Animalia
- Phylum: Arthropoda
- Clade: Pancrustacea
- Class: Insecta
- Order: Orthoptera
- Suborder: Caelifera
- Family: Acrididae
- Genus: Hieroglyphus
- Species: H. tonkinensis

Binomial name
- Hieroglyphus tonkinensis Bolivar, 1912

Species of grasshopper

Hieroglyphus tonkinensis is a species of grasshopper found in Asia.

== Description ==
H. tonkinensis is a slender, medium-sized grasshopper with a finely pitted integument. Their general coloration is green or yellowish green with yellowish brown patches. The narrow grooves on the pronotum are black. The wings are glassy with veins both dark and pale brown. The hind knees feature black patches on both sides, while the tibia are blue with black bases.

== Range ==
H. tonkinensis has been found in Vietnam, Thailand, and China.

== Ecology ==
H. tonkinensis is known as a pest of rice, sugar cane, and bamboo.
