= Xenippa =

Scientific classification
- Kingdom: Animalia
- Phylum: Arthropoda
- Clade: Pancrustacea
- Class: Insecta
- Order: Orthoptera
- Suborder: Caelifera
- Family: Acrididae
- Subfamily: Hemiacridinae
- Tribe: Mesopserini
- Genus: Xenippa; Stål, 1878

Genus of insects

Xenippa is a genus of African grasshoppers in the subfamily Hemiacridinae (tribe Mesopserini).

== Species ==
The Orthoptera Species File includes:

1. Xenippa elegans Kevan, 1966
2. Xenippa viridula Stål, 1878 - type species
