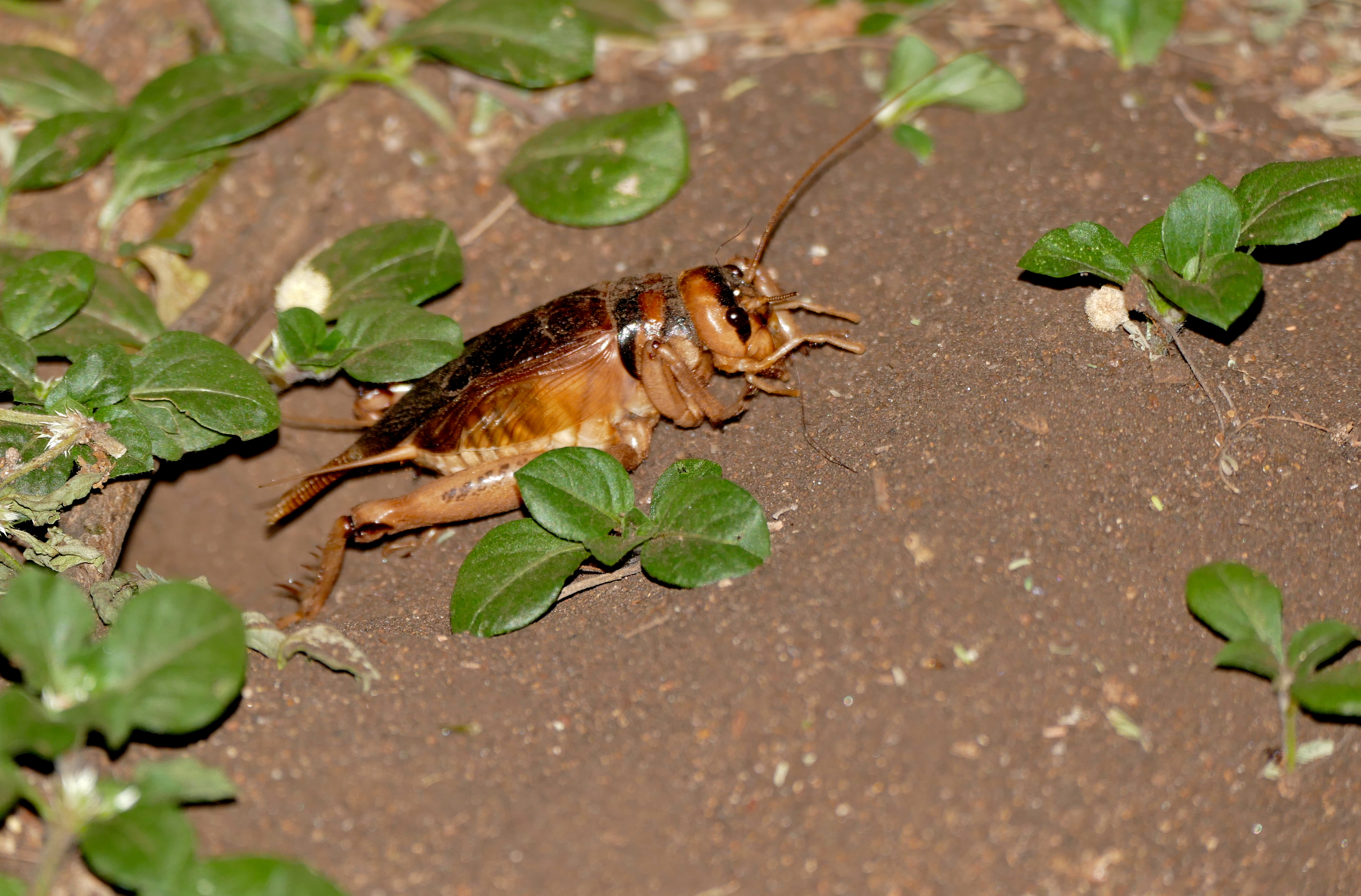

Scientific classification
- Kingdom: Animalia
- Phylum: Arthropoda
- Clade: Pancrustacea
- Class: Insecta
- Order: Orthoptera
- Suborder: Ensifera
- Family: Gryllidae
- Subfamily: Gryllinae
- Tribe: Gryllini
- Genus: Brachytrupes
- Species: B. membranaceus

Binomial name
- Brachytrupes membranaceus (Drury, 1770)

Synonyms
- Brachytrupes acuminipennis (Fairmaire, 1858); Brachytrupes gigas (Sulzer, 1776); Brachytrupes prodigiosa (Lichtenstein, 1796); Brachytrupes vastator (Burmeister, 1838); Brachytrupes vastatrix (Afzelius & Brannius, 1804)

= Brachytrupes membranaceus =

Species of cricket

Brachytrupes membranaceus, the tobacco cricket, is a species of cricket in the family Gryllidae. It is a pest of crops including young tobacco plants. There are four subspecies, all of which are native to Africa.

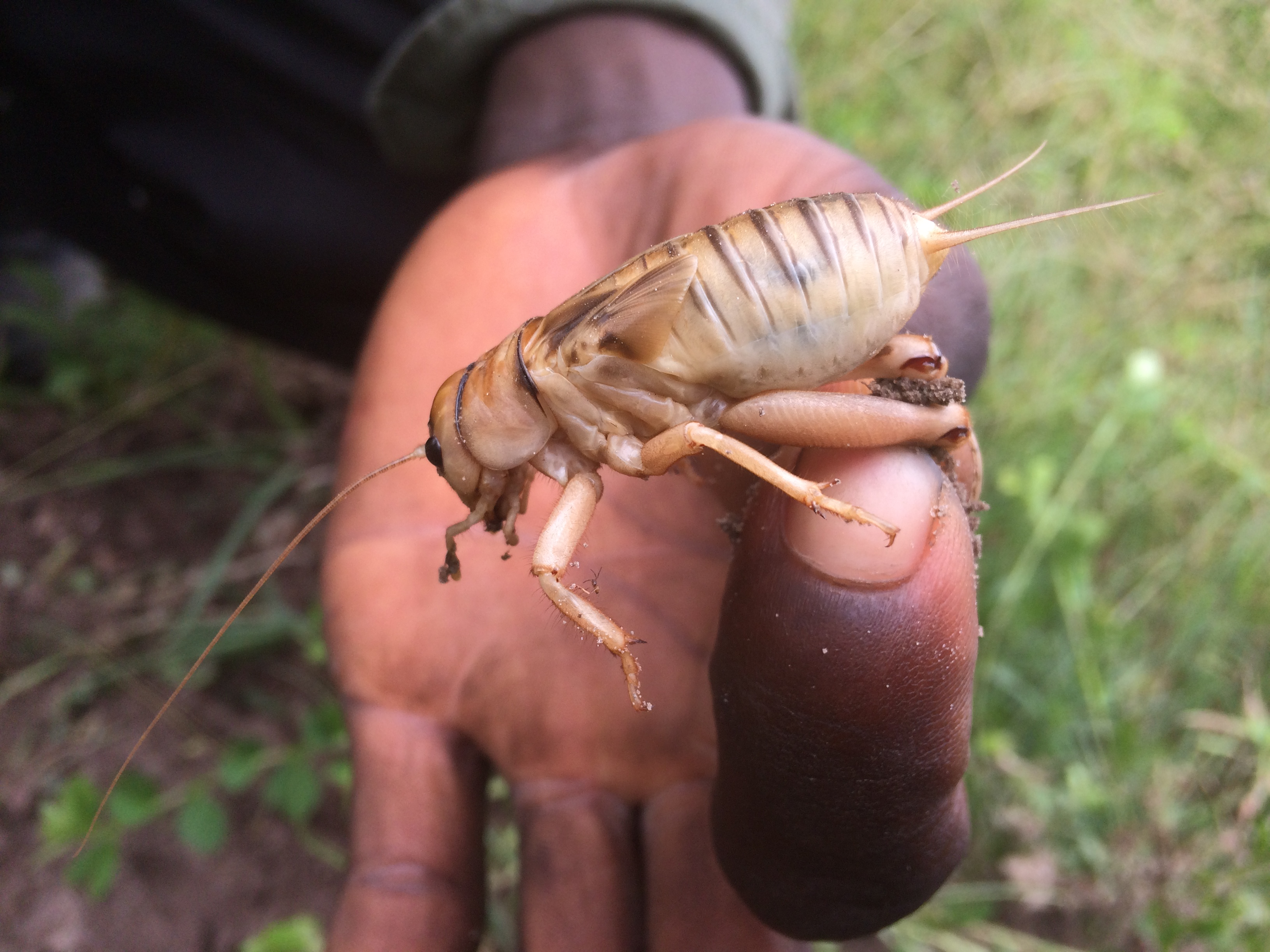
Brachytrupes membranaceus nymph in southern Ghana

== Subspecies ==
Four subspecies are recognised :

- B. m. colosseus Saussure, 1899 – Madagascar
- B. m. hoggarensis Chopard, 1941 – Algeria
- B. m. mauritanicus Chopard, 1952 – Mauritania
- B. m. membranaceus (Drury, 1770) – Kenya, Tanzania and other countries in East Africa

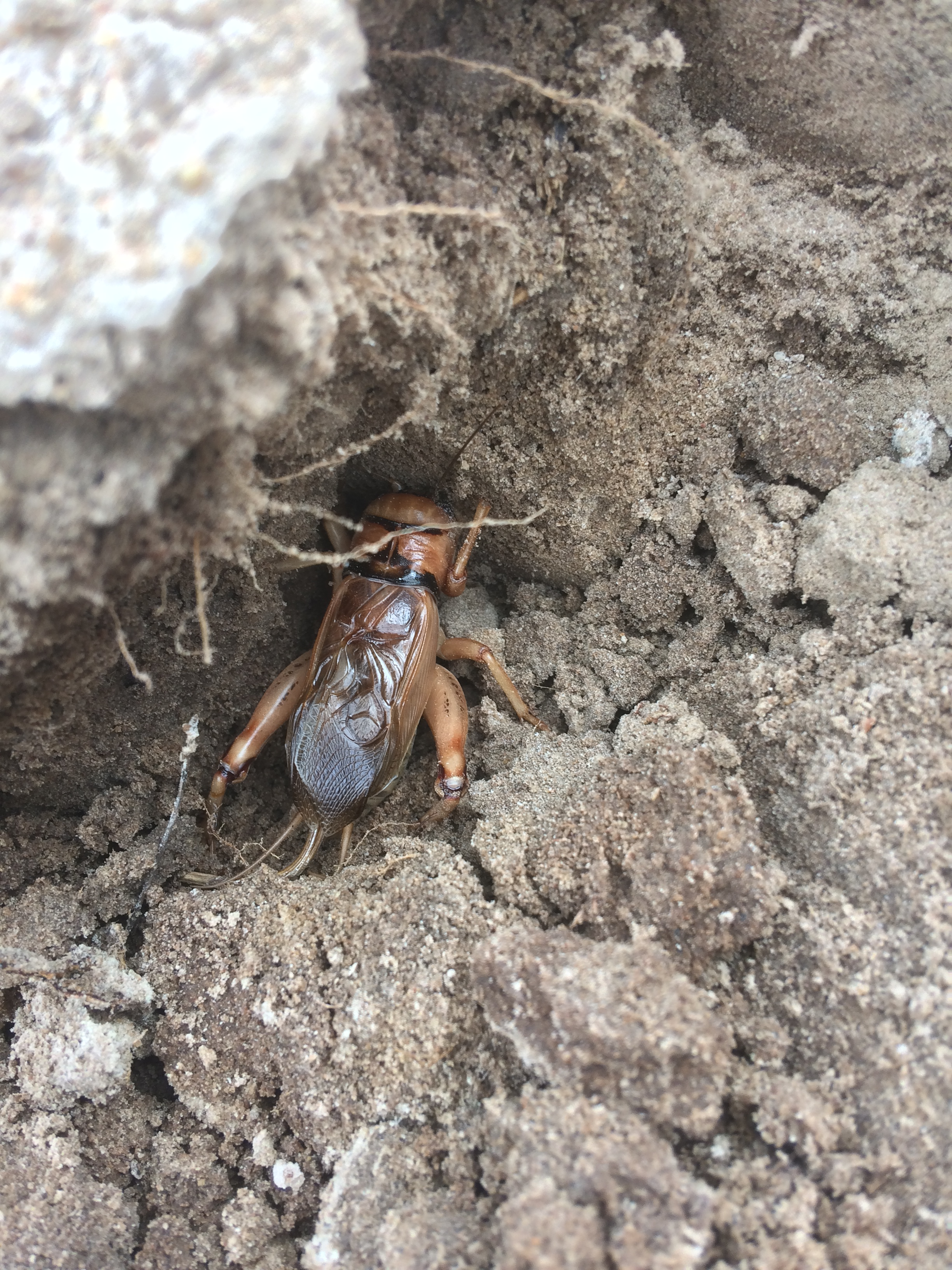
Adult Brachytrupes membranaceus found in burrow in crop field in southern Ghana

== Description ==
The adult B. membranaceus has a plump brown body, a broad blunt head, long antennae and powerful legs. It has a head-and-body length of 4 to 5 centimetres (1.6 to 2.0 in).

== Biology ==
Brachytrupes membranaceus is nocturnal. It digs a burrow that may be 50 to 80 centimetres (20 to 30 in) deep, with chambers in which it stores food. The burrow is dug by the mandibles, and the fore-legs are used to move loose soil and push it out of the entrance. An adult cricket may form a mound up to 30 centimetres (12 in) in height beside the burrow entrance.

The crickets live almost entirely underground, each in its own burrow. Mating takes place in the male's burrow and the female may remain there till the eggs are laid, in a walled-off side tunnel. In Zimbabwe, breeding takes place in February and March. The female lays around two hundred eggs which hatch about a month later. The nymphs crawl out of the burrow and disperse, each digging a burrow of its own. At first the nymphs grow rapidly but growth slows during the dry season from June to October. When succulent young plant material becomes available in November, growth rates speed up, with adults emerging from December onwards. There is just one generation each year.

The diet is grasses, succulent parts of plants and the suckers of trees such as Brachystegia and Isoberlinia. In cultivated areas, foodstuffs may include seedlings, transplanted plants, vegetables, tobacco, maize and field beans. Vegetable matter is carried underground and packed into storage chambers. It does not ferment, so it is probable that it is cut and allowed to wilt before being carried underground. Overly dry material may be allowed to soften with dew before storage.
