= Cranae (grasshopper) =

Scientific classification
- Kingdom: Animalia
- Phylum: Arthropoda
- Class: Insecta
- Order: Orthoptera
- Suborder: Caelifera
- Family: Acrididae
- Subfamily: Hemiacridinae
- Tribe: Cranaeini
- Genus: Cranae; Stål, 1878

Synonyms
- Cranaë [sic] Stål, 1878

Genus of grasshoppers

External image
- Images at iNaturalist

Cranae is a genus of Asian grasshoppers, typical of the tribe Cranaeini and erected by Carl Stål in 1878. Species have been recorded from India, Sri Lanka, Indochina, Malesia to New Guinea.

== Species ==
The Orthoptera Species File includes:

1. Cranae caprai Ramme, 1941
2. Cranae emendata Brunner von Wattenwyl, 1898
3. Cranae ferwillemsei Storozhenko, 2020
4. Cranae genjam Willemse, 1977
5. Cranae glabra Willemse, 1977
6. Cranae kuekenthali Brunner von Wattenwyl, 1898
7. Cranae lolobatensis Storozhenko, 2020
8. Cranae longipennis Willemse, 1977
9. Cranae luctuosa Bolívar, 1923
10. Cranae manokwari Willemse, 1977
11. Cranae nigroreticulata Brunner von Wattenwyl, 1898
12. Cranae patagiata Stål, 1878 - type species (by original monotypy)
13. Cranae pictipennis Willemse, 1932
14. Cranae rubra Willemse, 1977
15. Cranae rufipes Ramme, 1941
16. Cranae tibialis Brunner von Wattenwyl, 1898
17. Cranae trivittata Willemse, 1922
18. Cranae unistrigata (Haan, 1842)
