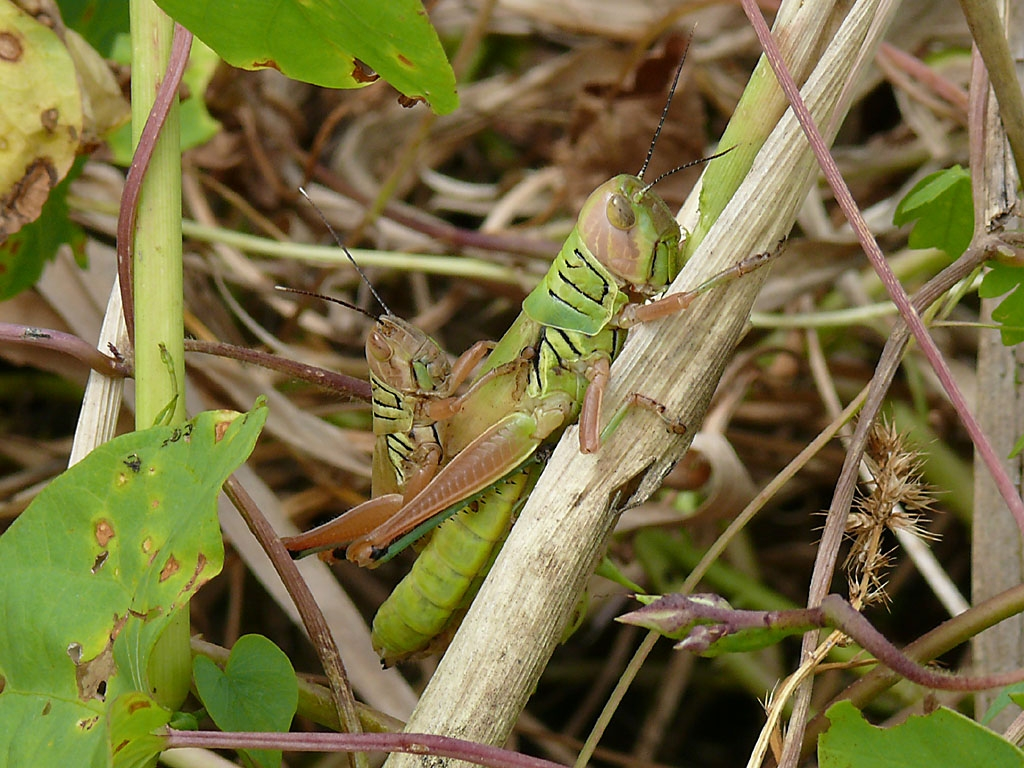
- Hieroglyphus daganensis

Scientific classification
- Kingdom: Animalia
- Phylum: Arthropoda
- Clade: Pancrustacea
- Class: Insecta
- Order: Orthoptera
- Suborder: Caelifera
- Superfamily: Acridoidea
- Family: Acrididae
- Subfamily: Hemiacridinae
- Tribe: Hieroglyphini
- Genus: Hieroglyphus; Krauss, 1877

Synonyms
- Miramia Uvarov, 1933

= Hieroglyphus =

Genus of grasshoppers

Hieroglyphus is a genus of grasshoppers in the family Acrididae: subfamily Hemiacridinae and the tribe Hieroglyphini Bolívar, 1912. Species can be found in Africa and Asia.

== Species ==
The Orthoptera Species File lists the following:

1. Hieroglyphus acuticercus Kumar & Usmani, 2015 - India
2. Hieroglyphus africanus Uvarov, 1922 - Sahel
3. Hieroglyphus akbari Riffat & Wagan, 2012 - Pakistan
4. Hieroglyphus annulicornis Shiraki, 1910 - India, Viet Nam, Taiwan
5. Hieroglyphus banian Fabricius, 1798 - India, Viet Nam
6. Hieroglyphus concolor Walker, 1870 - India, Indo-China
7. Hieroglyphus daganensis Krauss, 1877 - type species - Sahel
8. Hieroglyphus kolhapurnesis Swaminathan, Swaminathan & Nagar, 2017 - India
9. Hieroglyphus indicus Mason, 1973 - India
10. Hieroglyphus nigrorepletus Bolívar, 1912 - India
11. Hieroglyphus oryzivorus Carl, 1916 - India
12. Hieroglyphus perpolita Uvarov, 1933 - Pakistan
13. Hieroglyphus tonkinensis Bolívar, 1912 - Indo-China, eastern China

== Gallery ==
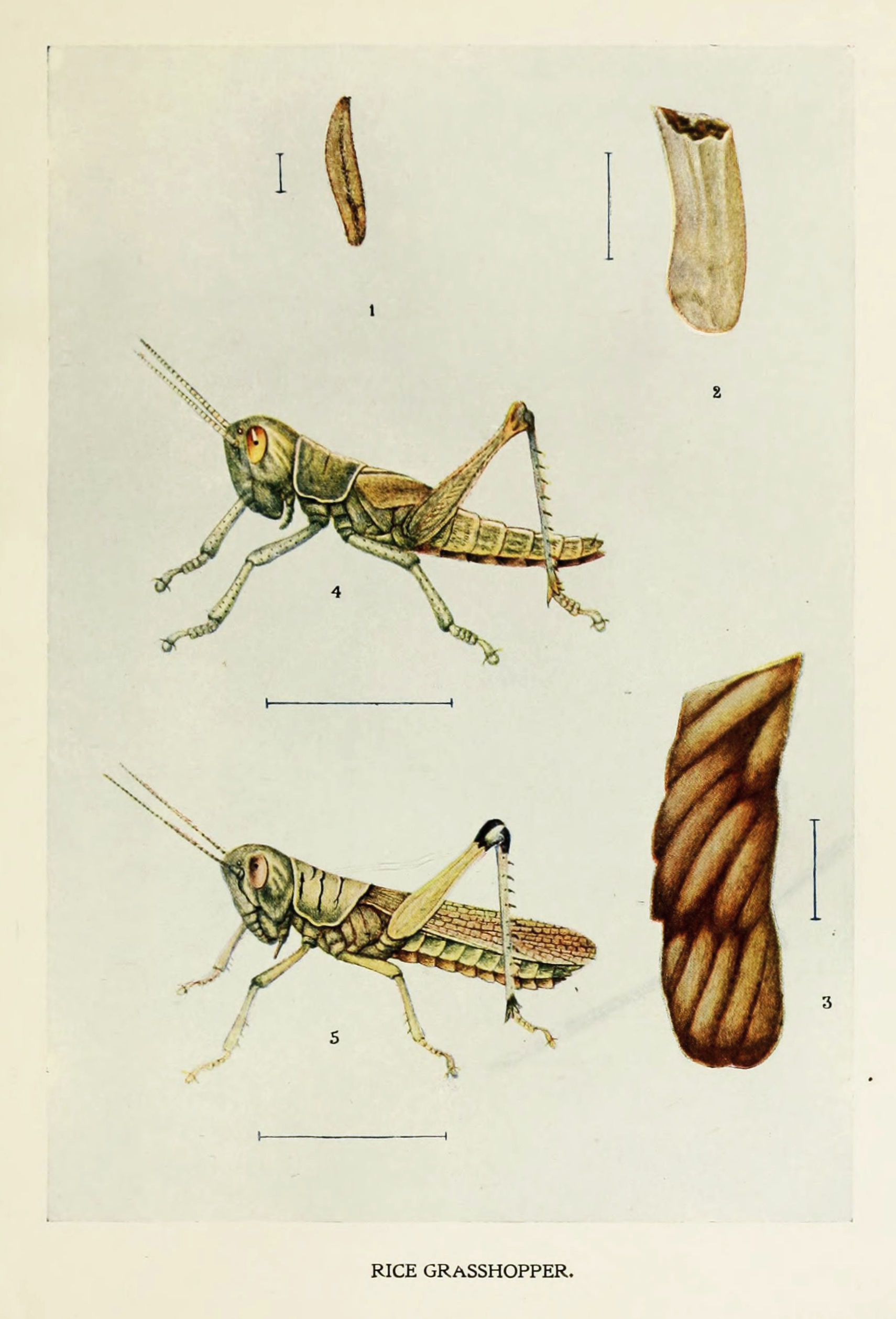
H. banian (syn. H. furcifer)

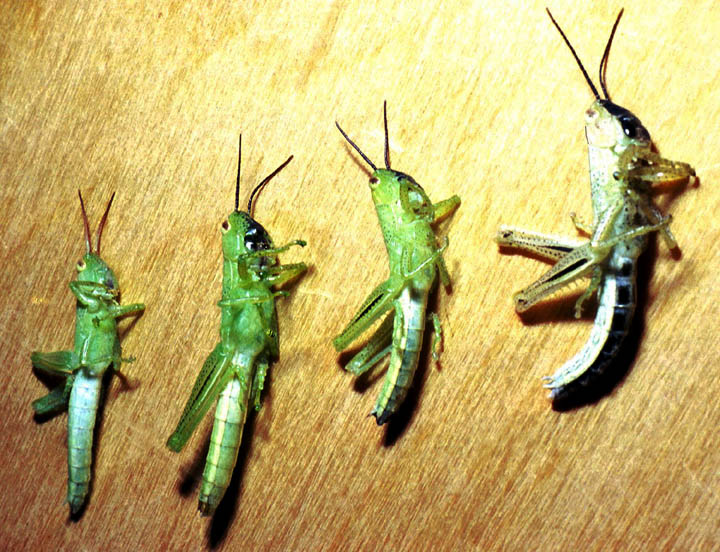
