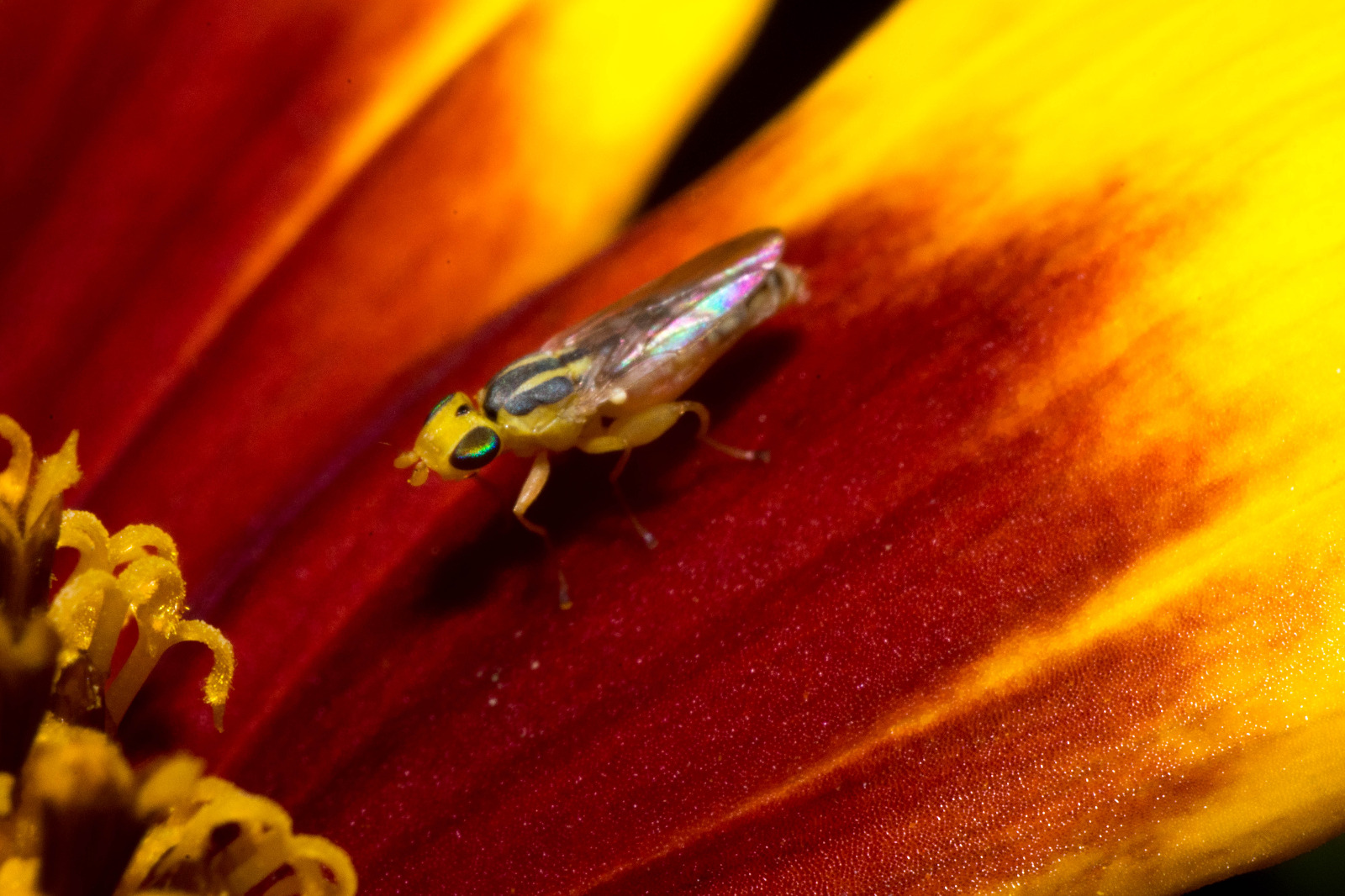

Scientific classification
- Domain: Eukaryota
- Kingdom: Animalia
- Phylum: Arthropoda
- Class: Insecta
- Order: Diptera
- Family: Chloropidae
- Subfamily: Chloropinae
- Genus: Meromyza; Meigen, 1830

= Meromyza =

Genus of flies

Meromyza sp. feeding

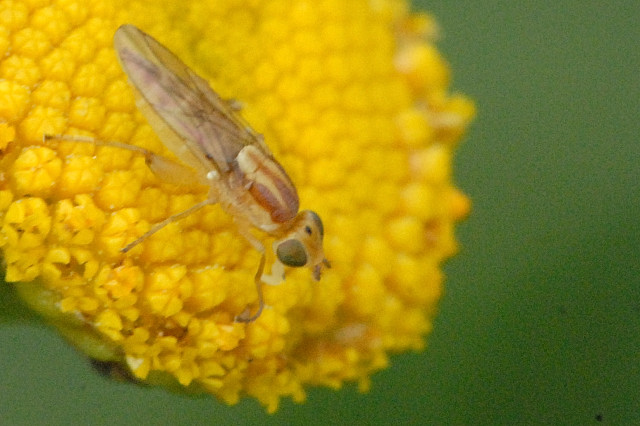
Meromyza saltatrix male

Meromyza is a genus of flies in the family Chloropidae.

== Species ==
- M. acutata An & Yang, 2005
- M. affinis Fedoseeva, 1971
- M. americana Fitch, 1856
- M. arizonica Fedoseeva, 1971
- M. athletica Fedoseeva, 1974
- M. balcanica Beschovski, 1996
- M. bipunctata Fedoseeva, 1971
- M. bohemica Fedoseeva, 1962
- M. canadensis Fedoseeva, 1971
- M. columbi Fedoseeva, 1971
- M. communis Fedoseeva, 1971
- M. congruens An & Yang, 2005
- M. conifera Fedoseeva, 1971
- M. curvinervis (Zetterstedt, 1848)
- M. eduardi Hubicka, 1966
- M. elbergi Fedoseeva, 1979
- M. facialis Fedoseeva, 1979
- M. femorata Macquart, 1835
- M. flavipalpis Malloch, 1914
- M. frontosa Fedoseeva, 1971
- M. griseothorax Strobl, 1910
- M. hispanica Fedoseeva, 1971
- M. hungarica Dely-Draskovits, 1978
- M. ingrica Nartshuk, 1992
- M. laeta Meigen, 1830
- M. laurelae Fedoseeva, 1971
- M. lidiae Nartshuk, 1992
- M. marginata Becker, 1912
- M. modesta Fedoseeva, 1978
- M. mosquensis Fedoseeva, 1960
- M. mutabilis Fedoseeva, 1971
- M. neglecta Fedoseeva, 1974
- M. neimengensis An & Yang, 2005
- M. nigriseta Fedoseeva, 1960
- M. nigriventris Macquart, 1835
- M. obtusa Peterfi, 1961
- M. opacula Fedoseeva, 1978
- M. ornata (Wiedemann, 1817)
- M. palposa Fedoseeva, 1960
- M. pilosa Fedoseeva, 1971
- M. pleurosetosa Beschovski, 1987
- M. pluriseta Peterfi, 1961
- M. pratorum Meigen, 1830
- M. quadrimaculata Fedoseeva, 1961
- M. rara Fedoseeva, 1971
- M. rohdendorfi Fedoseeva, 1974
- M. rostrata Hubicka, 1966
- M. rotundata Hubicka, 1966
- M. rufa Fedoseeva, 1962
- M. sabroskyi Fedoseeva, 1971
- M. saltatrix (Linnaeus, 1761)
- M. sibirica Fedoseeva, 1961
- M. smirnovi Fedoseeva, 1964
- M. transbaicalica Fedoseeva, 1967
- M. triangulina Fedoseeva, 1960
- M. truncata Fedoseeva, 1971
- M. variegata Meigen, 1830
- M. virescens von Roser, 1840
- M. vladimirovae Fedoseeva, 1978
- M. zachvatkini Fedoseeva, 1960
- M. zimzerla Nartshuk, 1992
