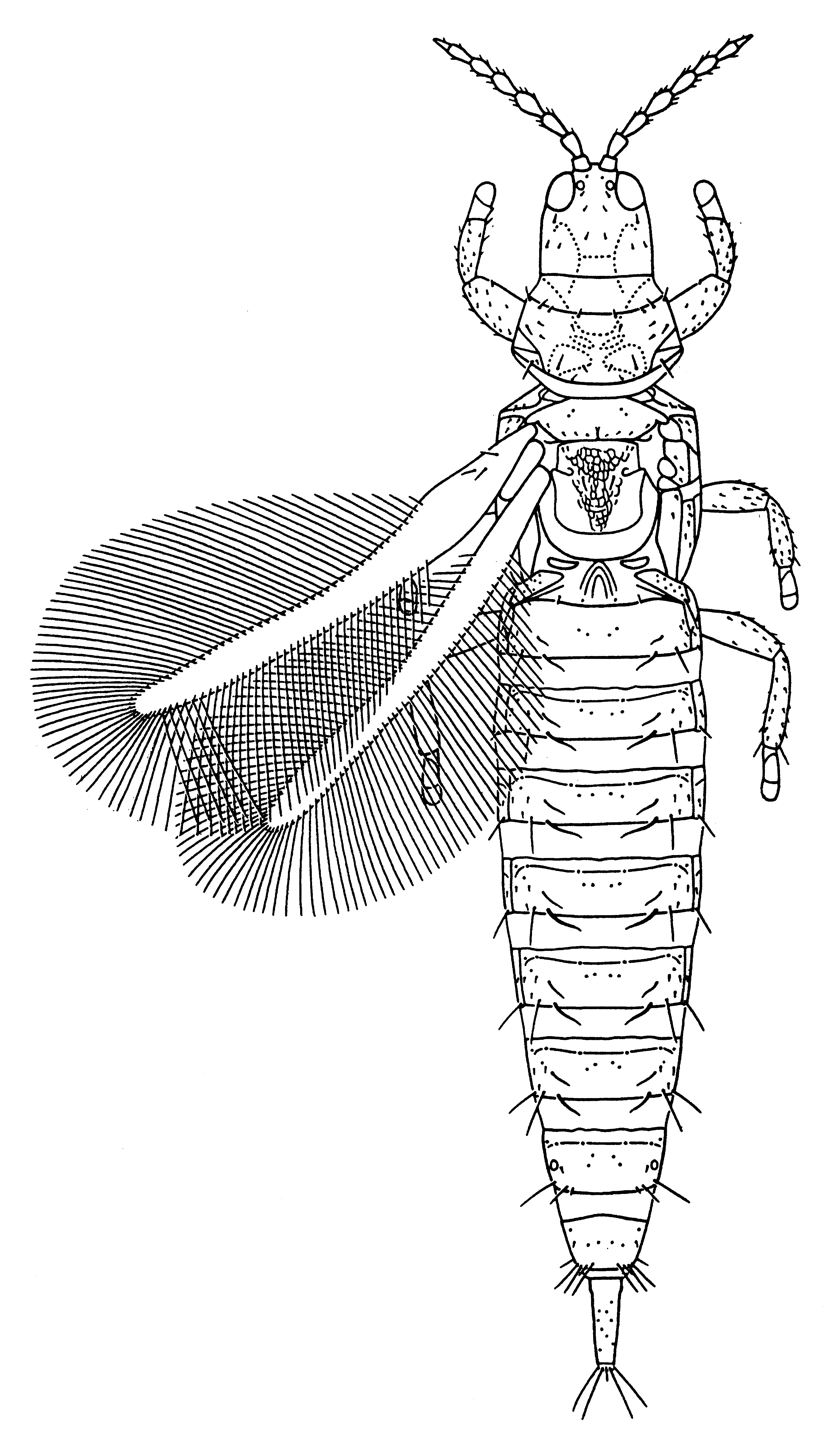
- Haplothrips niger by Des Helmore

Scientific classification
- Kingdom: Animalia
- Phylum: Arthropoda
- Clade: Pancrustacea
- Class: Insecta
- Order: Thysanoptera
- Family: Phlaeothripidae
- Subfamily: Phlaeothripinae
- Genus: Haplothrips; Amyot & Serville, 1843

= Haplothrips =

Genus of thrips

Haplothrips is a genus of thrips in the family Phlaeothripidae. It is found worldwide and contains about 240 extant species.

== Description ==
Thrips of this genus are medium-sized with one pair of 8-segmented antennae, three pairs of legs and usually two pairs of well-developed wings (macropterous). The head has a short mouth cone and a pair of deeply retracted maxillary stylets. The forewings are distinctly constricted in the middle and (in subgenus Haplothrips) have duplicated cilia. The second through to the seventh abdominal tergites each have two pairs of sigmoid wing-retaining setae. In males, the ninth abdominal tergite has setae S2 short and stout, while the eight abdominal sternite usually has no pore plate. The male of H. dissociatus is unusual in having a small pore plate.

Some of the aforementioned features, such as the forewing constriction, are shared by other Haplothripini.

== Ecology ==
Haplothrips mostly feed and breed in flowers. The northern hemisphere species prefer flowers of Asteraceae and Poaceae, while the Australian species feed on a range of families. Some species are instead associated with leaves.

Other Haplothrips are predatory. Examples are H. faurei and H. victoriensis, which are used in biological control of mites.

The Hawaiian species H. rosai is believed to feed on fungi.

== Pests ==
Haplothrips aculeatus and H. ganglbaueri are pests of millet, while unspecified Haplothrips species are pests of cashew.

== Selected species ==
- Haplothrips aculeatus (Fabricius, 1803)
- Haplothrips articulosus Bagnall, 1926
- Haplothrips cerealis Priesner, 1939
- Haplothrips clarisetis Priesner, 1930
- Haplothrips distinguendus Uzel, 1895
- Haplothrips fuliginosus Schille, 1912
- Haplothrips gowdeyi (Franklin, 1908)
- Haplothrips graminis Hood, 1912
- Haplothrips habermani Strassen, 1964
- Haplothrips halophilus Hood, 1915
- Haplothrips herajius Minaei & Aleosfoor, 2013
- Haplothrips kurdjumovi (Karny, 1913)
- Haplothrips leucanthemi (Schrank, 1781)
- Haplothrips malifloris Hood, 1916
- Haplothrips minutus (Uzel, 1895)
- Haplothrips nigricornis Bagnall, 1910
- Haplothrips nubilipennis Hood, 1914
- Haplothrips preeri Hood, 1939
- Haplothrips rectipennis Hood, 1927
- Haplothrips reuteri (Karny, 1907)
- Haplothrips robustus Bagnall, 1918
- Haplothrips ruber (Moulton, 1911)
- Haplothrips setiger Priesner, 1921
- Haplothrips shacklefordi Moulton, 1927
- Haplothrips stactices (Haliday, 1836)
- Haplothrips subterraneus Crawford, 1938
- Haplothrips verbasci (Osborn, 1897)
- Haplothrips xanthocrepis Hood, 1940

== Identification ==
- Australian thrips of the Haplothrips lineage (Insecta: Thysanoptera) (includes key to Australian Haplothrips)
- Identification of Haplothrips species from Malesia (Thysanoptera, Phlaeothripinae)
- New Neotropical Haplothripini (Thysanoptera: Phlaeothripidae) with a key to Central and South American genera (includes key to Neotropical Haplothrips)
