= Haplothrips leucanthemi =

Scientific classification
- Kingdom: Animalia
- Phylum: Arthropoda
- Clade: Pancrustacea
- Class: Insecta
- Order: Thysanoptera
- Family: Phlaeothripidae
- Genus: Haplothrips
- Species: H. leucanthemi

Binomial name
- Haplothrips leucanthemi (Schrank, 1781)

Synonyms
- Haplothrips niger Osborn, 1883

Species of thrip

Haplothrips leucanthemi, known generally as the clover thrips or red clover thrips, is a species of tube-tailed thrips in the family Phlaeothripidae. It is found in North America, South America, and Europe.
