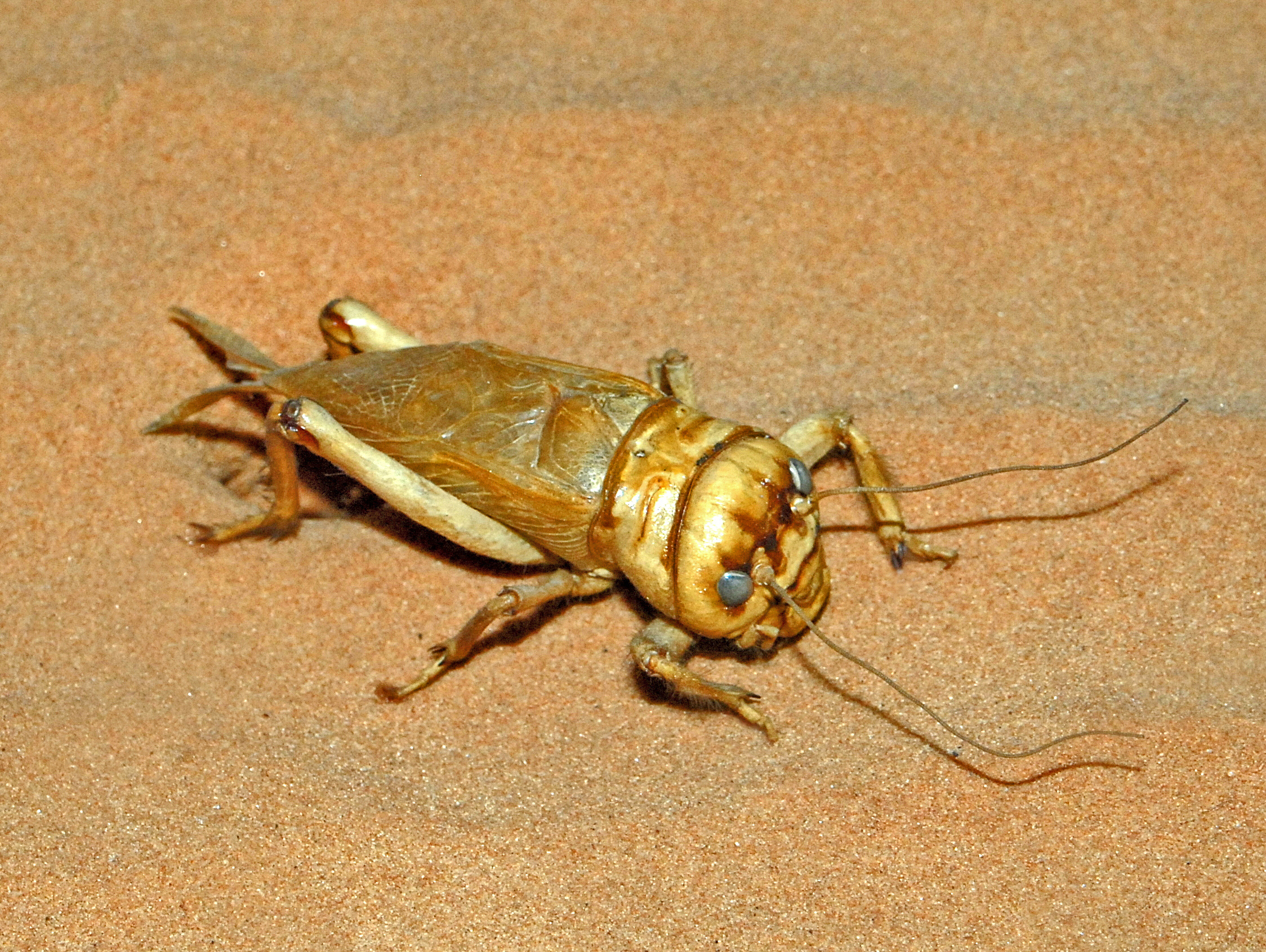
- Brachytrupes megacephalus

Scientific classification
- Domain: Eukaryota
- Kingdom: Animalia
- Phylum: Arthropoda
- Class: Insecta
- Order: Orthoptera
- Suborder: Ensifera
- Family: Gryllidae
- Tribe: Gryllini
- Genus: Brachytrupes; Serville, 1839

Synonyms
- Brachytrypes Agassiz, 1846; Brachytrypus Saussure, 1877

= Brachytrupes =

Genus of crickets

Brachytrupes is a genus of mostly African crickets in the family Gryllidae.

== Species ==
- Brachytrupes calaharicus (Karny, 1910)
- Brachytrupes chopardi (Uvarov, 1922)
- Brachytrupes grandidieri (Saussure, 1877)
- Brachytrupes megacephalus (Lefèvre, 1827)
- Brachytrupes membranaceus (Drury, 1773) - type species (as Gryllus membranaceus Drury = B. membranaceus membranaceus)
- Brachytrupes politus (Bolivar, I., 1890)
- Brachytrupes testaceus (Karny, 1910)

Note: "Brachytrupes portentosus" (Lichtenstein AAH, 1796) is a synonym of Tarbinskiellus portentosus: found in Asia.
