= Meromyza americana =

Scientific classification
- Kingdom: Animalia
- Phylum: Arthropoda
- Class: Insecta
- Order: Diptera
- Family: Chloropidae
- Genus: Meromyza
- Species: M. americana

Binomial name
- Meromyza americana Fitch, 1856

Species of fly

Meromyza americana is a fly species in the family Chloropidae. It is a pest of millets.
