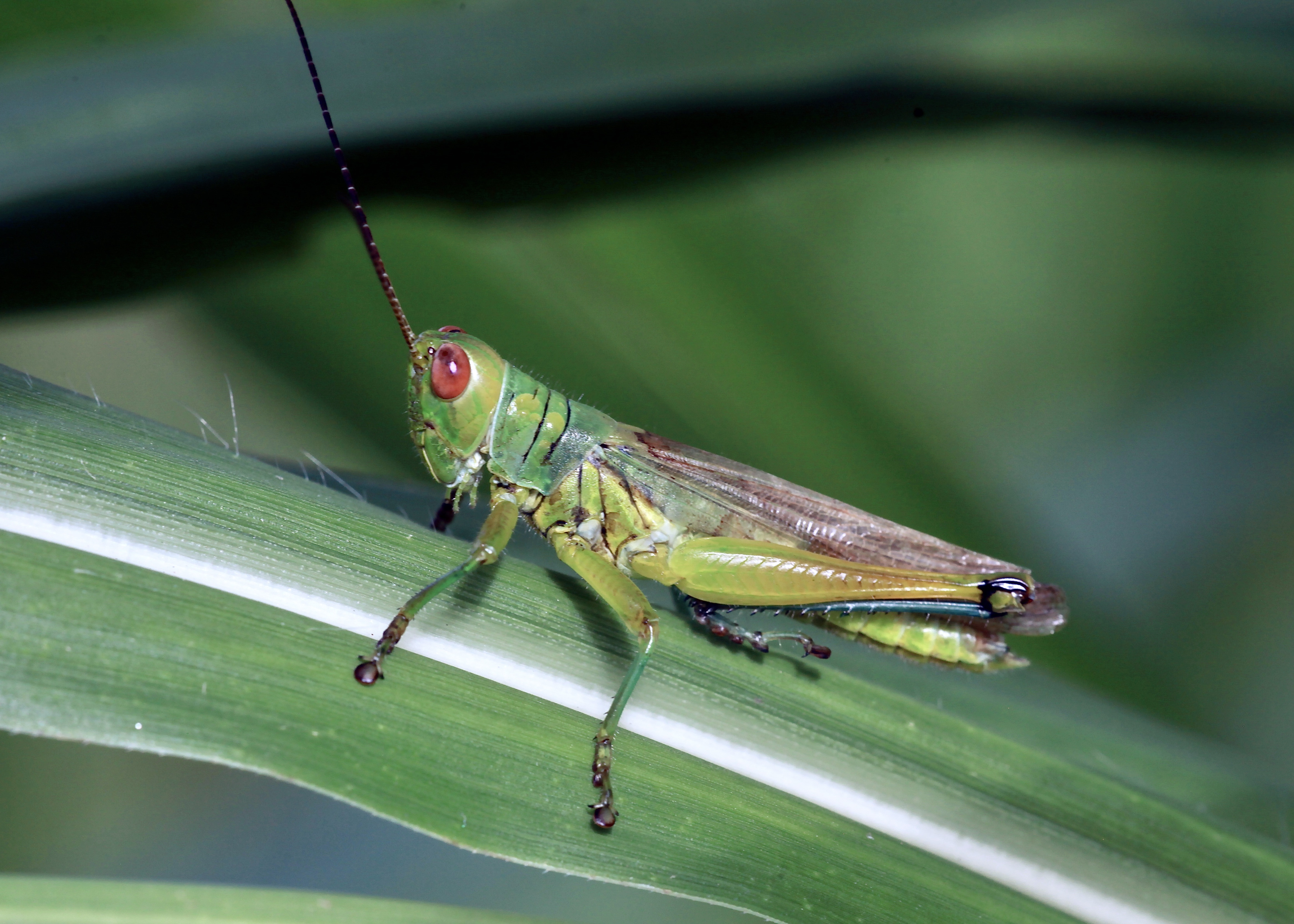

Scientific classification
- Kingdom: Animalia
- Phylum: Arthropoda
- Clade: Pancrustacea
- Class: Insecta
- Order: Orthoptera
- Suborder: Caelifera
- Family: Acrididae
- Genus: Hieroglyphus
- Species: H. banian

Binomial name
- Hieroglyphus banian (Fabricius, 1798)

Synonyms
- Gryllus banian

= Hieroglyphus banian =

Species of grasshopper

Hieroglyphus banian is a species of grasshopper in the family Acrididae. It is a pest of millets such as sorghum, pearl millet, and finger millet in India. It is an annual pest and the eggs require the cycle of dry summer followed by monsoon rains to hatch. The species has an olfactory neuronal pathway remarkably similar to that of Schistocerca.
