= Haplothrips aculeatus =

Scientific classification
- Kingdom: Animalia
- Phylum: Arthropoda
- Class: Insecta
- Order: Thysanoptera
- Family: Phlaeothripidae
- Genus: Haplothrips
- Species: H. aculeatus

Binomial name
- Haplothrips aculeatus (F., 1803)

Synonyms
- Thrips aculeatus

Species of thrips

Haplothrips aculeatus is a species of thrips. It is a pest of millets such as sorghum, finger millet, pearl millet, and foxtail millet in Asia.
