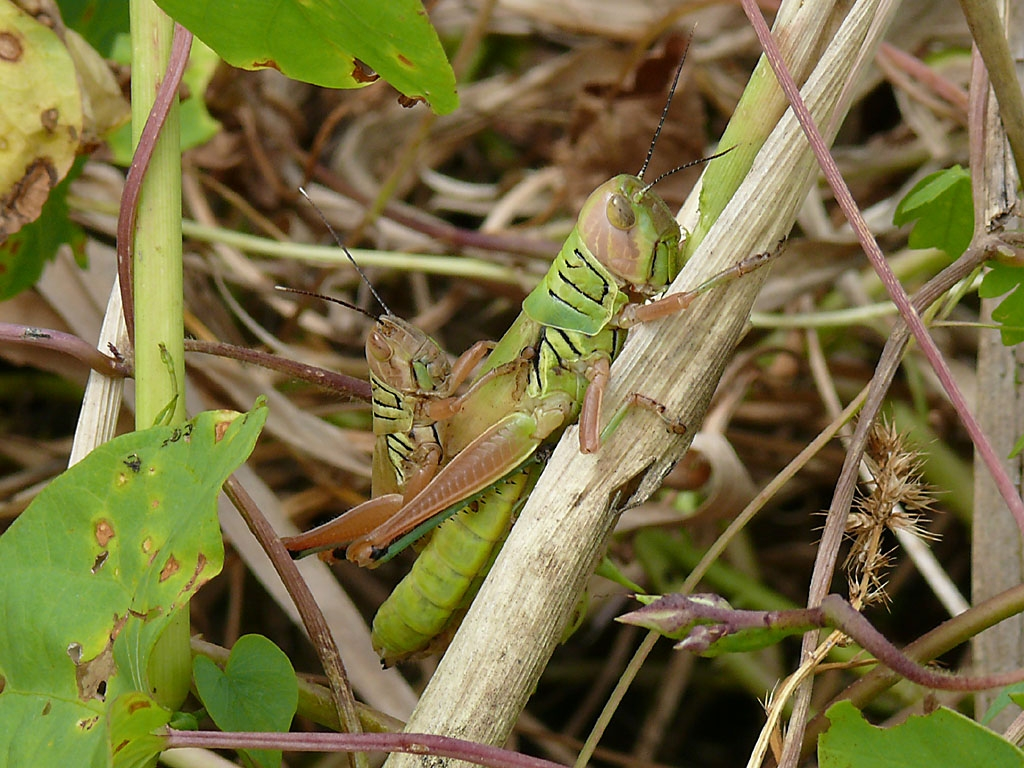
- Hieroglyphus daganensis

Scientific classification
- Kingdom: Animalia
- Phylum: Arthropoda
- Clade: Pancrustacea
- Class: Insecta
- Order: Orthoptera
- Suborder: Caelifera
- Infraorder: Acrididea
- Nanorder: Acridomorpha
- Superfamily: Acridoidea
- Family: Acrididae
- Subfamily: Hemiacridinae; Dirsh, 1956

= Hemiacridinae =

Subfamily of grasshoppers

The Hemiacridinae are a subfamily of Acrididae in the Orthoptera: Caelifera. Species can be found in Africa and Asia.

== Tribes and genera ==
The Orthoptera Species File lists the following:

=== Cranaeini ===
Authority: Brunner von Wattenwyl, 1893 - India, Indochina to New Guinea

1. Cranae (grasshopper) Stål, 1878
2. Cranaella Ramme, 1941
3. Craneopsis Willemse, 1933
4. Opiptacris Walker, 1870
5. Paracranae Willemse, 1931 (monotypic)
6. Phalaca Bolívar, 1906
7. Philicranae Willemse, 1955 (monotypic)

=== Dirshacrini ===
Authority: Spearman, 2013 – southern Africa

1. Dirshacris Brown, 1959
2. Euloryma Spearman, 2013 (synonym Loryma Stål, 1878)
3. Hemiloryma Brown, 1973
4. Labidioloryma Grunshaw, 1986

=== Gergisini ===
Authority: Dirsh, 1962 - Madagascar

1. Gergis (grasshopper) Stål, 1875
2. Malagasacris Rehn, 1944
3. Morondavia Dirsh, 1962
4. Pachyceracris Dirsh, 1962

=== Hemiacridini ===
Authority: Dirsh 1956 - Africa

1. Hemiacris Walker, 1870
2. Hemipristocorypha Dirsh, 1952
3. Pristocorypha Karsch, 1896

=== Hieroglyphini ===
Authority: Bolívar, 1912 – Sahel, tropical Asia

1. Hieroglyphodes Uvarov, 1922
2. Hieroglyphus Krauss, 1877
3. Parahieroglyphus Carl, 1916

=== Leptacrini ===
Authority: Johnston, 1956 – Africa, Asia

1. Acanthoxia Bolívar, 1906
2. Leptacris Walker, 1870
3. Meruana Sjöstedt, 1909
4. Sudanacris Uvarov, 1944

=== Mesopserini ===
Authority: Otte, 1995 – Africa including Madagascar

1. Mesopsera Bolívar, 1908
2. Xenippa Stål, 1878
3. Xenippacris Descamps & Wintrebert, 1966

=== tribe not assigned ===
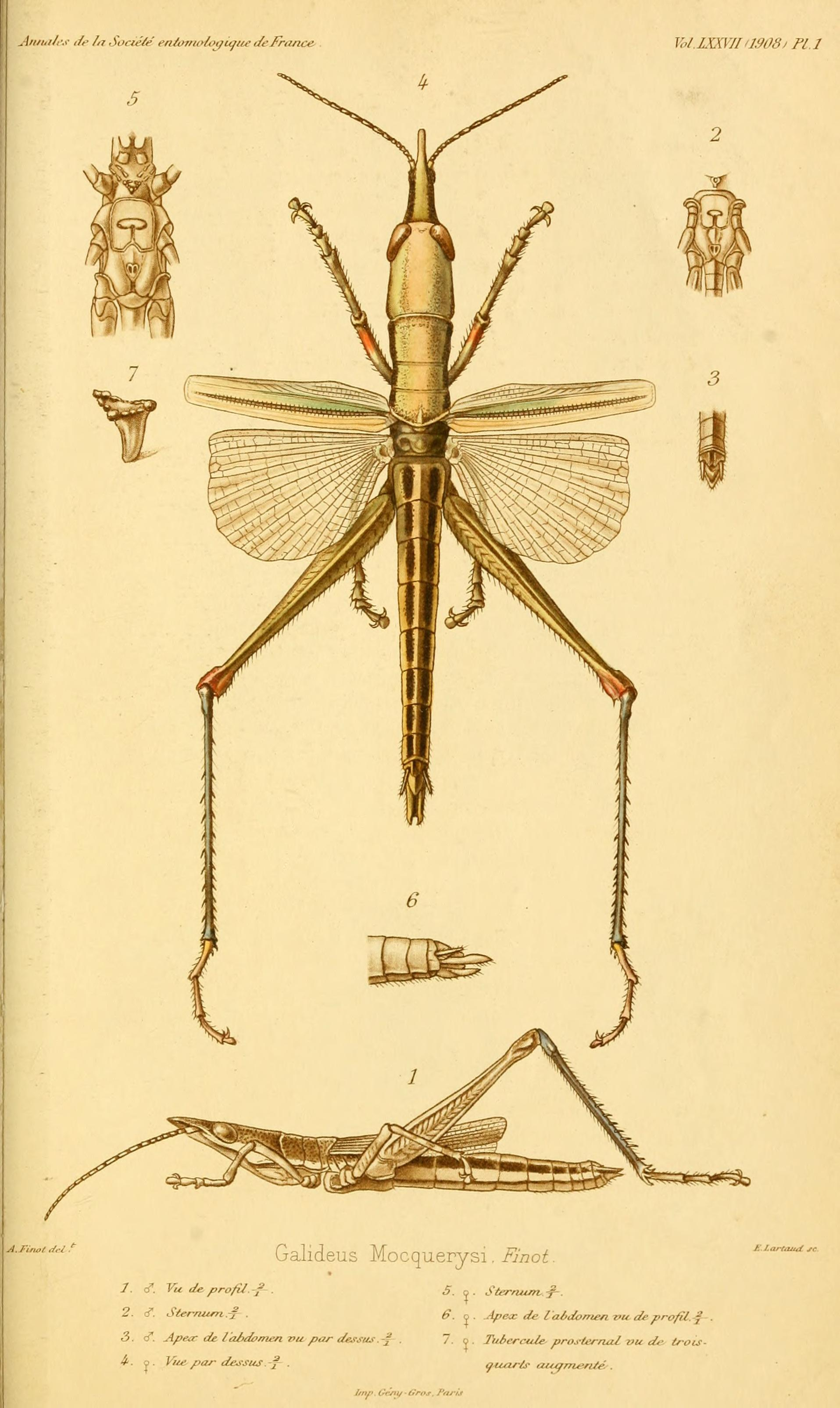
Galideus Finot, 1908

1. Aphanaulacris Uvarov, 1925
2. Calamippa Henry, 1940
3. Clonacris Uvarov, 1943
4. Euthymia (grasshopper) Stål, 1875
5. Galideus Finot, 1908
6. Glauningia: G. macrocephala Ramme, 1929
7. Hysiella Bolívar, 1906
8. Kassongia Bolívar, 1908
9. Limnippa: L. ensicerca Uvarov, 1941
10. Lopheuthymia Uvarov, 1943
11. Onetes Rehn, 1944
12. Oraistes: O. luridus Karsch, 1896
13. Paulianiobia Dirsh & Descamps, 1968
14. Proeuthymia Rehn, 1944
15. Pseudoserpusia Dirsh, 1962
16. Willemsella Miller, 1934
17. Xenippella: X. bicolor Kevan, 1966
18. Xenippoides: X. elongatus Chopard, 1952
