= Otteana dilinhensis =

Scientific classification
- Domain: Eukaryota
- Kingdom: Animalia
- Phylum: Arthropoda
- Class: Insecta
- Order: Orthoptera
- Suborder: Ensifera
- Family: Gryllidae
- Genus: Otteana
- Species: O. dilinhensis

Binomial name
- Otteana dilinhensis (Otte, 1988)

Synonyms
- Pteroplistus dilinhensis Otte, 1988

Species of cricket

Otteana dilinhensis is a species of cricket in the subfamily Landrevinae, found in Vietnam.

== Systematics ==
The species was first described in 1988 by Daniel Otte and placed under Pteroplistinae as Pteroplistus dilinhensis. A reassessment in 1990 by Andrey Vasilevich Gorokhov moved it to Otteana.
