= Eleva =

Eleva may refer to:

- Eleva Electric Mobility, an Indian electric vehicle and clean energy company based in New Delhi, India.
- Eleva, Wisconsin, the USA village
- Eleva (insect), a genus of crickets in the tribe Landrevini.
- Sertraline, a brand name of a medication that is also known as Zoloft
