= Otteana =

Scientific classification
- Domain: Eukaryota
- Kingdom: Animalia
- Phylum: Arthropoda
- Class: Insecta
- Order: Orthoptera
- Suborder: Ensifera
- Family: Gryllidae
- Subfamily: Landrevinae
- Tribe: Landrevini
- Genus: Otteana; Gorochov, 1990

Genus of crickets

Otteana is a genus of crickets in the subfamily Landrevinae and tribe Landrevini. Species can be found in Vietnam.

== Species ==
Otteana includes the following species:

- Otteana dilinhensis (Otte, 1988) - type species (as Pteroplistus dilinhensis Otte)
- Otteana truncicola Gorochov, 1996
