= Tramlapiola sylvestris =

Scientific classification
- Kingdom: Animalia
- Phylum: Arthropoda
- Class: Insecta
- Order: Orthoptera
- Suborder: Ensifera
- Superfamily: Grylloidea
- Family: Pteroplistidae
- Subfamily: Pteroplistinae
- Genus: Tramlapiola
- Species: T. sylvestris

Binomial name
- Tramlapiola sylvestris Gorochov, 1990

Species of cricket-like animal

Tramlapiola sylvestris is the type species of crickets in its genus and belongs to the family Pteroplistidae. It is found in Vietnam. No subspecies are included in the Catalogue of Life.
