= Copholandrevus =

Scientific classification
- Domain: Eukaryota
- Kingdom: Animalia
- Phylum: Arthropoda
- Class: Insecta
- Order: Orthoptera
- Suborder: Ensifera
- Family: Gryllidae
- Subfamily: Landrevinae
- Tribe: Landrevini
- Genus: Copholandrevus; Chopard, 1925

Genus of crickets

Copholandrevus is an Australian genus of crickets in the tribe Landrevini.

== Taxonomy ==
The Orthoptera Species File database lists the following species:

- Copholandrevus australicus Chopard, 1925 - type species
- Copholandrevus brevicauda Chopard, 1930
