= Repapa =

Scientific classification
- Domain: Eukaryota
- Kingdom: Animalia
- Phylum: Arthropoda
- Class: Insecta
- Order: Orthoptera
- Suborder: Ensifera
- Family: Gryllidae
- Subfamily: Landrevinae
- Tribe: Landrevini
- Genus: Repapa; Otte, 1988

Genus of crickets

Repapa is a genus of crickets in the subfamily Landrevinae and tribe Landrevini. Species can be found in South-East Asia.

== Species ==
Repapa includes the following species:

- Repapa brevipes Chopard, 1937
- Repapa denticulata Gorochov, 2016
- Repapa sapagaya Otte, 1988 - type species (locality: Sandakan, Sabah)
- Repapa tenompokae Otte, 1988
- Repapa trusmadi Gorochov, 2016
