= Creolandreva =

Scientific classification
- Kingdom: Animalia
- Phylum: Arthropoda
- Clade: Pancrustacea
- Class: Insecta
- Order: Orthoptera
- Suborder: Ensifera
- Family: Gryllidae
- Subfamily: Landrevinae
- Tribe: Prolandrevini
- Genus: Creolandreva; Hugel, 2009

Genus of crickets

Creolandreva is a genus of insect, belonging to the family Gryllidae. The species of this genus occur in La Réunion and in Mauritius.

== Species ==
- Creolandrevan aptera Hugel, 2009 - (Réunion)
- Creolandreva brachyptera Hugel, 2009 - (Mauritius)
- Creolandreva chaloupensis Hugel, 2009 - (Réunion)
- Creolandreva cocottensis Hugel, 2009 - (Mauritius)
- Creolandreva crepitans Hugel, 2009 - (Mauritius)
- Creolandreva crypta Hugel, 2009 - (Réunion)
- Creolandreva pollexensis Hugel, 2009 - (Mauritius)
