= Tramlapiola =

Scientific classification
- Domain: Eukaryota
- Kingdom: Animalia
- Phylum: Arthropoda
- Class: Insecta
- Order: Orthoptera
- Suborder: Ensifera
- Family: Pteroplistidae
- Subfamily: Pteroplistinae
- Genus: Tramlapiola; Gorochov, 1990

Genus of crickets

Tramlapiola is a genus of crickets in the family Pteroplistidae, erected by Andrej Gorochov in 1990. Species have only been recorded from Vietnam.

== Species ==
The Orthoptera Species File lists:

- Tramlapiola bugiamap Gorochov, 2018
- Tramlapiola sylvestris Gorochov, 1990 - type species
