= Duolandrevus =

Scientific classification
- Domain: Eukaryota
- Kingdom: Animalia
- Phylum: Arthropoda
- Class: Insecta
- Order: Orthoptera
- Suborder: Ensifera
- Family: Gryllidae
- Subfamily: Landrevinae
- Tribe: Landrevini
- Genus: Duolandrevus; Kirby, 1906

Genus of crickets

External image
- Images at iNaturalist

Duolandrevus is a genus of crickets in the subfamily Landrevinae and tribe Landrevini. Species can be found in Asia.

== Species ==
Duolandrevus includes the following species, with eight identified subgenera:

subgenus Bejorama Otte, 1988

- Duolandrevus aequatorialis Gorochov, 2003
- Duolandrevus balabacus Otte, 1988
- Duolandrevus bonus Gorochov, 2005
- Duolandrevus deliensis Gorochov, 2000
- Duolandrevus doloduo Gorochov, 2016
- Duolandrevus firmus Gorochov, 2000
- Duolandrevus gingoogus Otte, 1988
- Duolandrevus improvisus Gorochov & Warchalowska-Sliwa, 2004
- Duolandrevus intermedius Chopard, 1969
- Duolandrevus krabi Gorochov, 2000
- Duolandrevus lambir Gorochov, 2017
- Duolandrevus luzonensis Otte, 1988
- Duolandrevus modestus Gorochov & Warchalowska-Sliwa, 2004
- Duolandrevus mostovskyi Gorochov, 2000
- Duolandrevus obliteratus Gorochov, 2016
- Duolandrevus parvulus Gorochov, 2016
- Duolandrevus praestans Gorochov, 2003
- Duolandrevus soekarandae Gorochov, 2000

subgenus Duolandrevus Kirby, 1906 (synonym Sutepia Otte, 1988)

- Duolandrevus balikpapan Gorochov, 2016
- Duolandrevus bannanus Zhang, Liu & Shi, 2017
- Duolandrevus bengkulu Gorochov, 2016
- Duolandrevus brachypterus (Haan, 1844) – type species (as Gryllus brachypterus Haan; locality: Soekaboemi [Sukabumi], Java)
- Duolandrevus coulonianus (Saussure, 1877)
- Duolandrevus curup Gorochov, 2016
- Duolandrevus kalimantan Gorochov, 2016
- Duolandrevus karnyi Otte, 1988
- Duolandrevus kubah Gorochov, 2016
- Duolandrevus lampung Gorochov, 2016
- Duolandrevus manna Gorochov, 2016
- Duolandrevus matang Gorochov, 2017
- Duolandrevus pendleburyi Otte, 1988
- Duolandrevus rufus Chopard, 1931
- Duolandrevus sabah Gorochov, 2016
- Duolandrevus selatan Gorochov, 2016
- Duolandrevus spinicauda Gorochov, 2016
- Duolandrevus sulawesi (Gorochov, 2000)
- Duolandrevus sympatricus Gorochov, 2016
- Duolandrevus thailandicus (Otte, 1988)

subgenus Eulandrevus Gorochov, 1988

- Duolandrevus axinus Zhang, Liu & Shi, 2017
- Duolandrevus borneo Gorochov, 2016
- Duolandrevus coriaceus (Shiraki, 1930)
- Duolandrevus dendrophilus (Gorochov, 1988)
- Duolandrevus enatus (Gorochov, 1990)
- Duolandrevus gorochovi Zhang, Liu & Shi, 2017
- Duolandrevus guntheri (Gorochov, 1988)
- Duolandrevus hainanensis Liu, He & Ma, 2015
- Duolandrevus infuscatus Liu & Bi, 2010
- Duolandrevus ishigaki Otte, 1988
- Duolandrevus ivani (Gorochov, 1988)
- Duolandrevus kawataredoki Tan & Wahab, 2017
- Duolandrevus major Otte, 1988
- Duolandrevus megararus Gorochov, 2016
- Duolandrevus microrarus Gorochov, 2016
- Duolandrevus namlik Gorochov, 2017
- Duolandrevus paradoxus (Gorochov, 2001)
- Duolandrevus rarus Gorochov, 1996
- Duolandrevus sonorus (Gorochov, 1988)
- Duolandrevus sumatranus Gorochov, 1996
- Duolandrevus tawau Gorochov, 2016
- Duolandrevus unguiculatus Ma, Gorochov & Zhang, 2015
- Duolandrevus yaeyamensis Oshiro, 1988
- Duolandrevus yonaguniensis Ichikawa, 2001
- Duolandrevus ziyunensis Zhang, Liu & Shi, 2017

subgenus Jorama Otte, 1988 (synonym Neova Otte, 1988)

- Duolandrevus amplus Gorochov, 2005
- Duolandrevus bodemensis (Otte, 1988)
- Duolandrevus curtipennis Chopard, 1937
- Duolandrevus isagorensis (Otte, 1988)
- Duolandrevus kotoshoensis Oshiro, 1989
- Duolandrevus lombokensis Gorochov, 1996
- Duolandrevus palawanensis (Otte, 1988)
- Duolandrevus shilovi Gorochov, 1996

subgenus Platylandrevus Gorochov, 2005

- Duolandrevus depressus Gorochov, 2005

subgenus Spinolandrevus Gorochov, 2000

- Duolandrevus dohrni Gorochov, 2000

subgenus Surdolandrevus Gorochov, 2003

- Duolandrevus surdus Gorochov, 2003

subgenus Vietlandrevus Gorochov, 1996

- Duolandrevus imitator Gorochov, 2000
- Duolandrevus minimus Gorochov, 1996
- Duolandrevus sapidus (Gorochov, 1990)

subgenus not assigned

- Duolandrevus bicolor Bhowmik, 1981
- Duolandrevus fruhstorferi Gorochov, 1996
- Duolandrevus gigans Gorochov, 2016
- Duolandrevus longipennis Chopard, 1968
- Duolandrevus mjobergi Chopard, 1930
- Duolandrevus nairi Vasanth, 1991
- Duolandrevus palauensis Otte, 1988
- Duolandrevus semialatus Chopard, 1930
