= Kotama =

Scientific classification
- Kingdom: Animalia
- Phylum: Arthropoda
- Clade: Pancrustacea
- Class: Insecta
- Order: Orthoptera
- Suborder: Ensifera
- Family: Gryllidae
- Subfamily: Landrevinae
- Tribe: Landrevini
- Genus: Kotama; Otte, 1988

Genus of crickets

Kotama is a genus of crickets in the tribe Landrevini, from Malesia, erected by D. Otte in 1988.

== Species ==
The Orthoptera Species File includes:

1. Kotama incisa Gorochov, 2016 - Maluku Islands
2. Kotama maai Otte, 1988 - type species - Borneo
