= Pteroplistes =

Scientific classification
- Kingdom: Animalia
- Phylum: Arthropoda
- Class: Insecta
- Order: Orthoptera
- Suborder: Ensifera
- Family: Pteroplistidae
- Subfamily: Pteroplistinae
- Genus: Pteroplistes; Brunner von Wattenwyl, 1873

Synonyms
- Platyxiphus Walker, 1869; Pteroplistus Saussure, 1877

Genus of crickets

Pteroplistes is the type genus of the Pteroplistidae, a family of crickets: it was erected by Carl Brunner von Wattenwyl in 1873. Species have been recorded from India and western Malesia.

== Genera and Species ==
The Orthoptera Species File lists:

subgenus Eupteroplistes Gorochov, 2022

1. Pteroplistes tarbinskyi Gorochov, 2022

subgenus Pteroplistes Brunner von Wattenwyl, 1873

1. Pteroplistes acinaceus Saussure, 1877 - type species
2. Pteroplistes borneoensis Gorochov, 2004
3. Pteroplistes bruneiensis Tan, Gorochov & Wahab, 2019
4. Pteroplistes kervasae Jaiswara, 2014
5. Pteroplistes lagrecai Gorochov, 2004
6. Pteroplistes malaccanus Gorochov, 2018
7. Pteroplistes masinagudi Jaiswara, 2014
8. Pteroplistes platycleis Bolívar, 1900
9. Pteroplistes platyxiphus (Haan, 1844)
10. Pteroplistes silam Tan, Gorochov & Robillard, 2024
11. Pteroplistes sumatranus Gorochov, 2004

Note: †Pteroplistes danicus is now the unplaced †Proeneopterotrypus danicus Rust, 1999
