= Landrevinae =

Scientific classification
- Domain: Eukaryota
- Kingdom: Animalia
- Phylum: Arthropoda
- Class: Insecta
- Order: Orthoptera
- Suborder: Ensifera
- Family: Gryllidae
- Subfamily: Landrevinae; Gorochov, 1982

Subfamily of crickets

External image
- Images of Duolandrevus spp. at iNaturalist

The Landrevinae are a subfamily of crickets, in the family Gryllidae (subfamily group Gryllinae), based on the type genus Landreva. They are terrestrial, omnivorous and may be known as "bark crickets"; genera are distributed in: Central and South America, Africa, tropical Asia, Korea, Japan, Australia and the Pacific Islands.

== Tribes and genera ==
The Orthoptera Species File lists three tribes:

=== Landrevini ===
Auth. Gorochov, 1982

- Ahldreva Otte, 1988
- Ajorama Otte, 1988
- Apiotarsoides Chopard, 1931
- Avdrenia Otte, 1988
- Copholandrevus Chopard, 1925
- Drelanvus Chopard, 1930
- Duolandrevus Kirby, 1906
- Ectodrelanva Gorochov, 2000
- Eleva (insect) Otte, 1988
- Endodrelanva Gorochov, 2000
- Endolandrevus Saussure, 1877
- Fijina Otte, 1988
- Ginidra Otte, 1988
- Hemilandreva Chopard, 1936
- Jareta Otte, 1988
- Kotama Otte, 1988
- Landreva Walker, 1869
- Lasiogryllus Chopard, 1930
- Mjobergella Chopard, 1925
- Odontogryllodes Chopard, 1969
- Otteana Gorochov, 1990
- Papava (insect) Otte, 1988
- Paralandrevus Saussure, 1877
- Repapa Otte, 1988
- Sigeva Otte, 1988
- Solepa Otte, 1988
- Sulawemina Gorochov, 2016
- Vasilia Gorochov, 1988

=== Odontogryllini ===
Auth. de Mello, 1992

- Brasilodontus de Mello, 1992
- Odontogryllus Saussure, 1877
- Valchica de Mello, 1992
- Xulavuna de Mello & Campos, 2014
- Yarrubura de Mello & Campos, 2014

=== Prolandrevini ===
Auth. Gorochov, 2011

- Astriduleva Gorochov, 2016
- Creolandreva Hugel, 2009
- Gryllapterus Bolívar, 1912
- Microlandreva Chopard, 1958
- Oreolandreva Chopard, 1945
- Prolandreva Gorochov, 2005
- Striduleva Gorochov, 2016
