= Pteroplistidae =

Scientific classification
- Kingdom: Animalia
- Phylum: Arthropoda
- Class: Insecta
- Order: Orthoptera
- Suborder: Ensifera
- Superfamily: Grylloidea
- Family: Pteroplistidae
- Subfamily: Pteroplistinae; Chopard, 1936

Synonyms
- Pteroplistinae Chopard, 1936; Pteroplistini Chopard, 1936

Subfamily of crickets

External image
- Image at iNaturalist

The Pteroplistidae sometimes called "feather-winged crickets", comprise a subfamily of crickets, now placed as monotypic, with subfamily Pteroplistinae and tribe Pteroplistini Chopard, 1936. Species are found in tropical Asia.

== Genera and species ==
The Orthoptera Species File lists:

1. Asymmetriola Gorochov, 2010 - monotypic A. spinosa Gorochov, 2010
2. Changiola Gorochov, 2004
  1. Changiola pahangi Gorochov, 2011
  2. Changiola perakensis (Chopard, 1969)
  3. Changiola subita Gorochov, 2004
3. Crockeriola Gorochov & Kostia, 1999 - monotypic C. stolarczyki Gorochov & Kostia, 1999
4. Kerinciola Gorochov, 2004
  1. Kerinciola similis (Chopard, 1969)
  2. Kerinciola sonora Gorochov, 2004
  3. Kerinciola tabulophila Gorochov, 2011
5. Pangrangiola Gorochov, 2004
  1. Pangrangiola bona Gorochov, 2004
  2. Pangrangiola propria Gorochov, 2004
6. Leuseriola Gorochov, 2022 - Sumatra
7. Malaysiola Gorochov, 2022 - Peninsular Malaysia
8. Pteroplistes Brunner von Wattenwyl, 1873
9. Singapuriola Gorochov & Tan, 2012 - monotypic S. separata Gorochov & Tan, 2012
10. Tembelingiola Gorochov, 2004 - monotypic T. plana Gorochov, 2004
11. Tramlapiola Gorochov, 1990
