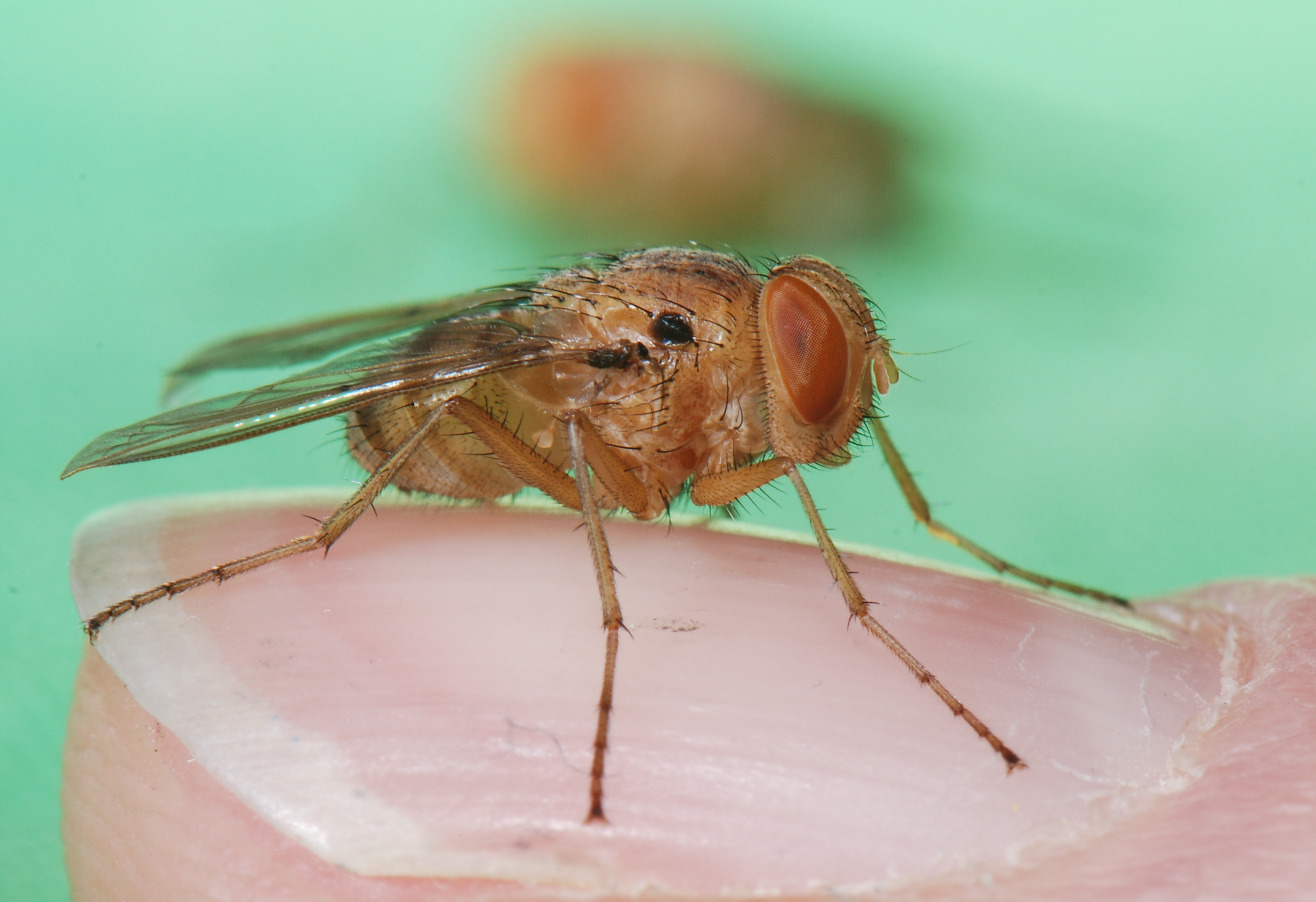

Scientific classification
- Kingdom: Animalia
- Phylum: Arthropoda
- Clade: Pancrustacea
- Class: Insecta
- Order: Diptera
- Family: Tachinidae
- Subfamily: Tachininae
- Tribe: Ormiini
- Genus: Ormia
- Species: O. ochracea

Binomial name
- Ormia ochracea (Bigot, 1889)

Synonyms
- Phasiopteryx montana Townsend, 1912; Pyrrosia ochracea Bigot, 1889

= Ormia ochracea =

Species of fly

Ormia ochracea is a small yellow nocturnal fly in the family Tachinidae. It is notable for its parasitism of crickets and its exceptionally acute directional hearing. The female is attracted to the song of the male cricket and deposits larvae on or around him, as was discovered in 1975 by the zoologist William H. Cade.

Ormia ochracea is a model organism in sound localization experiments because of its unique "ears", which are complex structures inside the fly's prothorax near the bases of its front legs. The fly is too small for the time difference of sound arriving at the two ears to be calculated in the usual way, yet it can determine the direction of sound sources with exquisite precision. The tympanic membranes of opposite ears are directly connected mechanically, allowing resolution of nanosecond time differences and requiring a new neural coding strategy. Various research groups have designed low-noise differential microphones inspired by O. ochracea’s directionally sensitive hearing system.

== Distribution ==
Ormia ochracea is native to the southeastern United States, including states such as Texas and Florida. O. ochracea is also found throughout North America, South America, and the Caribbean, though its exact range is not known.

== Life history ==
Ormia ochracea has the full life cycle of egg, larvae, pupa, and adult. Once a female fly finds a suitable host, she deposits planidia (first instar larvae) which then quickly burrow into the host. The planidia develop within the body of the field cricket host, embedding initially in muscle before migrating into the abdomen. The larvae molt within the host's abdomen and feed primarily on the host's muscle and fat. O. ochracea larvae typically complete development and emerge after about 7 days, which subsequently kills the host. The larvae pupate and emerge as adult flies approximately 2 weeks after emerging from the host.

== Food resources ==
O. ochracea is a parasitoid known to prey on several species of Gryllus field crickets including Gryllus integer, Gryllus rubens, Gryllus texensis, and Gryllus firmus. Flies have been observed responding to various cricket songs, but seem to be limited to the family Gryllidae. The natural host of the fly may vary by location. Larvae of O. ochracea exhibit highest survival in its natural host and limited survival in other potential host species.

=== Host-finding ===
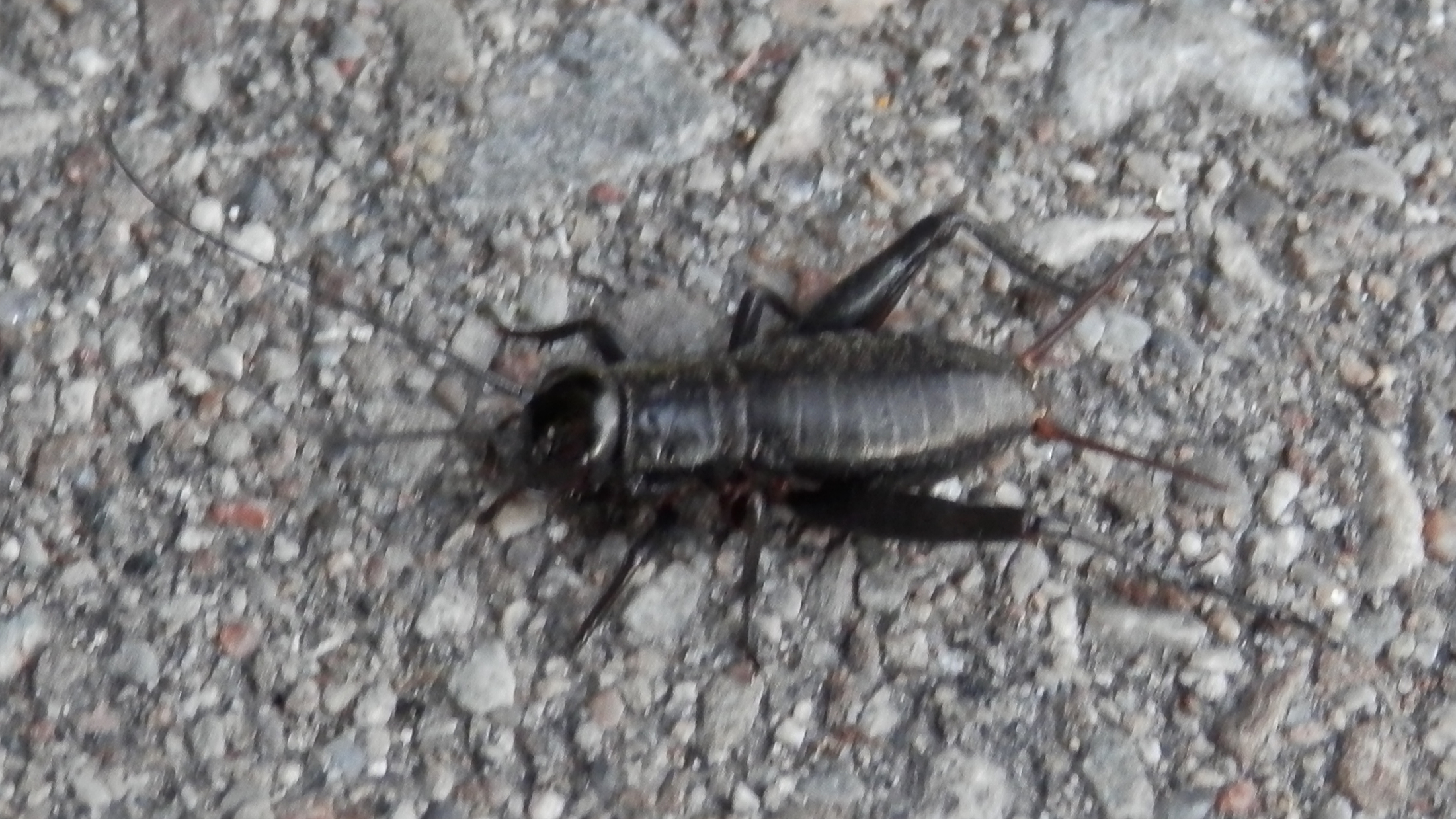
The field cricket is the common host for O. ochracea

In 1975, William H. Cade experimentally demonstrated that Ormia ochracea uses the mating call of the field cricket as a means to locate its host. Cade placed dead crickets on top of speakers playing cricket songs and various control sounds and recorded the amount of time the fly spent on either the control or test speaker. He found that flies spent more time on the speakers playing cricket songs and observed that the flies would always deposit larvae on and around the speaker which was playing cricket songs.

==== Learning ====
O. ochracea have been shown to adjust their preference for host songs after exposure to different songs in the laboratory. In a 2011 study, flies that were previously exposed to the G. lineaticeps song chose the G. lineaticeps song over the G. integer song, and vice versa. This preference was very short term. O. ochracea's flexible learning capabilities may have been critical in expanding its host and geographical range.

=== Effects of infestation on host behavior ===
O. ochracea infestation has been shown to affect the behavior and reproduction of host field crickets. Early in the infestation period, non-reproductive behavior is largely unimpaired because the parasitic larvae do not consume the digestive system or central nervous system of the host. After the larvae migrate to the host's abdomen, the host's mating, egg-laying, and fighting ability decline, most likely due to tissue damage caused by the larvae. Additionally, infestation of female crickets alters their mating preferences. Gryllus lineaticeps females normally prefer to respond to male songs with intermediate chirp rates over those with slow chirp rates, but females parasitized by O. ochracea show no preference between chirp rates. Reduced selectivity in infested female G. lineaticeps may be adaptive, as a female may be more likely to reproduce before being killed by the parasitoids if they are less selective.

=== Host defenses ===
Some species of cricket which are parasitzed by O. ochracea have evolved methods to avoid infestation. For example, some members of the prey cricket Teleogryllus oceanicus have a mutation called flat wing, in which the sound-producing structures of the male forewings are erased. The flat wing was first observed in 2003 on the Hawaiian island of Kauai, and was also found on neighbouring Oahu two years later. Genetic studies of crickets from each island show that the mutations arose from different genomic variations.

== Enemies ==
Because field crickets commonly sing at night, O. ochracea are susceptible to predation by bats. Studies have shown that O. ochracea has evolved an acoustic startle response to bat-like ultrasound, a response very similar to that of female crickets. O. ochracea has also been shown to demonstrate a sharp response boundary between the frequencies of cricket song and bat ultrasound.

== Physiology ==
=== Directional hearing ===
In order for an animal to localize sound, it must be able to detect minute differences in intensity and time between the arrival of the sound to the ear closer to the source and the ear further from the source. O. ochracea displays a remarkable ability to localize sound despite the incredibly small distance (450-520μm) between its acoustic sensory organs. Its sound localization ability is facilitated by a cuticular structure which joins its ears, mechanically coupling their motion and magnifying interaural differences by a factor of about 20. Prior to O. ochracea no similar mechanism of auditory localization had been described.

== Scientific significance ==
Several researchers have reported the construction of microphones inspired by the hearing system of O. ochracea. In 2009, R.N. Miles et al. designed and created a low-noise differential microphone inspired by the unique hearing system of O. ochracea, for use in hearing aids. The design of their microphone diaphragm, which measures 1 x 2 mm^{2}, is based on the mechanically coupled ears of O. ochracea. Their microphone was found to have lower noise than commercially available hearing aid microphones while minimizing distance between sensors. In April 2015, a group from the University of Strathclyde and the MRC/CSO Institute for Hearing Research (IHR) announced that it had created a microphone based on O. ochracea's hearing system, and had been awarded a £430,000 grant by the U.K. Engineering and Physical Sciences Research Council to build and test the hearing aid for three years.
