= Brown cricket =

This common name may refer to the following species:

- Acanthogryllus fortipes
- Gryllus assimilis
