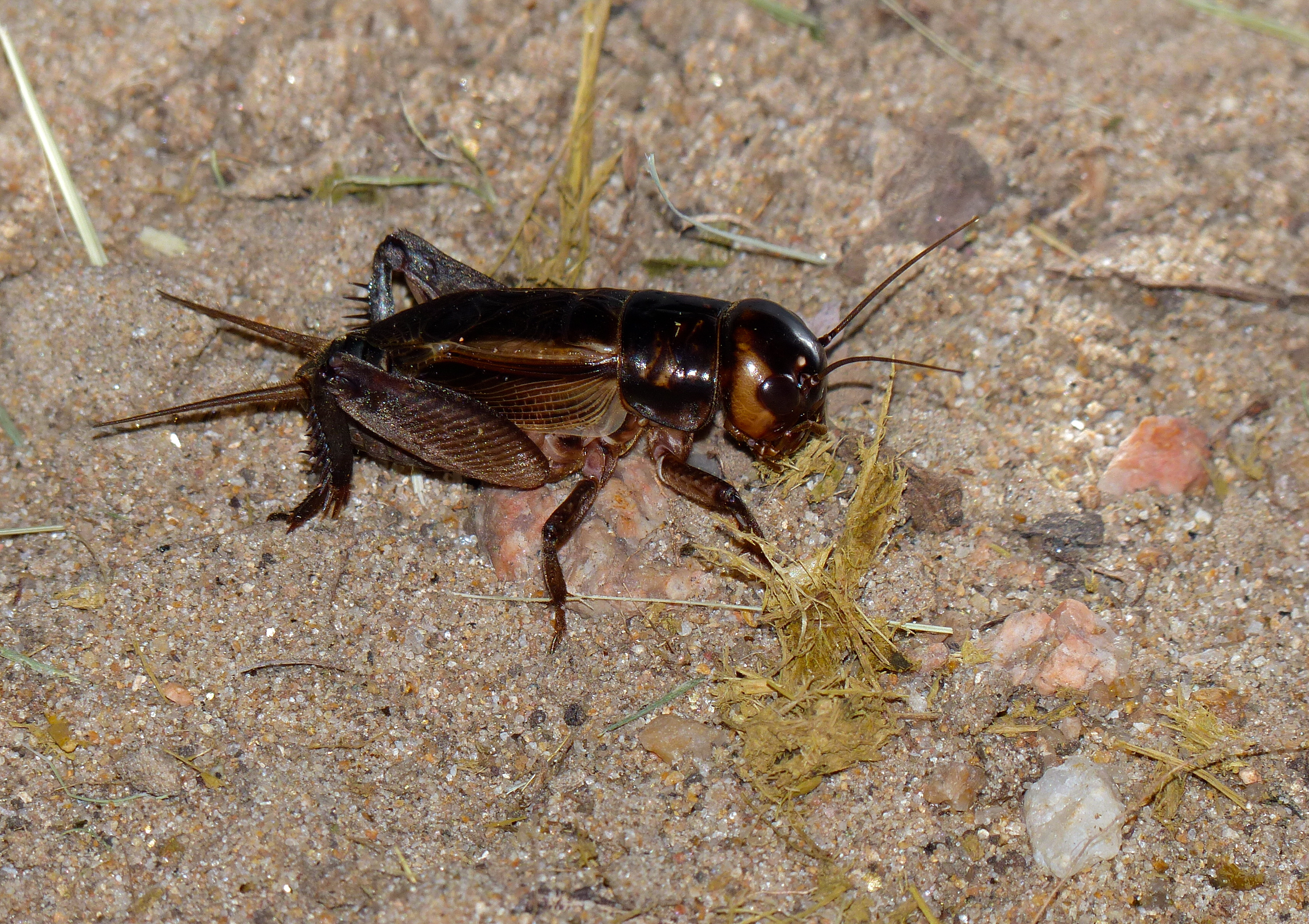
- Acanthogryllus fortipes - Tamboti Tented Camp, Kruger NP, SOUTH AFRICA

Scientific classification
- Domain: Eukaryota
- Kingdom: Animalia
- Phylum: Arthropoda
- Class: Insecta
- Order: Orthoptera
- Suborder: Ensifera
- Family: Gryllidae
- Subfamily: Gryllinae
- Tribe: Gryllini
- Genus: Acanthogryllus; Saussure, 1877

Species
- See text

= Acanthogryllus =

Genus of crickets

Acanthogryllus is a genus of cricket in family Gryllidae.

== Taxonomy ==
Genus contains the following species:

- Acanthogryllus acus Gorochov, 1988
- Acanthogryllus asiaticus Gorochov, 1990
- Acanthogryllus brunneri (Sélys-Longchamps, 1868)
- Acanthogryllus fortipes (Walker, 1869)
- Acanthogryllus malgasus Gorochov, 1988
- Acanthogryllus teretiusculus Gorochov, 1988
