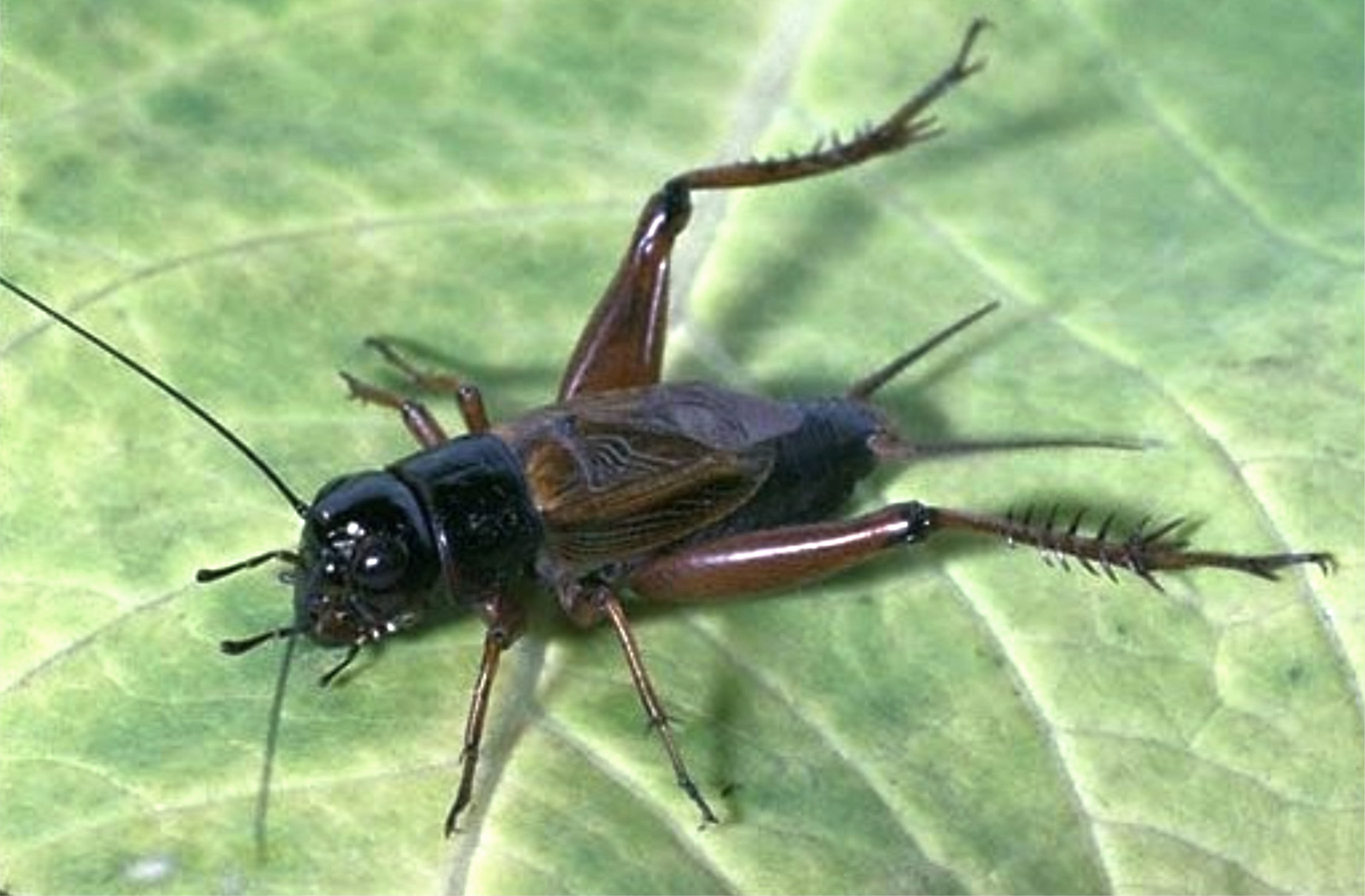
- Gryllus rubens in Alabama

Scientific classification
- Kingdom: Animalia
- Phylum: Arthropoda
- Class: Insecta
- Order: Orthoptera
- Suborder: Ensifera
- Family: Gryllidae
- Genus: Gryllus
- Species: G. rubens

Binomial name
- Gryllus rubens (Scudder, 1902)

= Gryllus rubens =

Species of cricket

Gryllus rubens, commonly known as the southeastern field cricket, is one of many cricket species known as a field cricket. It occurs throughout most of the Southeastern United States. Its northern range spans from southern Delaware to the extreme southeastern corner of Kansas, with a southern range stretching from Florida to eastern Texas.

== Description ==
=== Morphology ===
Gryllus rubens has been found to be morphologically indistinguishable from G. texensis, with which it shares its range. Compared to G. texensis, female G. rubens are found to have longer ovipositors. It has been found that G. rubens has a peripatric origin derived from one lineage of geographically subdivided ancestor of G. texensis.

==== Wing morphology ====
Many studies on G. rubens revolve around their ability to exhibit wing polymorphism. Many of which are done in northern Florida where G. rubens occurs year-round. In the spring/summer seasons, G. rubens is often found to have long wings that reach the end of their abdomen. While in the autumn/winter seasons G. rubens tend to be short winged. These results showed that the environment plays big role in determining wing morph in G. rubens. However, a later study identified that in female G. rubens, genotype plays a bigger role in determining wing morph and in males the environment plays a bigger role in determining wing morph. Thus it was concluded that genes for wing morph is strongly influenced by the environment. A few years later, a study found that short winged female G. rubens oviposit earlier and with more eggs than their long winged counterparts. It is suggested that due to the longer wings, more nutrients are being allocated to maintain the wings. Which causes long wing morphs to have smaller ovaries and produce fewer eggs. Alternatively, short winged male G. rubens have not been found to reach sexual maturity earlier nor have a difference in reproductive output compared to long winged males.

==== Digestion ====
Gryllus rubens have three major digestive enzymes: protease, amylase and lipase in their midgut and hindgut. Previously, it was believed that only midgut had the biggest contribution to breaking down food but it was discovered that the hindgut contributes just much enzymatic activity as the midgut to break down food to nutrients.

== Courtship songs ==
One of the main difference between the cryptic sister species G. rubens and G. texensisis the structure of their call courtship song. Specifically, G. rubens have more low-frequency ticks per phrase and more pulses per trill in their courtship songs.

A study in 2006 investigated female G. rubens response to conspecific courtship songs from males dependent on season. The results showed that fewer females would approach the broadcaster during the autumn, and females would spend less time near the broadcasting male during the fall.

Another study in 2011 investigated male G. rubens responses upon hearing another male make conspecific advertisement signals. It was found that younger G. rubens responded phono-tactically, while older crickets will respond acoustically. In simple terms, upon hearing the conspecific song, young crickets will move towards and approach the courtship song, possibly in attempts to steal wondering females; while older G. rubens will respond with a song of their own.

G. rubens also has occurred alongside G. firmus in portions of its range and can be difficult to differentiate. They can be distinguished by their call song and forewing color pattern. G. rubens has a slower call song than G. firmus. Its forewings also have a pale lateral field with inconspicuous veins and crossveins. G. firmus has venation that is paler than the background of the lateral field.

== Predators ==
The tachinid fly Ormia ochracea is a parasitoid of several crickets including G. rubens. This fly uses the courtship songs of G. rubens in order to locate potential hosts, as O. ochracea have been shown to be attracted to the songs of crickets. After locating the host cricket, O. ochracea females deposit larvae, which then quickly burrow into the host. The larvae develop within the host before emerging in about 7 days, killing the host.
