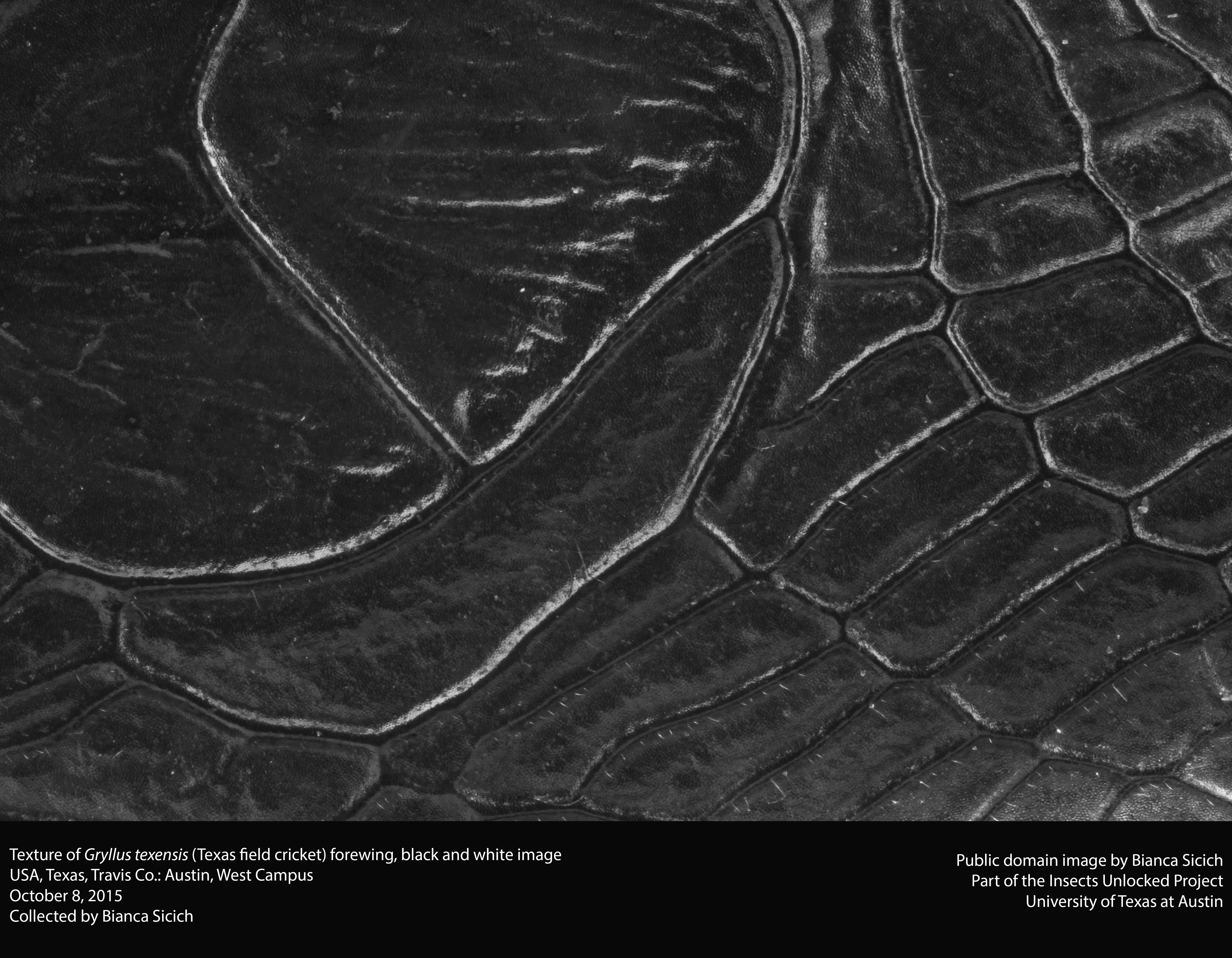

Scientific classification
- Domain: Eukaryota
- Kingdom: Animalia
- Phylum: Arthropoda
- Class: Insecta
- Order: Orthoptera
- Suborder: Ensifera
- Family: Gryllidae
- Genus: Gryllus
- Species: G. texensis

Binomial name
- Gryllus texensis Cade and Otte, 2000

= Gryllus texensis =

Species of cricket

Gryllus texensis is a species of cricket described by William H. Cade and Otte in (2000). Cade and Otte clarify that field crickets collected in the Southeastern United States from Florida to Texas identified as Gryllus integer, were in fact misidentified, and should have been classified as G. texensis. Morphologically, Cade and Otte found no differences between G. texensis and Gryllus rubens, however, their call song structure was significantly different (see Gray and Cade (1999)).
