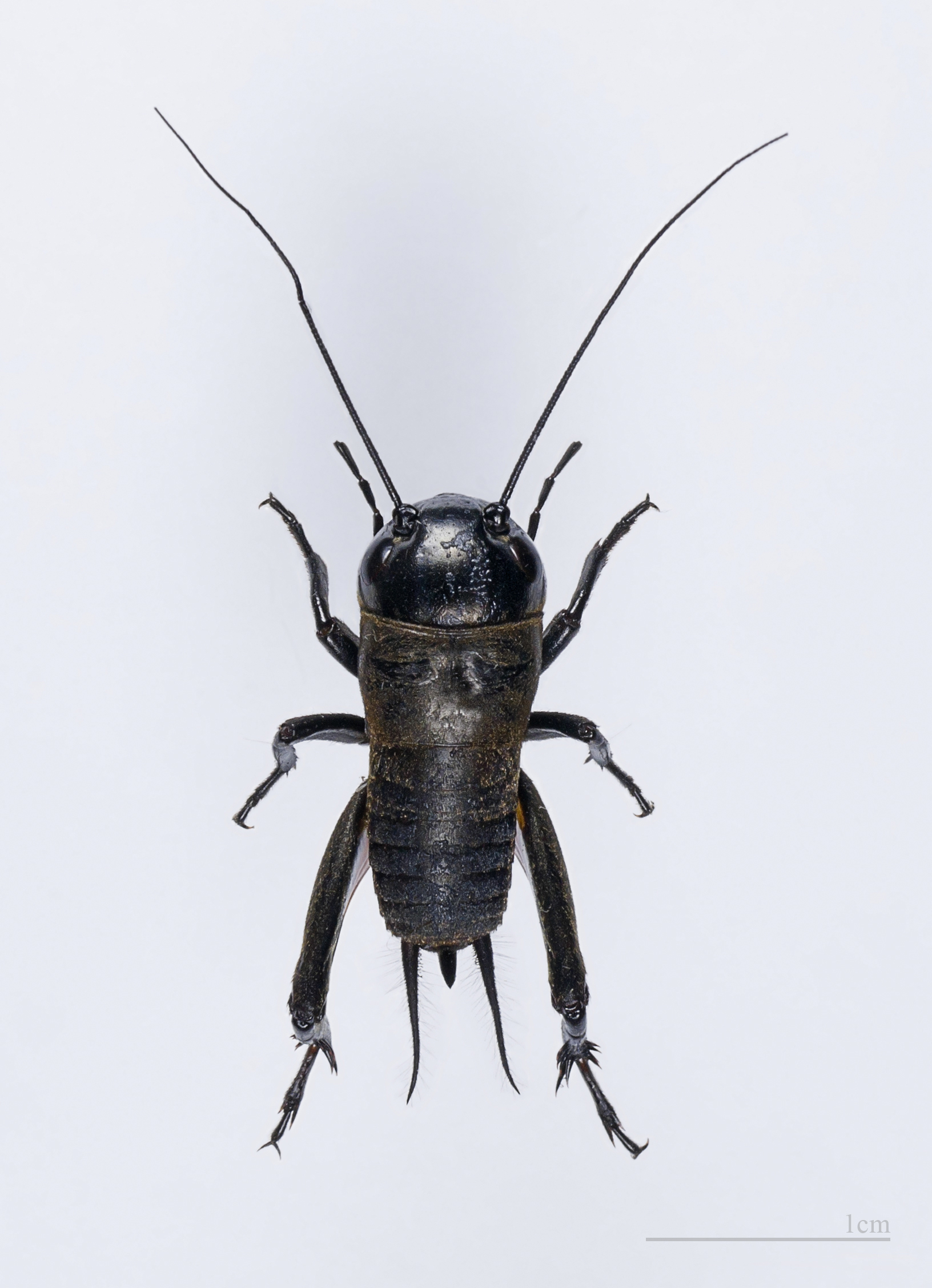
- Juvenile female Gryllus campestris

Scientific classification
- Kingdom: Animalia
- Phylum: Arthropoda
- Clade: Pancrustacea
- Class: Insecta
- Order: Orthoptera
- Suborder: Ensifera
- Infraorder: Gryllidea
- Superfamily: Grylloidea; Laicharting, 1781

Families
- See Taxonomy section

Synonyms
- Gryllides Laicharting, 1781; Paragryllidae Desutter-Grandcolas, 1987

= Cricket (insect) =

Cricket (insect) Temporal range: Triassic–Recent

Small insects of the family Gryllidae

Crickets are orthopteran insects which are related to bush crickets and, more distantly, to grasshoppers. In older literature, such as Imms, "crickets" were placed at the family level (i.e. Gryllidae), but contemporary authorities including Otte now place them in the superfamily Grylloidea. The word has been used in combination to describe more distantly related taxa in the suborder Ensifera, such as king crickets and mole crickets.

Crickets have mainly cylindrically shaped bodies, round heads, and long antennae. Behind the head is a smooth, robust pronotum. The abdomen ends in a pair of long cerci; females have a long, cylindrical ovipositor. Diagnostic features include legs with 3-segmented tarsi; as with many Orthoptera, the hind legs have enlarged femora, providing power for jumping. The front wings are adapted as tough, leathery elytra, and some crickets chirp by rubbing parts of these together. The hind wings are membranous and folded when not in use for flight; many species, however, are flightless. The largest members of the family are the bull crickets, Brachytrupes, which are up to 5 cm (2 in) long.

Crickets are distributed all around the world except at latitudes 55° or higher, with the greatest diversity being in the tropics. They occur in varied habitats from grassland, bushes, and forests to marshes, beaches, and caves. Crickets are mainly nocturnal, and are best known for the loud, persistent, chirping song of males trying to attract females, although some species are mute. The singing species have good hearing, via the tympana on the tibiae of the front legs.

Crickets often appear as characters in literature. The Talking Cricket features in Carlo Collodi's 1883 children's book, The Adventures of Pinocchio, and in films based on the book. The insect is central to Charles Dickens's 1845 The Cricket on the Hearth and George Selden's 1960 The Cricket in Times Square. Crickets are celebrated in poems by William Wordsworth, John Keats, Du Fu and Vladimir Nazor. They are kept as pets in countries from China to Europe, sometimes for cricket fighting. Crickets are efficient at converting their food into body mass, making them a candidate for food production. They are used as human food in Southeast Asia, where they are sold deep-fried in markets as snacks. They are also used to feed carnivorous pets and zoo animals. In Brazilian folklore, crickets feature as omens of various events.

== Description ==
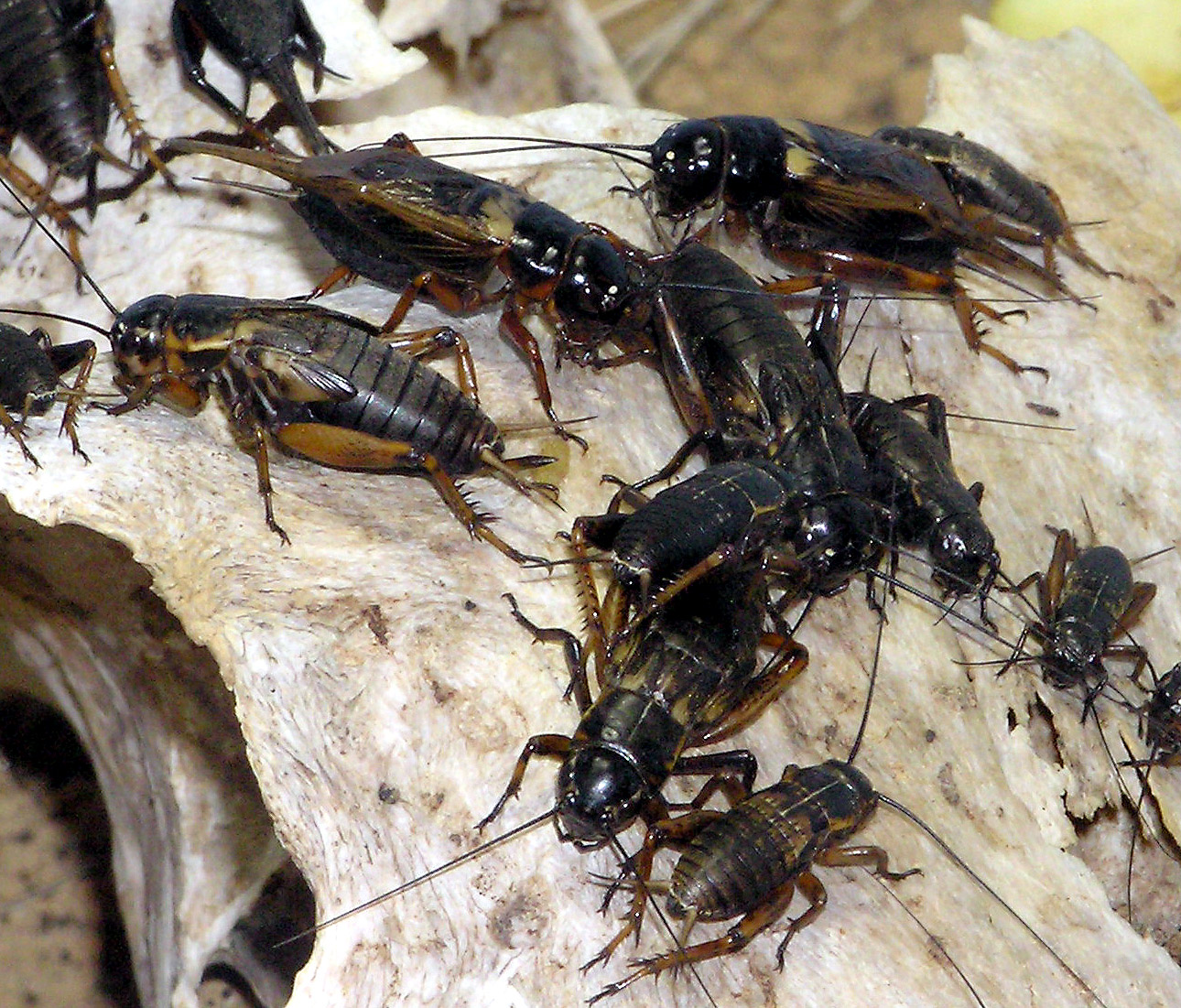
African field cricket, Gryllus bimaculatus

Crickets are small to medium-sized insects with mostly cylindrical, somewhat vertically flattened bodies. The head is spherical with long slender antennae arising from cone-shaped scapes (first segments) and just behind these are two large compound eyes. On the forehead are three ocelli (simple eyes). The pronotum (first thoracic segment) is trapezoidal in shape, robust, and well-sclerotized. It is smooth and has neither dorsal nor lateral keels (ridges).

At the tip of the abdomen is a pair of long cerci (paired appendages on rearmost segment), and in females, the ovipositor is cylindrical, long and narrow, smooth and shiny. The femora (third segments) of the back pair of legs are greatly enlarged for jumping. The tibiae (fourth segments) of the hind legs are armed with a number of moveable spurs, the arrangement of which is characteristic of each species. The tibiae of the front legs bear one or more tympani which are used for the reception of sound.

The wings lie flat on the body and are very variable in size between species, being reduced in size in some crickets and missing in others. The fore wings are elytra made of tough chitin, acting as a protective shield for the soft parts of the body and in males, bear the stridulatory organs for the production of sound. The hind pair is membranous, folding fan-wise under the fore wings. In many species, the wings are not adapted for flight.

The largest members of the family are the 5 cm (2 in)-long bull crickets (Brachytrupes) which excavate burrows a metre or more deep. The tree crickets (Oecanthinae) are delicate white or pale green insects with transparent fore wings, while the field crickets (Gryllinae) are robust brown or black insects.

== Distribution and habitat ==
Crickets have a cosmopolitan distribution, being found in all parts of the world with the exception of cold regions at latitudes higher than about 55° North and South. They have colonised many large and small islands, sometimes flying over the sea to reach these locations, or perhaps conveyed on floating timber or by human activity. The greatest diversity occurs in tropical locations, such as in Malaysia, where 88 species were heard chirping from a single location near Kuala Lumpur. A greater number than this could have been present because some species are mute.

Crickets are found in many habitats. Members of several subfamilies are found in the upper tree canopy, in bushes, and among grasses and herbs. They also occur on the ground and in caves, and some are subterranean, excavating shallow or deep burrows. Some make home in rotting wood, and certain beach-dwelling species can run and jump over the surface of water.

== Biology ==
=== Defence ===
Crickets are relatively defenceless, soft-bodied insects. Most species are nocturnal and spend the day hidden in cracks, under bark, inside curling leaves, under stones or fallen logs, in leaf litter, or in the cracks in the ground that develop in dry weather. Some excavate their own shallow holes in rotting wood or underground and fold in their antennae to conceal their presence. Some of these burrows are temporary shelters, used for a single day, but others serve as more permanent residences and places for mating and laying eggs. Crickets burrow by loosening the soil with the mandibles and then carrying it with the limbs, flicking it backwards with the hind legs or pushing it with the head.

Other defensive strategies are the use of camouflage, fleeing, and aggression. Some species have adopted colourings, shapes, and patterns that make it difficult for predators that hunt by sight to detect them. They tend to be dull shades of brown, grey, and green that blend into their background, and desert species tend to be pale. Some species can fly, but the mode of flight tends to be clumsy, so the most usual response to danger is to scuttle away to find a hiding place. While some crickets have a weak bite, a member of the Gryllacrididae or raspy crickets from Australia were found to have the strongest bite of any insect.

=== Chirping ===
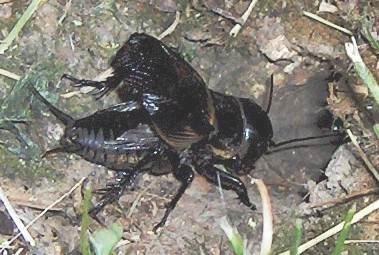
A male Gryllus cricket chirping: Its head faces its burrow; the leathery fore wings (tegmina; singular "tegmen") are raised (clear of the more delicate hind wings) and are being scraped against each other (stridulation) to produce the song. The burrow acts as a resonator, amplifying the sound.

Most male crickets make a loud chirping sound by stridulation (scraping two specially textured body parts together). The stridulatory organ is located on the tegmen, or fore wing, which is leathery in texture. A large vein runs along the centre of each tegmen, with comb-like serrations on its edge forming a file-like structure, and at the rear edge of the tegmen is a scraper. The tegmina are held at an angle to the body and rhythmically raised and lowered which causes the scraper on one wing to rasp on the file on the other. The central part of the tegmen contains the "harp", an area of thick, sclerotized membrane which resonates and amplifies the volume of sound, as does the pocket of air between the tegmina and the body wall. Most female crickets lack the necessary adaptations to stridulate, so make no sound.

Several types of cricket songs are in the repertoire of some species. The calling song attracts females and repels other males, and is fairly loud. The courting song is used when a female cricket is near and encourages her to mate with the caller. A triumphal song is produced for a brief period after a successful mating and may reinforce the mating bond to encourage the female to lay some eggs rather than find another male. An aggressive song is triggered by contact chemoreceptors on the antennae that detect the presence of another male cricket.

Crickets chirp at different rates depending on their species and the temperature of their environment. Most species chirp at higher rates the higher the temperature is (about 62 chirps a minute at 13 °C (55 °F) in one common species; each species has its own rate). The relationship between temperature and the rate of chirping is known as Dolbear's law. According to this law, counting the number of chirps produced in 14 seconds by the snowy tree cricket, common in the United States, and adding 40 will approximate the temperature in degrees Fahrenheit.

The calling song of a field cricket

In 1975, Dr. William H. Cade discovered that the parasitic tachinid fly Ormia ochracea is attracted to the song of the cricket, and uses it to locate the male to deposit her larvae on him. It was the first known example of a natural enemy that locates its host or prey using the mating signal. Since then, many species of crickets have been found to be carrying the same parasitic fly, or related species. In response to this selective pressure, a mutation leaving males unable to chirp was observed amongst a population of Teleogryllus oceanicus on the Hawaiian island of Kauai in 1999, enabling these crickets to elude their parasitoid predators. A different mutation with the same effect was also discovered on the neighboring island of Oahu (ca. 100 miles (160 km) away). Even more recently, new male wing variants (i.e., morphs) with modified wing structures of the same species in Hawaii, such as "purring" and "rattling" males, have arisen across Hawaii that produce novel auditory sexual signals that can be used to attract females while greatly reducing the likelihood of parasitoid attack from the fly.

=== Flight ===
Some species, such as the ground crickets (Nemobiinae), are wingless; others have small fore wings and no hind wings (Copholandrevus), others lack hind wings and have shortened fore wings in females only, while others are macropterous, with the hind wings longer than the fore wings. In Teleogryllus, the proportion of macropterous individuals varies from very low to 100%. Probably, most species with hind wings longer than fore wings engage in flight.

Some species, such as Gryllus assimilis, take off, fly, and land efficiently and well, while other species are clumsy fliers. In some species, the hind wings are shed, leaving wing stumps, usually after dispersal of the insect by flight. In other species, they may be pulled off and consumed by the cricket itself or by another individual, probably providing a nutritional boost.

Gryllus firmus exhibits wing polymorphism; some individuals have fully functional, long hind wings and others have short wings and cannot fly. The short-winged females have smaller flight muscles, greater ovarian development, and produce more eggs, so the polymorphism adapts the cricket for either dispersal or reproduction. In some long-winged individuals, the flight muscles deteriorate during adulthood and the insect's reproductive capabilities improve.

=== Diet ===
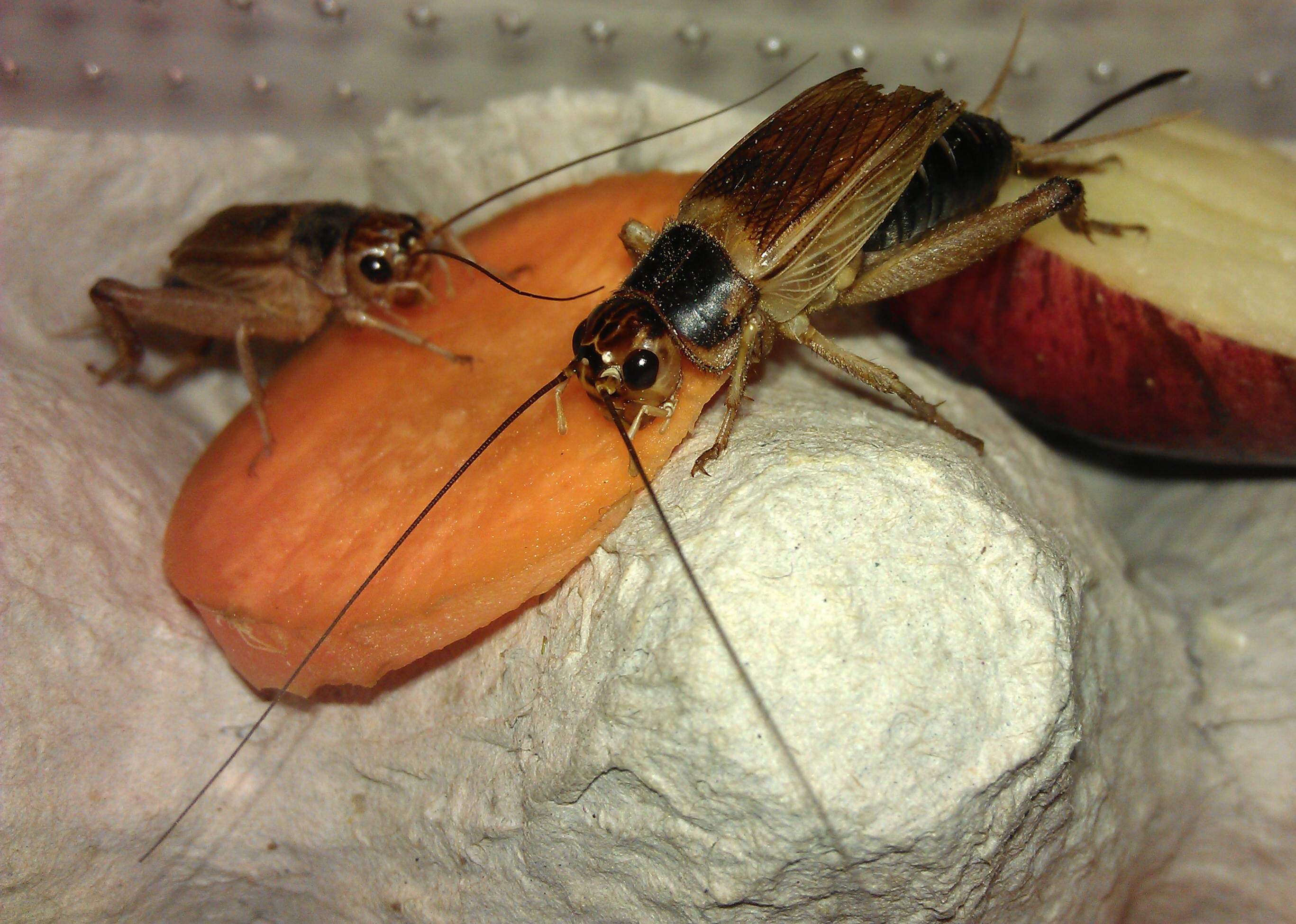
Two adult domestic crickets, Acheta domesticus, feeding on carrot

Captive crickets are omnivorous; when deprived of their natural diet, they accept a wide range of organic foodstuffs. Some species are completely herbivorous, feeding on flowers, fruit, and leaves, with ground-based species consuming seedlings, grasses, pieces of leaf, and the shoots of young plants. Others are more predatory and include in their diet invertebrate eggs, larvae, pupae, moulting insects, scale insects, and aphids. Many are scavengers and consume various organic remains, decaying plants, seedlings, and fungi. In captivity, many species have been successfully raised on a diet of ground, commercial dry dog food, supplemented with lettuce and aphids.

Crickets have relatively powerful jaws, and several species have been known to bite humans.

=== Reproduction and lifecycle ===
Male crickets establish their dominance over each other by aggression. They start by lashing each other with their antennae and flaring their mandibles. Unless one retreats at this stage, they resort to grappling, at the same time each emitting calls that are quite unlike those uttered in other circumstances. When one achieves dominance, it sings loudly, while the loser remains silent.

Females are generally attracted to males by their calls, though in nonstridulatory species, some other mechanism must be involved. After the pair has made antennal contact, a courtship period may occur during which the character of the call changes. The female mounts the male and a single spermatophore is transferred to the external genitalia of the female. Sperm flows from this into the female's oviduct over a period of a few minutes or up to an hour, depending on species. After copulation, the female may remove or eat the spermatophore; males may attempt to prevent this with various ritualised behaviours. The female may mate on several occasions with different males.

Various instars of Gryllus assimilis, by Robert Evans Snodgrass, 1930

Most crickets lay their eggs in the soil or inside the stems of plants, and to do this, female crickets have a long, needle-like or sabre-like egg-laying organ called an ovipositor. Some ground-dwelling species have dispensed with this, either depositing their eggs in an underground chamber or pushing them into the wall of a burrow. The short-tailed cricket (Anurogryllus) excavates a burrow with chambers and a defecating area, lays its eggs in a pile on a chamber floor, and after the eggs have hatched, feeds the juveniles for about a month.

Crickets are hemimetabolic insects, whose lifecycle consists of an egg stage, a larval or nymph stage that increasingly resembles the adult form as the nymph grows, and an adult stage. The egg hatches into a nymph about the size of a fruit fly. This passes through about 10 larval stages, and with each successive moult, it becomes more like an adult. After the final moult, the genitalia and wings are fully developed, but a period of maturation is needed before the cricket is ready to breed.

=== Inbreeding avoidance ===
Some species of cricket are polyandrous. In Gryllus bimaculatus, the females select and mate with multiple viable sperm donors, preferring novel mates. Female Teleogryllus oceanicus crickets from natural populations similarly mate and store sperm from multiple males. Female crickets exert a postcopulatory fertilization bias in favour of unrelated males to avoid the genetic consequences of inbreeding. Fertilization bias depends on the control of sperm transport to the sperm storage organs. The inhibition of sperm storage by female crickets can act as a form of cryptic female choice to avoid the severe negative effects of inbreeding. Controlled-breeding experiments with the cricket Gryllus firmus demonstrated inbreeding depression, as nymphal weight and early fecundity declined substantially over the generations; this was caused as expected by an increased frequency of homozygous combinations of deleterious recessive alleles.

=== Predators, parasites, and pathogens ===
Crickets have many natural enemies and are subject to various pathogens and parasites. They are eaten by large numbers of vertebrate and invertebrate predators and their hard parts are often found during the examination of animal intestines. Mediterranean house geckos (Hemidactylus turcicus) have learned that although a calling decorated cricket (Gryllodes supplicans) may be safely positioned in an out-of-reach burrow, female crickets attracted to the call can be intercepted and eaten.

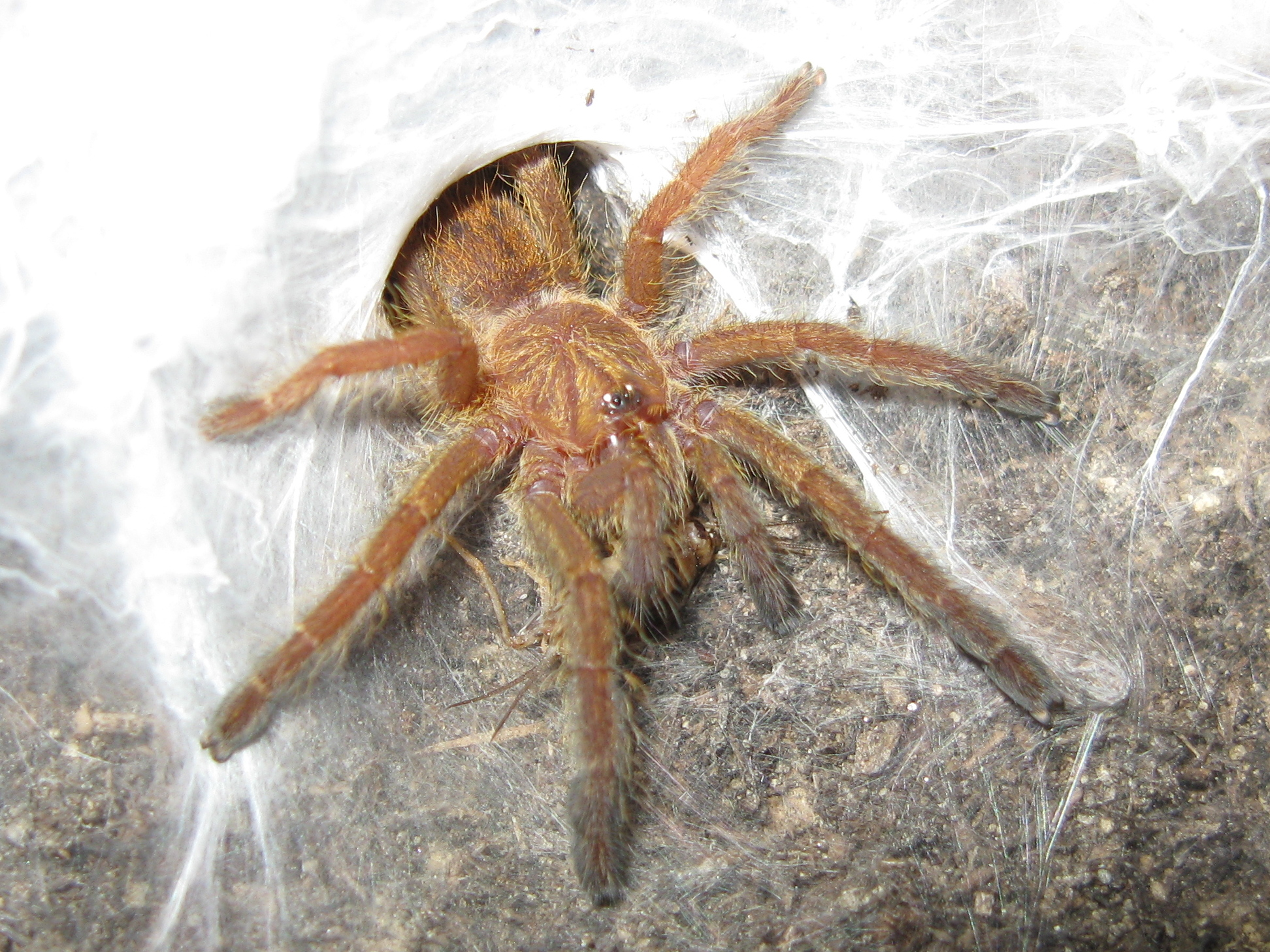
Crickets are reared as food for pets and zoo animals like this baboon spider, Pterinochilus murinus, emerging from its den to feed.

The entomopathogenic fungus Metarhizium anisopliae attacks and kills crickets and has been used as the basis of control in pest populations. The insects are also affected by the cricket paralysis virus, which has caused high levels of fatalities in cricket-rearing facilities. Other fatal diseases that have been identified in mass-rearing establishments include Rickettsia and three further viruses. The diseases may spread more rapidly if the crickets become cannibalistic and eat the corpses.

Red parasitic mites sometimes attach themselves to the dorsal region of crickets and may greatly affect them. The horsehair worm Paragordius varius is an internal parasite and can control the behaviour of its cricket host and cause it to enter water, where the parasite continues its lifecycle and the cricket likely drowns. The larvae of the sarcophagid fly Sarcophaga kellyi develop inside the body cavity of field crickets. Female parasitic wasps of Rhopalosoma lay their eggs on crickets, and their developing larvae gradually devour their hosts. Other wasps in the family Scelionidae are egg parasitoids, seeking out batches of eggs laid by crickets in plant tissues in which to insert their eggs.

The fly Ormia ochracea has very acute hearing and targets calling male crickets. It locates its prey by ear and then lays its eggs nearby. The developing larvae burrow inside any crickets with which they come in contact and in the course of a week or so, devour what remains of the host before pupating. In Florida, the parasitic flies were only present in the autumn, and at that time of year, the males sang less but for longer periods. A trade-off exists for the male between attracting females and being parasitized.

== Phylogeny and taxonomy ==
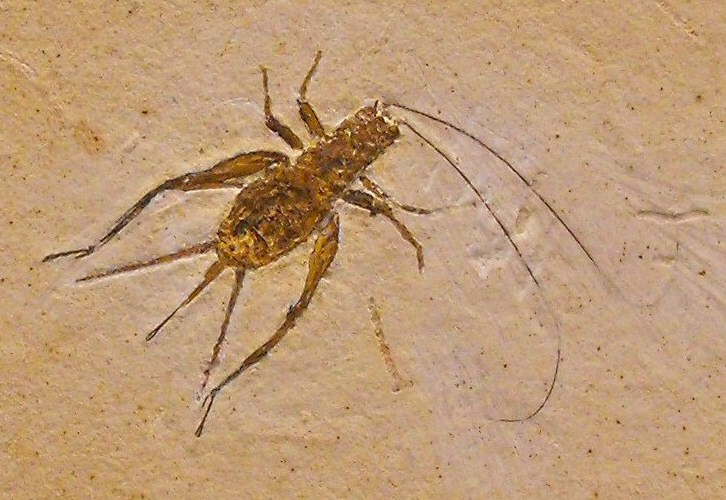
Cretaceous fossil cricket from Brazil

The phylogenetic relationships of the Gryllidae, summarized by Darryl Gwynne in 1995 from his own work (using mainly anatomical characteristics) and that of earlier authors, (Note: Gwynne cites Ander 1939, Zeuner 1939, Judd 1947, Key 1970, Ragge 1977 and Rentz 1991 as supporting the two-part scheme (Ensifera, Caelifera) in his 1995 paper.) are shown in the following cladogram, with the Orthoptera divided into two main groups, Ensifera (crickets sensu lato) and Caelifera (grasshoppers). Fossil Ensifera are found from the late Carboniferous period (300 Mya) onwards, and the true crickets, Gryllidae, from the Triassic period (250 to 200 Mya).

Cladogram after Gwynne, 1995:

- Orthoptera
  - Ensifera
    - - Grylloidea
        - Gryllidae (true crickets)
        - mole, scaly and ant crickets
      - Schizodactylidae (splay-footed crickets)
    - Tettigonioidea (katydids, bush crickets, weta)
  - Caelifera
    (shorthorned grasshoppers, pygmy mole crickets)

A phylogenetic study by Jost & Shaw in 2006 using sequences from 18S, 28S, and 16S rRNA supported the monophyly of Ensifera. Most ensiferan families were also found to be monophyletic, and the superfamily Gryllacridoidea was found to include Stenopelmatidae, Anostostomatidae, Gryllacrididae and Lezina. Schizodactylidae and Grylloidea were shown to be sister taxa, and Rhaphidophoridae and Tettigoniidae were found to be more closely related to Grylloidea than had previously been thought. The authors stated that "a high degree of conflict exists between the molecular and morphological data, possibly indicating that much homoplasy is present in Ensifera, particularly in acoustic structures." They considered that tegmen stridulation and tibial tympanae are ancestral to Ensifera and have been lost on multiple occasions, especially within the Gryllidae.

=== "Cricket" families ===
Several families and other taxa in the Ensifera may be called "crickets", including:

Within the Grylloidea

- Gryllidae – "true crickets";
- Mogoplistidae – scaly crickets;
- Oecanthidae – tree crickets, anomalous crickets
- Phalangopsidae – "spider crickets" and allies
- †Protogryllidae – an extinct family
- Pteroplistidae – "feather-winged crickets" of tropical Asia
- Trigonidiidae – sword-tail crickets and wood or ground-crickets;
- other families in the infraorder Gryllidea previously have been included:
  - Gryllotalpidae – mole crickets;
  - Myrmecophilidae – ant crickets.

Strictly, taxa in Infraorder Tettigoniidea and other superfamilies are excluded

- Tettigoniidae – the bush crickets or katydids – which are quite distinct and unrelated, with 4-segmented tarsi (at least in the middle and hind legs) and females with flattened ovipositors. Also note:
  - within this family is the genus Anabrus – the "mormon crickets";
  - "bush crickets" (American usage) include members of the subfamily Trigonidiinae – which are "true crickets".
- Superfamily Stenopelmatoidea – includes: king crickets (wētā), leaf-rolling, Jerusalem or sand crickets;
- Superfamily Rhaphidophoroidea – cave or camel crickets;
- Superfamily Schizodactyloidea – dune or splay-footed crickets.

== In human culture ==
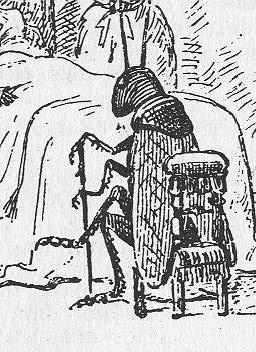
Il Grillo Parlante (The Talking Cricket) illustrated by Enrico Mazzanti for Carlo Collodi's 1883 children's book "Le avventure di Pinocchio" (The Adventures of Pinocchio)

=== Folklore and myth ===
The folklore and mythology surrounding crickets is extensive. The singing of crickets in the folklore of Brazil and elsewhere is sometimes taken to be a sign of impending rain, or of a financial windfall. In Álvar Núñez Cabeza de Vaca's chronicles of the Spanish conquest of the Americas, the sudden chirping of a cricket heralded the sighting of land for his crew, just as their water supply had run out. In Caraguatatuba, Brazil, a black cricket in a room is said to portend illness; a grey one, money; and a green one, hope. In Alagoas state, northeast Brazil, a cricket announces death, thus it is killed if it chirps in a house. In Barbados, a loud cricket means money is coming in; hence, a cricket must not be killed or evicted if it chirps inside a house. However, another type of cricket that is less noisy forebodes illness or death.

=== In literature ===
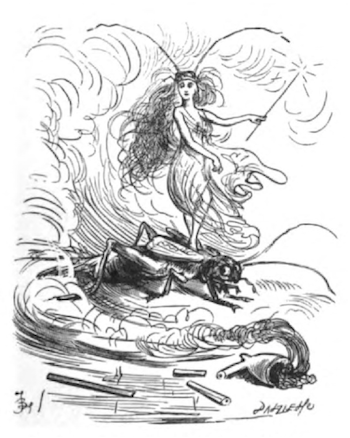
Illustration for Charles Dickens's 1883 Cricket on the Hearth by Fred Barnard

Crickets feature as major characters in novels and children's books. Charles Dickens's 1845 novella The Cricket on the Hearth, divided into sections called "Chirps", tells the story of a cricket which chirps on the hearth and acts as a guardian angel to a family. Carlo Collodi's 1883 children's book "Le avventure di Pinocchio" (The Adventures of Pinocchio) featured "Il Grillo Parlante" (The Talking Cricket) as one of its characters. George Selden's 1960 children's book The Cricket in Times Square tells the story of Chester the cricket from Connecticut who joins a family and their other animals, and is taken to see Times Square in New York. The story, which won the Newbery Honor, came to Selden on hearing a real cricket chirp in Times Square.

Souvenirs entomologiques, a book written by the French entomologist Jean-Henri Fabre, devotes a whole chapter to the cricket, discussing its construction of a burrow and its song-making. The account is mainly of the field cricket, but also mentions the Italian cricket.

Crickets have from time to time appeared in poetry. William Wordsworth's 1805 poem The Cottager to Her Infant includes the couplet "The kitten sleeps upon the hearth, The crickets long have ceased their mirth". John Keats's 1819 poem Ode to Autumn includes the lines "Hedge-crickets sing; and now with treble soft / The redbreast whistles from a garden-croft". The Chinese Tang dynasty poet Du Fu (712–770) wrote a poem that in the translation by J. P. Seaton begins "House cricket ... Trifling thing. And yet how his mournful song moves us. Out in the grass his cry was a tremble, But now, he trills beneath our bed, to share his sorrow."

=== As pets and fighting animals ===
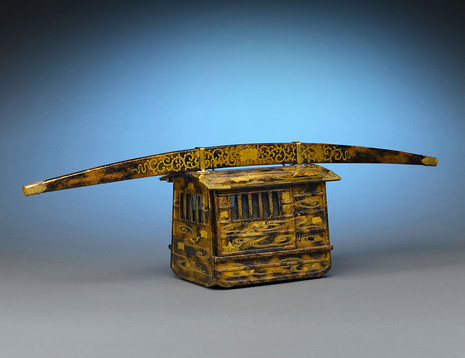
Meiji period cricket holder in the form of a norimono palanquin, c. 1850

Crickets are kept as pets and are considered good luck in some countries; in China, they are sometimes kept in cages or in hollowed-out gourds specially created in novel shapes. The practice was common in Japan for thousands of years; it peaked in the 19th century, though crickets are still sold at pet shops. It is also common to have them as caged pets in some European countries, particularly in the Iberian Peninsula. Cricket fighting is a traditional Chinese pastime that dates back to the Tang dynasty (618–907). Originally an indulgence of emperors, cricket fighting later became popular among commoners. The dominance and fighting ability of males does not depend on strength alone; it has been found that they become more aggressive after certain pre-fight experiences such as isolation, or when defending a refuge. Crickets forced to fly for a short while will afterwards fight for two to three times longer than they otherwise would.

=== As food ===
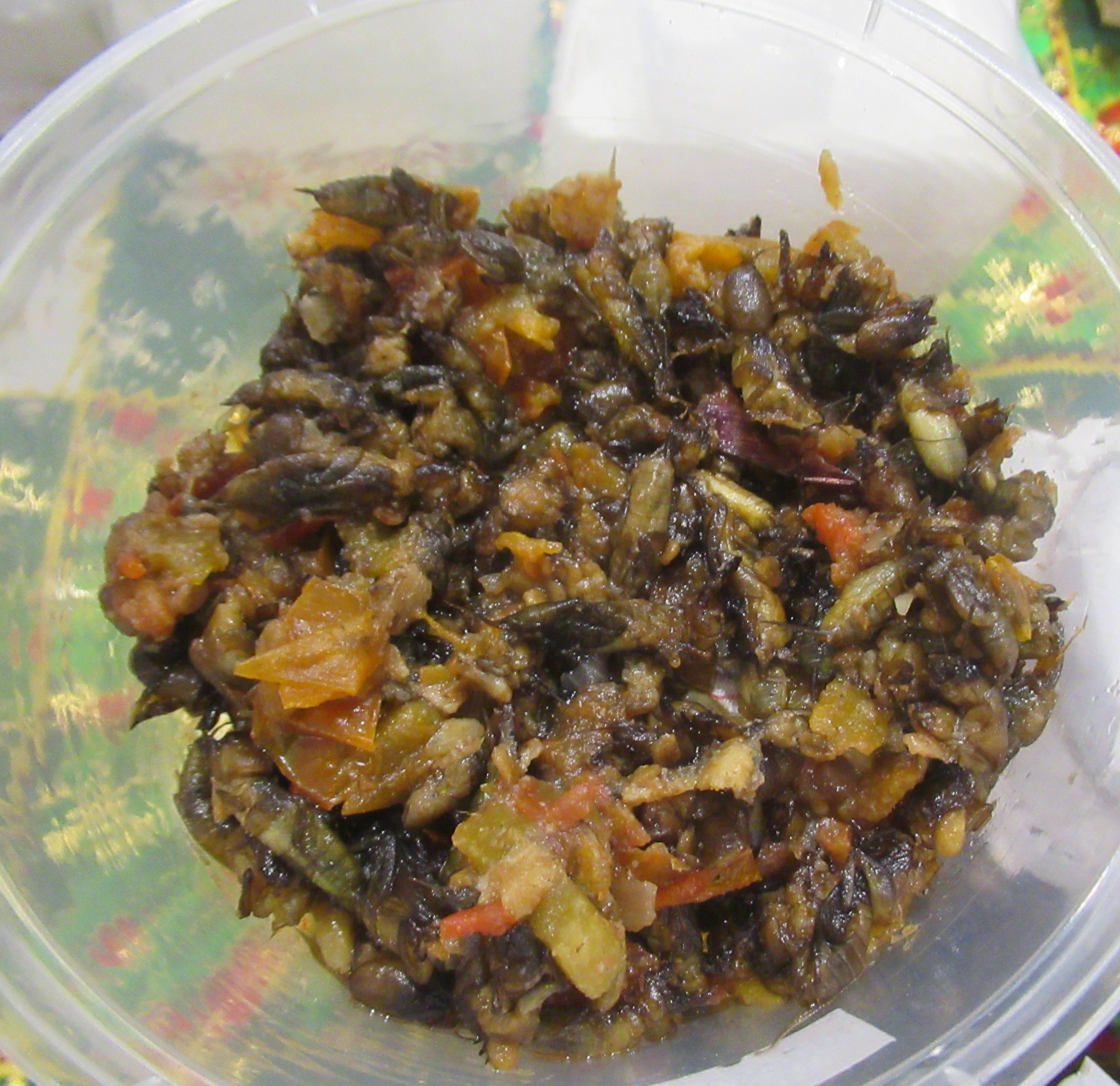
Adobong kamaru (de grillos cebolleros)

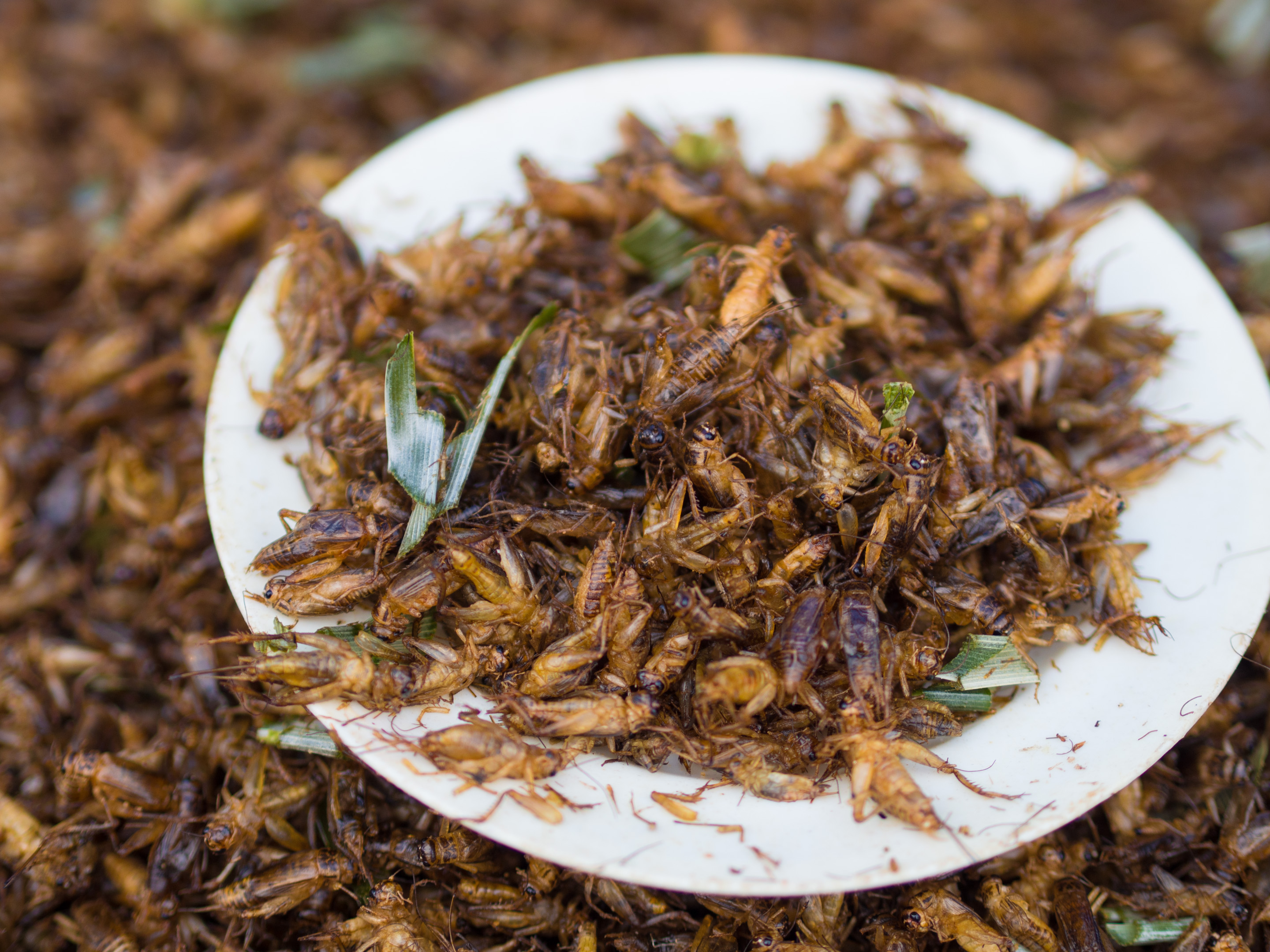
Deep-fried house crickets (Acheta domesticus) at a market in Thailand

In the southern part of Asia, including Cambodia, Laos, and Thailand, crickets commonly are eaten as a snack, prepared by deep frying soaked and cleaned insects. In Thailand, there are 20,000 farmers rearing crickets, with an estimated production of 7,500 tons per year. The United Nations' Food and Agriculture Organization has implemented a project in Laos to improve cricket farming and, consequently, food security. The food conversion efficiency of house crickets (Acheta domesticus) is 1.7, some five times higher than that for beef cattle, and if their fecundity is taken into account, 15 to 20 times higher.

Cricket flour may be used as an additive to consumer foods such as pasta, bread, crackers, and cookies. Cricket flour is used in protein bars, pet foods, livestock feed, nutraceuticals, and other industrial applications. The United Nations says that the use of insect protein, such as cricket flour, could be critical in feeding the growing population of the planet while being less damaging to the environment.

Crickets are also raised as food for carnivorous zoo animals, laboratory animals, and pets. They may be "gut loaded" with additional minerals, such as calcium, to provide a balanced diet for predators such as tree frogs (Hylidae).

=== Common expressions ===
By the 19th century "cricket" and "crickets" were in use as euphemisms for using Christ as an interjection. The addition of "Jiminy" (a variation of "Gemini"), sometimes shortened to "Jimmy" created the expressions "Jiminy Cricket!" or "Jimmy Crickets!" as less blasphemous alternatives to exclaiming "Jesus Christ!"

By the end of the 20th century the sound of chirping crickets came to represent quietude in literature, theatre and film. From this sentiment arose expressions equating "crickets" with silence altogether, particularly when a group of assembled people makes no noise. These expressions have grown from the more descriptive, "so quiet that you can hear crickets," to simply saying, "crickets" as shorthand for "complete silence."

=== In popular culture ===
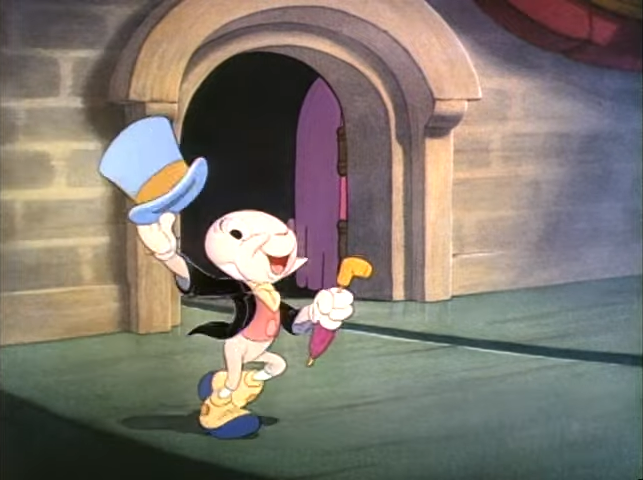
Jiminy Cricket, from Walt Disney's movie Pinocchio (1940)

Cricket characters feature in the Walt Disney animated movies Pinocchio (1940), where Jiminy Cricket becomes the title character's conscience, and in Mulan (1998), where Cri-Kee is carried in a cage as a symbol of luck, in the Asian manner. The Crickets was the name of Buddy Holly's rock and roll band; Holly's home town baseball team in the 1990s was called the Lubbock Crickets. Cricket is the name of a US children's literary magazine founded in 1973; it uses a cast of insect characters.
