= Exoristoides johnsoni =

Scientific classification
- Kingdom: Animalia
- Phylum: Arthropoda
- Class: Insecta
- Order: Diptera
- Family: Tachinidae
- Subfamily: Tachininae
- Tribe: Polideini
- Genus: Exoristoides
- Species: E. johnsoni

Binomial name
- Exoristoides johnsoni Coquillett, 1897

Species of fly

Exoristoides johnsoni is a species of bristle fly in the family Tachinidae. It is a parasitoid of Gryllus integer, and other Gryllidae.

== Distribution ==
The species is found in Canada, the United States, and Mexico.
