= Exoristoides sabroskyi =

Scientific classification
- Kingdom: Animalia
- Phylum: Arthropoda
- Clade: Pancrustacea
- Class: Insecta
- Order: Diptera
- Family: Tachinidae
- Subfamily: Tachininae
- Tribe: Polideini
- Genus: Exoristoides
- Species: E. sabroskyi

Binomial name
- Exoristoides sabroskyi O'Hara, 2002

Species of fly

Exoristoides sabroskyi is a species of bristle fly in the family Tachinidae.

== Distribution ==
The species can be found in the United States.
