= Gryllus firmus =

Scientific classification
- Domain: Eukaryota
- Kingdom: Animalia
- Phylum: Arthropoda
- Class: Insecta
- Order: Orthoptera
- Suborder: Ensifera
- Family: Gryllidae
- Genus: Gryllus
- Species: G. firmus

Binomial name
- Gryllus firmus Scudder, 1902

Species of cricket

Gryllus firmus, commonly known as the sand field cricket, is a species of cricket in the subfamily Gryllinae. It is found in the southeastern United States.

== Description ==
Gryllus firmus is very similar in appearance to other crickets found in the southeastern United States, the southeastern field cricket (Gryllus rubens) and the Texas field cricket (Gryllus texensis). It has a black head and prothorax, and a brown abdomen. It can be distinguished from these two species by the coloration and venation of the forewing, but more particularly, by its call. Males of this species chirp while males of the other two species trill.

== Distribution and habitat ==
Gryllus firmus occurs in the coastal plain of the southeastern United States. Its range extends from Connecticut and New Hampshire to Florida and Texas. The long winged morph is migratory. It is replaced to the north and west of its range by the fall field cricket (Gryllus pennsylvanicus), and the two species hybridise to a limited extent where their ranges overlap. Its typical habitat is grassland, pasture, roadside verges and lawns on light, free-draining sandy soils.

== Biology ==
Gryllus firmus exhibits wing polymorphism; some individuals have fully functional, long hind wings and others have short wings and cannot fly. Females of the latter morph have smaller flight muscles, greater ovarian development and produce more eggs, so the polymorphism adapts the cricket for either dispersal or reproduction. In some long-winged individuals, the flight muscles deteriorate during adulthood and the insect's reproductive capabilities improve.

G. firmus is unusual among field crickets in laying a mixture of two types of egg. Some eggs develop immediately and take two to four weeks to hatch, while others have a diapause, with delayed hatching taking place after from five to twenty-eight weeks. Individual females lay both egg types, with the proportion of the quick-developing types varying from 50% to 95%. Researchers hypothesize that this reproductive strategy is particularly appropriate for G. firmus because of the variability in the temperature and the soil moisture content in the sandy, fast-drying soils in which it lives. Unpredictable droughts are less likely to cause population collapses when the risk is spread in this way.
