= Exoristoides homoeonychioides =

Scientific classification
- Kingdom: Animalia
- Phylum: Arthropoda
- Clade: Pancrustacea
- Class: Insecta
- Order: Diptera
- Family: Tachinidae
- Subfamily: Tachininae
- Tribe: Polideini
- Genus: Exoristoides
- Species: E. homoeonychioides

Binomial name
- Exoristoides homoeonychioides (Townsend, 1934)

Synonyms
- Heliolydella homoeonychioides Townsend, 1934

Species of fly

Exoristoides homoeonychioides is a species of tachinid flies in the genus Exoristoides of the family Tachinidae.

== Distribution ==
The species can be found in Brazil.
