= Exoristoides =

Scientific classification
- Kingdom: Animalia
- Phylum: Arthropoda
- Class: Insecta
- Order: Diptera
- Family: Tachinidae
- Subfamily: Tachininae
- Tribe: Polideini
- Genus: Exoristoides; Coquillett, 1897

Type species
- Exoristoides johnsoni Coquillett, 1897

Synonyms
- Myersimyia Townsend, 1935; Heliolydella Townsend, 1934; Heliolydellops Townsend, 1934

Genus of flies

Exoristoides is a genus of flies in the family Tachinidae.

== Species ==
- Exoristoides blattarius O'Hara, 2002
- Exoristoides homoeonychioides (Townsend, 1934)
- Exoristoides johnsoni Coquillett, 1897
- Exoristoides mixta (Townsend, 1935)
- Exoristoides sabroskyi O'Hara, 2002
