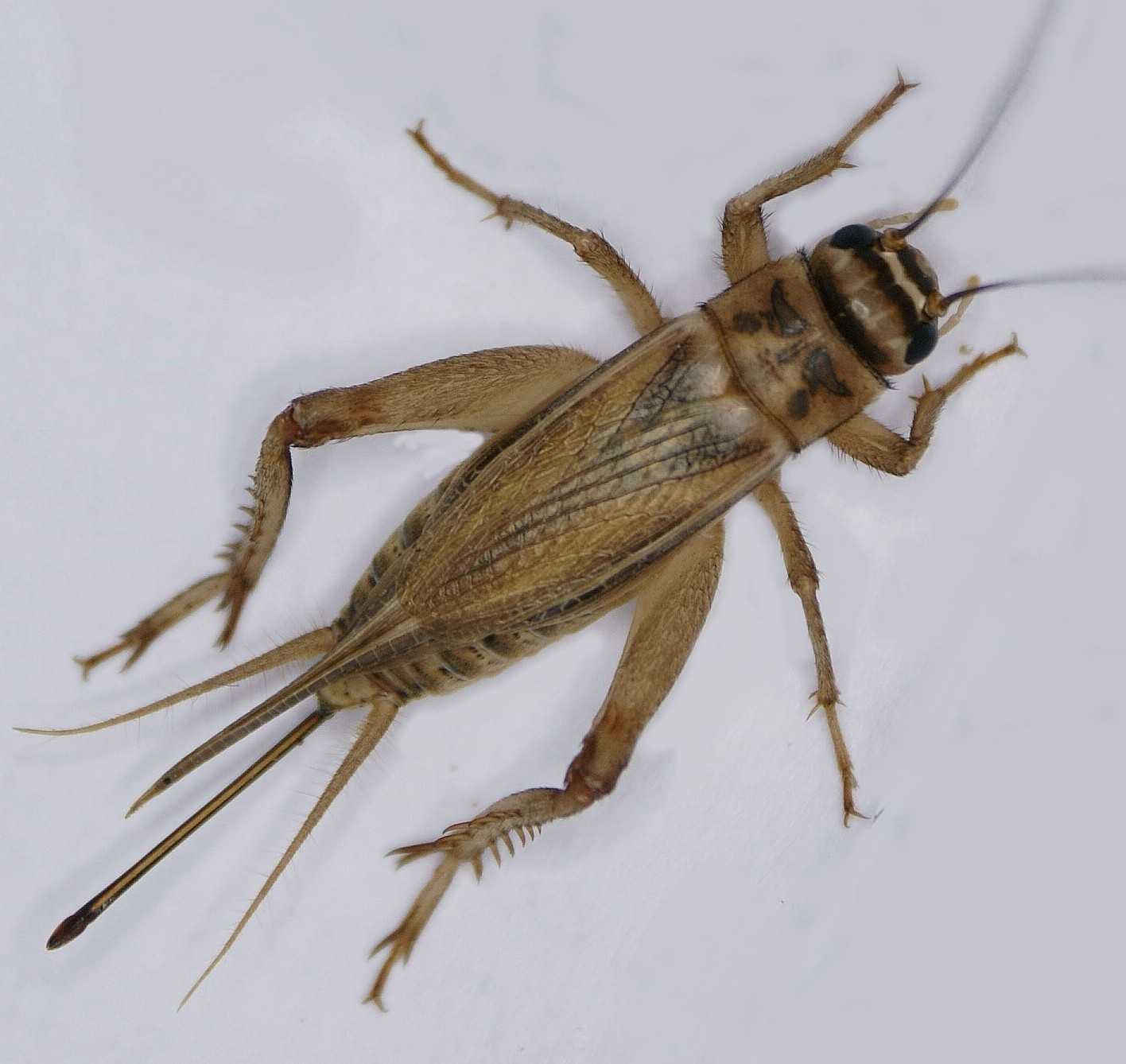

Scientific classification
- Kingdom: Animalia
- Phylum: Arthropoda
- Clade: Pancrustacea
- Class: Insecta
- Order: Orthoptera
- Suborder: Ensifera
- Family: Gryllidae
- Genus: Acheta
- Species: A. domesticus

Binomial name
- Acheta domesticus (Linnaeus, 1758)

Synonyms
- Gryllus domesticus

Audio
- Chirp

= House cricket =

Species of cricket

Close-up video of a house cricket

Acheta domesticus, commonly called the house cricket, is a species of cricket most likely native to Southwestern Asia, but between 1950 and 2000 it became the standard feeder insect for the pet and research industries and spread worldwide. They can be kept as pets themselves, as this has been the case in China and Japan.

== Description ==
The house cricket is typically gray or brownish in color, growing to 16–21 millimetres (0.63–0.83 in) in length. Males and females look similar, but females will have a brown-black, needle-like ovipositor extending from the center rear, approximately the same length as the cerci, the paired appendages towards the rear-most segment of the cricket. On males, the cerci are more prominent.

== Diet ==
The house cricket is an omnivore that eats a range of plant and animal matter. Crickets in the wild consume flowers, leaves, fruits, grasses and other insects (including dead members of their own species). Crickets in captivity will accept fruits (e.g. apples, oranges, bananas), vegetables (e.g. potatoes, carrots, squash, leafy vegetables), grains (e.g. oatmeal, cornmeal, cooked corncobs, alfalfa, wheat germ, rice cereal), various pet foods and commercial cricket food.

== Life cycle ==
House crickets take two to three months to complete their life cycle at 26 to 32 °C (79 to 90 °F). They have no special overwintering stage, but can survive cold weather in and around buildings, and in dumps where heat from fermentation may sustain them. Eggs are deposited in whatever moist substrate is available. Juveniles resemble the adults except for being smaller and wingless.

== Diseases ==
The house cricket was essentially eliminated from the cricket-breeding industries of North America and Europe by the appearance of cricket paralysis virus which spread rapidly in Europe in 2002 and then in the United States in 2010. The virus is extremely lethal to this species of cricket and a few others, and left many hobbyists and researchers without adequate feeder insects. It has been replaced by the Jamaican field cricket, which is resistant to cricket paralysis virus and has many of the desirable features of the house cricket.

== As food ==
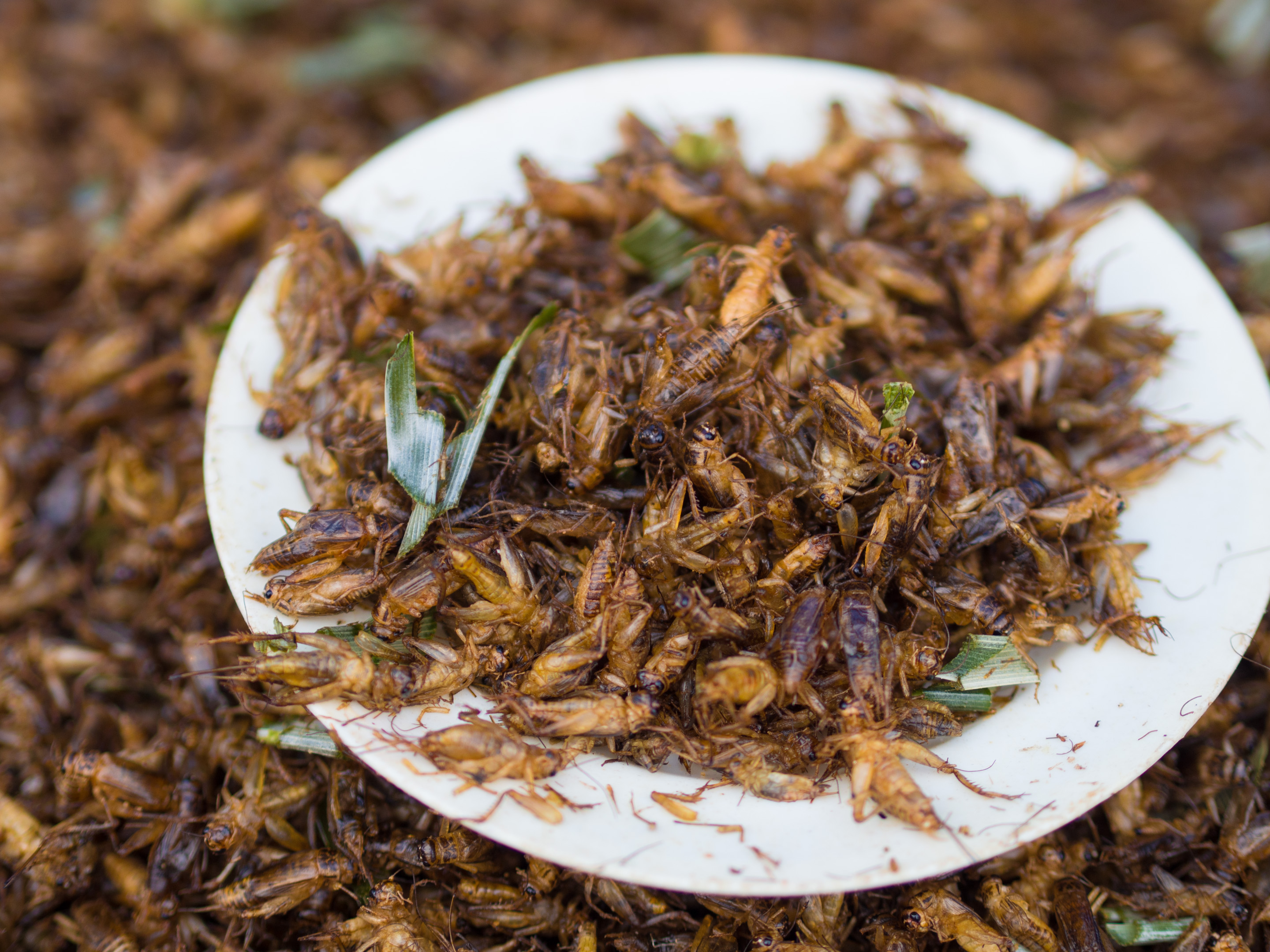
Deep-fried house crickets sold as food at a market in Thailand

The house cricket is an edible insect. It is farmed in South-East Asia and parts of Europe and North America for human consumption. In Asia, it is said to become more popular than many native cricket species due to what consumers claimed was their superior taste and texture. Dry-roasting is common and is considered the most nutritious method of preparing them, though they are often sold deep-fried as well. Farmed house crickets are mostly freeze-dried and often processed into a powder known as cricket flour. In Europe, the house cricket is officially approved for use in food products in Switzerland (since 2017) and in the European Union member states (since 2022). In the EU, the house cricket was approved as novel food in frozen, dried and powdered forms with the Commission Implementing Regulation (EU) 2022/188 of 10 February 2022. Before that, the European Food Safety Authority had published a safety assessment on August 17, 2021, stating that frozen and dried formulations from whole house crickets are safe for consumption.

Despite these developments, large-scale industrial production of house crickets remains challenging. In North America, Aspire Food Group opened the world’s largest cricket processing facility in London, Ontario, in 2022 with a capacity of 13 million kilograms annually. However, despite government support, the company faced financial difficulties and had to sell its assets in 2025 due to high debt, illustrating some of the economic and logistical challenges of scaling insect farming for human consumption.

=== Nutritional value ===
House crickets are an incomplete protein source, deficient in tryptophan and lysine. They contain both omega-3 and omega-6 fatty acids.

Despite their nutritional value, insects such as house crickets are not widely accepted as food in Western countries. Surveys have found that while many people are willing to try plant-based meat substitutes, only a small proportion would consider eating insects.

Nutrition information
Serving size: 1 1/2 cup (30g)
Quantity per serving
| Calories | 150 | |
| Total fat | 6 | g |
| Saturated fat | 2.3 | g |
| Trans fat | 0.05 | g |
| Cholesterol | 50 | mg |
| Sodium | 100 | mg |
| Total carbohydrate | 6 | g |
| Dietary fiber | 6 | g |
| Protein | 18 | g |
| Vitamin D | 0.22 | |
| Vitamin B12 | 0.86 | μg |
| Calcium | 38.5 | mg |
| Iron | 1.6 | mg |
| Potassium | 273 | mg |

== Genome ==
A chromosome-level genome assembly of Acheta domesticus was reported in 2023, providing the first high-quality genomic resource for this species. The assembled genome provides a reference for studies of insect development, physiology, and the use of crickets as sustainable food and feed.

Earlier transcriptomic analyses across life stages supported gene discovery and functional annotation in A. domesticus, enabling investigations of metabolism, immunity, and growth.
