= William H. Cade =

American entomologist

William Henry Cade (July 5, 1946 – December 29, 2025) was an American-Canadian biologist who served as the president and vice-chancellor of the University of Lethbridge from 2000 to 2010. Before serving as president and vice-chancellor, he was dean of science at Brock University and vice president, there. His research articles dealt mainly with entomology and animal behavior, particularly with field crickets.

== Education ==
Cade completed his BA (1968), MA (1972) and PhD (1976) in zoology at the University of Texas at Austin. While an undergraduate at Texas, Cade became a member of the Tau chapter of Kappa Sigma fraternity.

== Family ==
Cade's wife, Elsa Salazar Cade (born 1952, San Antonio, Texas), is a Mexican-American science teacher and entomologist. She was selected as one of the top ten science teachers in 1995 by the National Science Teachers Association for her efforts in expanding educational opportunities for underprivileged students, particularly those with disabilities from lower income communities. The Cades have also donated nearly $130,000 to Lethbridge University through their Bill and Elsa Salazar Cade scholarship in Evolutionary Biology. Amongst her many endeavors in advocacy for disabled students within science education, Salazar contributed to a collaborative effort amongst educators to develop and design science projects that promote the inclusivity of high school students with learning disabilities. Beyond her contributions to science education, Salazar Cade and her husband were recognized for their philanthropic work. Their efforts to support Haitian disaster survivors included fundraising for shelter and critical supplies. In 2010, the Association of Fundraising Professionals in Calgary honored them with the Generosity of Spirit Award on National Philanthropy Day.

== Research ==
William Cade did research in evolution of animal behavior, insect reproductive behavior, acoustic signals in cricket, cockroach mating behavior, and parasite-prey coevolution.

=== Flies and crickets ===
With his wife, Cade did more than 30 years of research on the Texas field cricket, Gryllus texensis. He also had a long collaboration with Dan Otte collecting and studying the crickets and grasshoppers of Africa. In 1975, together with his wife, he discovered the parasitic fly Ormia ochracea is attracted to the song of male crickets. Only female flies are attracted to the song, and they deposit living larvae on and in the vicinity of calling males. The larvae burrow into and eat the cricket who dies in about 7 days when the flies pupate. This was the first example of a natural enemy that locates its host or prey using the mating signal of the host/prey. In 2006, research by Marlene Zuk revealed that pressure from the O. ochracea caused the crickets to evolve a silent male with wings that look like female wings, one of the fastest recorded examples of evolution.

== Selected publications ==
- Cade, William H.; Cade, Elsa Salazar (1992-01-01). "Male mating success, calling and searching behaviour at high and low densities in the field cricket, Gryllus integer". Animal Behaviour. 43 (1): 49–56. doi:10.1016/S0003-3472(05)80070-3. ISSN 0003-3472. S2CID 54233067.

Academic offices
Preceded by Howard E. Tennant	President of University of Lethbridge; 2000–2010	Succeeded by Michael J. Mahon
