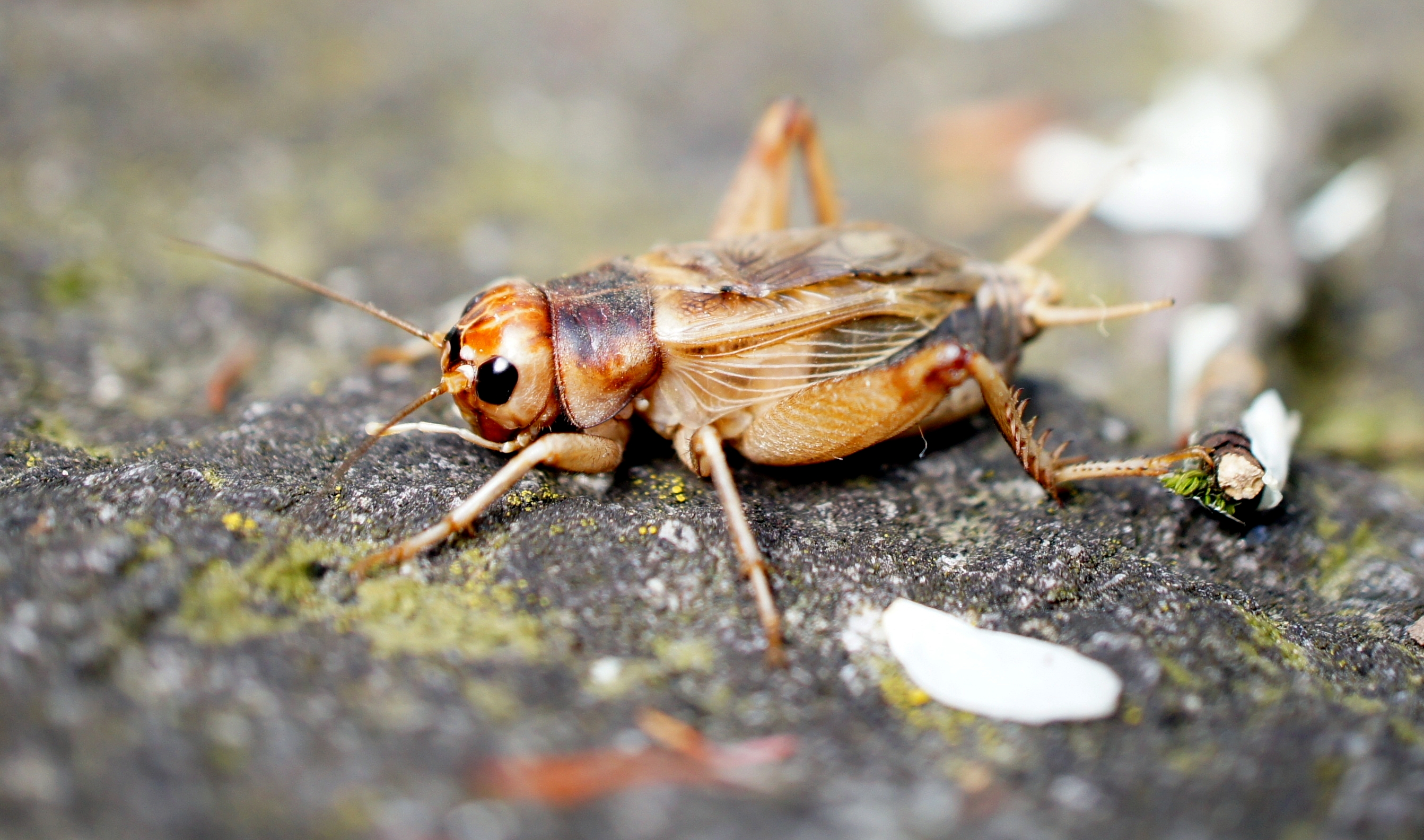
- Gryllus assimilis male

Scientific classification
- Kingdom: Animalia
- Phylum: Arthropoda
- Class: Insecta
- Order: Orthoptera
- Suborder: Ensifera
- Family: Gryllidae
- Genus: Gryllus
- Species: G. assimilis

Binomial name
- Gryllus assimilis (Fabricius, 1775)

Synonyms
- G. aztecus Saussure, 1859; G. collocatus Walker, 1869; G. cubensis Saussure, 1859; G. determinatus Walker, 1869; G. luridus Walker, 1869; G. mexicanus Saussure, 1859; G. neglectus Scudder, 1862; G. septentrionalis Walker, 1869; G. similaris Walker, 1869

= Gryllus assimilis =

Species of cricket native to the Western Hemisphere

Gryllus assimilis, commonly known as the Jamaican field cricket and sometimes referred to as the silent cricket (a misnomer (Note: Males produce a calling song which is quieter than that of many other cricket species, making them more attractive to hobbyists raising them as food for pets, but are not actually "silent".)) among other names, (Note: Also referred to as the brown cricket (though that name is often used for the house cricket), Steppengrille, and steppe cricket.) is one of many cricket species known as a field cricket. Its natural habitats are the West Indies and parts of the southern United States, Mexico, and South America, though as a result of widespread breeding programs to supply feeder insects to the pet industry since 2010, it has become available commercially throughout North America and Europe.

== Taxonomy ==
At one time, many field crickets found in the eastern states of the United States were assumed to be a single species and were referred to as Gryllus assimilis. However, in 1932, the entomologist B. B. Fulton showed that four populations of field cricket in North Carolina, that were morphologically identical and which were all considered to be G. assimilis, produced four different songs. It was further observed that though some had overlapping habitats, each population had different seasonal life cycles and were unable to cross-breed. Further investigation led to the acceptance of a species complex comprising eight species in the eastern states, including two that have indistinguishable songs but different seasons of activity, and one where the males are mute. Once these eight species were distinguishable by song, tiny morphological differences were discovered between them, such as the precise number of teeth on the stridulatory mechanism. None of these species are the Jamaican field cricket, which was first described in 1775 by the Danish zoologist Johan Christian Fabricius, the type locality being Jamaica.

=== Subspecies ===
There are two subspecies:

- G. a. assimilis (Fabricius, 1775) - West Indies, United States, Mexico and South America
- G. a. pallida Saussure, 1897 - Mexico

== Distribution and habitat ==
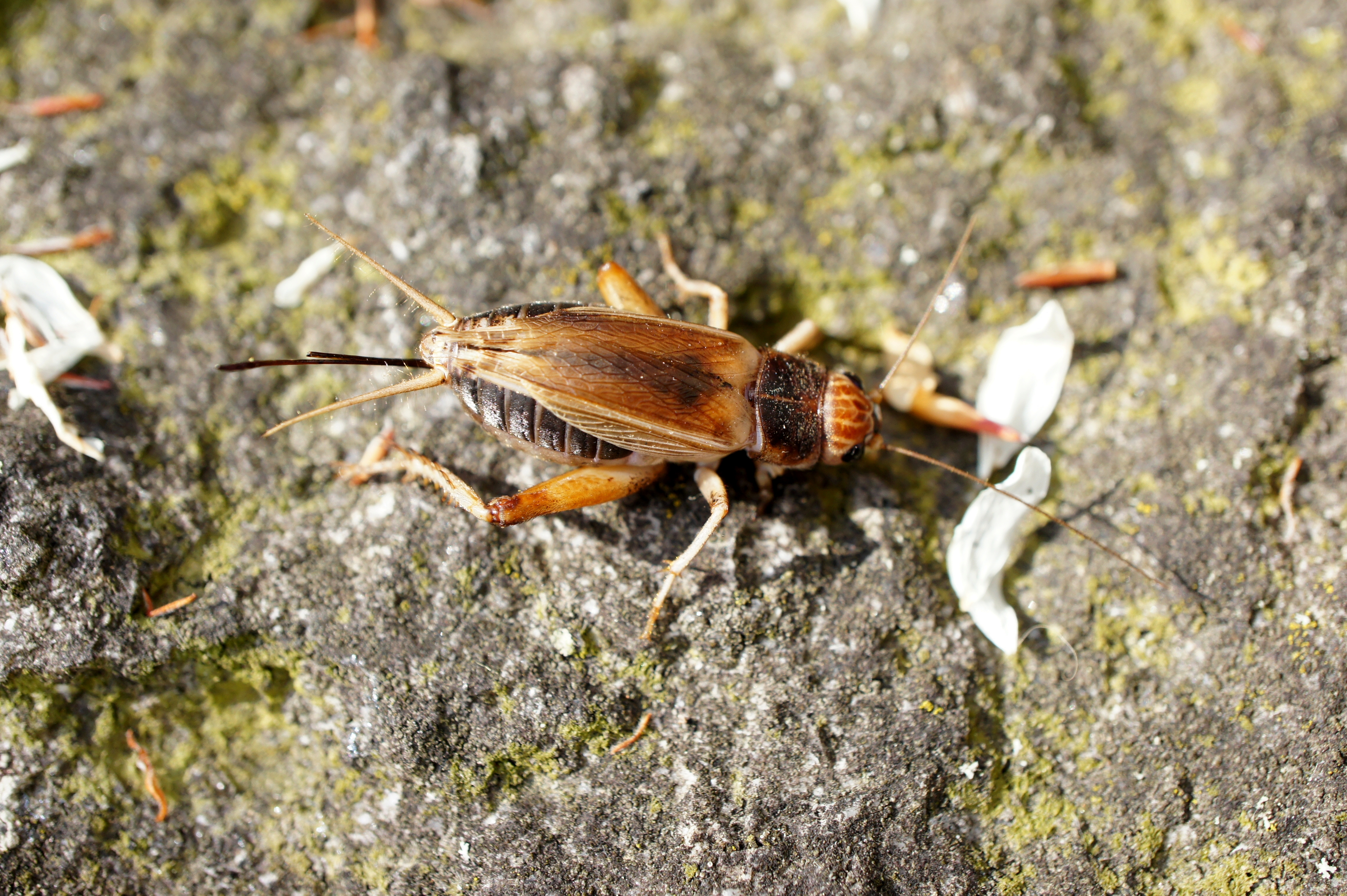
Gryllus assimilis female – the black hair-like structure visible at the posterior end is her ovipositor.

Gryllus assimilis occurs in the West Indies, southern United States, Mexico and parts of South America (Ecuador, Peru, Bolivia, Paraguay and North of Argentina). In the United States, it is limited to Florida and southern Texas. Its typical habitat is weedy fields, roadside verges, lawns and rough pasture.

== Life cycle ==
Females deposit as many as 400 eggs via an ovipositor into damp soil. At suitably warm temperatures (between 25 °C (77 °F) and 30 °C (86 °F) , eggs usually hatch in about eleven days. Nymphal stages take place for another three six to seven weeks, at which point the insect reaches sexual maturity and the males begin calling for females. Eggs are often consumed cannibalistically by adults searching the soil for food.

== As pests ==
Crickets of this species are considered pests in vegetable and flower gardens as well as in citrus nurseries. In the past they have been controlled by fumigating the soil with calcium cyanide, a highly toxic poison.

== Call ==
The call, issued only by the male, is a short, pulsed chirp emitted at intervals of about one second. The pulse rate is rapid and the intervals between the pulses brief, so each chirp sounds like a continuous sound.

== Diseases ==
The Jamaican field cricket is immune to cricket paralysis virus, a disease which swept through the cricket rearing industry in 2010 and devastated the existing stock of the commonly-purchased and very similar house crickets in the United States and Europe. This has led to the Jamaican field cricket becoming the latest "standard" cricket available for purchase as a food for pets.

== Confusion of Gryllus locorojo with Gryllus assimilis ==
The other species, Gryllus locorojo, different morphologically and by its songs, also known as "crazy red" or "banana cricket", is often confused with Gryllus assimilis. Gryllus locorojo has a medium-large body, long or short winged, typically reddish/brownish colored head with three or four longitudinal stripes visible even in specimens with darker heads. According to Varvara Vedenina, Russian Academy of Sciences, Moscow: "The cricket culture under name "Gryllus assimilis" came to the Moscow Zoo from the Berlin Zoo in the beginning of the 1990s. No details are known. A bit later, in 1997, the cricket eggs under name "Gryllus argentinus" came from Paris Museum of Natural History to St. Petersburg. These eggs definitely originated from Ecuador, since French colleagues returned from an expedition there. Both cultures appear to be identical". This cricket, predominantly known as "Gryllus assimilis" in Russia and Europe (sometimes also referred as "Gryllus argentinus"), was described as a new species by D.B. Weissman and D.A. Gray in 2012 and should not be confused neither with the true Gryllus assimilis nor with the true Gryllus argentinus.
