= Gryllus integer =

Scientific classification
- Domain: Eukaryota
- Kingdom: Animalia
- Phylum: Arthropoda
- Class: Insecta
- Order: Orthoptera
- Suborder: Ensifera
- Family: Gryllidae
- Subfamily: Gryllinae
- Tribe: Gryllini
- Genus: Gryllus
- Species: G. integer

Binomial name
- Gryllus integer Scudder, 1902

Species of cricket

Gryllus integer, commonly known as the western trilling cricket, is one of many species of field cricket (subfamily Gryllinae) in the genus Gryllus. It is called the "triller" field cricket because its song is nearly continuous rather than broken into discrete chirps. G. integer can be found in parts of the Western United States, having been recorded from Oregon, California, Arizona and New Mexico.

== Morphology ==
Gryllus integer can be medium to large in size, ranging from 17.1- 24.0 mm, it is macropterous(large-winged), its head and pronotum are jet black and tegmina is light brown.

== Habitat ==
Typical of many field crickets, G. integer can be found living in cracks or burrows in the ground in disturbed areas such as roads or by buildings, and around human habitation.

== Song production ==
Gryllus integer has a unique song known as a rapid thrill., which is produced by tegminal (forewing) stridulation. These displaying male crickets prefer to call from warmer sites and it has been found that their micro-habitat choice based on temperature can influence their mating calls. Male song varies in duration of uninterrupted trilling. Males use this call to attract sexually receptive females who tend to preferentially move toward males with longer calling bouts (periods of calling that contain no pause greater than 0.10 s in real time), although female mate preference can vary. These males tend to fight intensely and stridulate their wings more when trying to acquire females. Sexually mature males tend to be more aggressive and heavier than lighter males which have not yet produced a spermatophore. The calling song of G. integer attracts females and results in spacing between mates, but it also attracts the parasitoid female fly Ormia ochracea. This parasitoid fly lays its larvae on the surface of the cricket and burrows into its body.

== Variation ==
Male G. integer from Davis, California, do not trill but rather produce fast trains of chirps containing 2 or 3 syllables per chirp with a pause between chirps approximately 30ms long, but most commonly with 3. Females tend to respond more to 2 syllables then 3. Arizona populations of G.integer call exclusively with 2 syllables per chirp. Californian G. integer are relatively intolerant of increased syllable numbers. Californian G. integer prefer particular chirp pauses (24-36 ms) but accepted somewhat longer ones (up to 70 ms).

== Sperm competition ==
Sperm competition is the competition that occurs when females store sperm, of varying males, in their spermatheca and use this sperm to fertilize their eggs. This type of competition is prevalent when females mate more than once in which they store sperm in a viable condition and have sperm from previous matings present when they re-mate Field crickets (Gryllidae) show all of the prerequisites for sperm competition. Females mate repeatedly with different males, store the sperm in a spermatheca and sperm from previous matings is viable in the spermatheca when females re-mate. Males guard females after mating which also suggests sperm competition.

== Predators ==
This species of cricket is popular for use as a food source for insectivorous animals like spiders, reptiles, rodents, bats and birds. In addition, the tachinid fly Ormia ochracea is known to parasitize G. integer. O. ochracea uses the mating call of G. integer to locate the host, then the female fly deposits larvae on the host. Exoristoides johnsoni is also a parasitoid of G. integer.

== Anti-predator response ==
In order to evade predators, adult G. integer engage in a behavior known as "freezing." This anti-predator behavior appears to have a genetic and/or maternal effect
