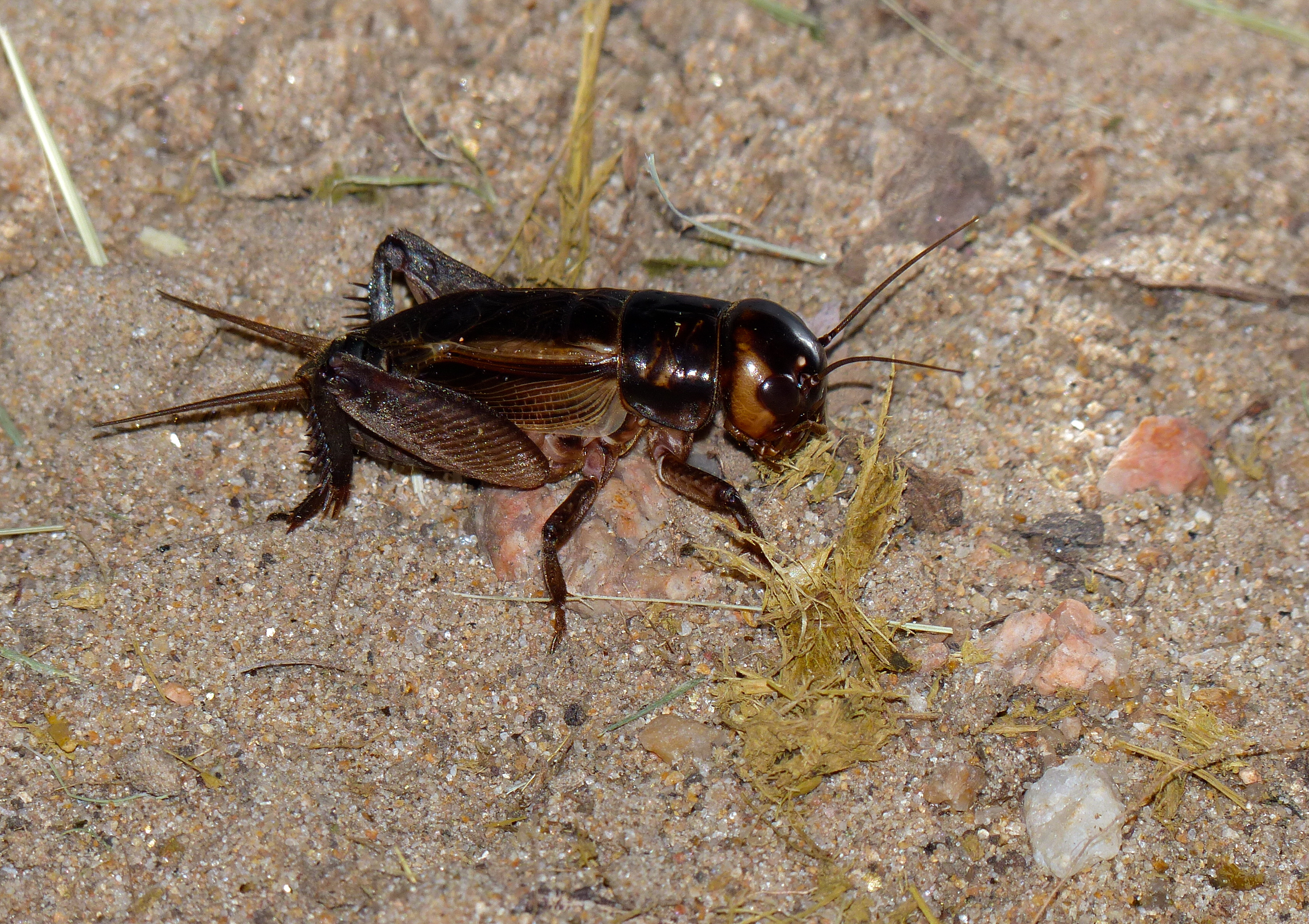

Scientific classification
- Kingdom: Animalia
- Phylum: Arthropoda
- Class: Insecta
- Order: Orthoptera
- Suborder: Ensifera
- Family: Gryllidae
- Genus: Acanthogryllus
- Species: A. fortipes

Binomial name
- Acanthogryllus fortipes (Walker,1869)

Synonyms
- Gryllus fortipes Walker, 1869; Gryllus parallelus Walker, 1869

= Acanthogryllus fortipes =

Southern African cricket species

Acanthogryllus fortipes, commonly known as the brown cricket, is a species of cricket from southern Africa. It is mostly dark brown in colour and has a large head. It is a common species in short grass, including artificial habitats such as lawns and fields.

== Description ==
This stocky cricket has a body length of about 25 mm (0.98 in). It has a large, broad head and pronotum. It is dark brown in colour but has tan areas behind the head, on the sides of the prothorax and on the elytral (hardened forewing) margins. The fore tibia have a long, apical spur and the hind tibia have eight long spurs on both the inside and outside. Both sexes have wings. In females, the ovipositor is 7.5–12 mm (0.30–0.47 in) long, slightly shorter than the hind femur.

=== Head ===
The head is mostly blackish, although it has a tan band across the vertex. The face is also blackish, with orange brown mouth part and orange cheeks.

=== Prothorax ===
The upper part of the pronotum is patterned with dark brown and pale orange. The lateral lobes are black in the upper half and pale in the lower half.

=== Wings ===
The forewings are brown but are pale along the medial vein. They never extend to the end of the abdomen. In females they extend at least two thirds of the way down the abdomen. The hindwings usually extend slightly beyond the forewings and rarely beyond the end of the abdomen. They may also be completely hidden by the forewings.

=== Legs ===
The legs are pale brown or reddish brown and are often spotted or streaked with darker brown markings. The fore tibia have a large outer tympanum and a much smaller inner tympanum. The basal tarsomere is less than a third of its length. The hind tibia are dark brown with long, conspicuous spurs. The hind femurs are orange-brown with brown stripes on the outside.

== Distribution and habitat ==
This species is found in South Africa, Zimbabwe and Mozambique, where they are present in short cropped grass. They are particularly common in human altered landscapes, such as lawns. They have also been found near rivers in game reserves, which likely exhibits their natural habitat. While it is common in parts of South Africa, most notably KwaZulu-Natal, it is considered to be invasive in others, such as the Kruger National Park in the north of the country.

== Ecology ==
=== Life cycle ===
Adults are present between November and January. By late summer, adults are scarce and nymphs are common, suggesting that mating and egg-laying take place shortly after the rains begin.

=== Song ===
The song is made up of between four and seven (most commonly four or five) successive pulse chirps. Males tend to aggregate and chirp on such a way that they are silent when their neighbours are calling. Males that sing in an alternating fashion like this call at a rate that is 30-60% slower than the rate that lone males call at. Lone males too start calling in an alternating fashion when exposed to the calls of other males. Alternate calling is only observed during sunset. Calls may overlap if they are made during the day.

=== Burrows ===
Both nymphs and adults dig deep burrows to hide in during the day. At night, they emerge to feed on grass, and possibly other plants. The crickets crop grasses and store the clippings near the entrances of their burrows. They also pile them on top of the entrances. These burrows typically have two entrances, allowing the insects to escape should a predator approach.

=== Predation ===
Sun spiders have been seen entering burrows in search of crickets. Other spiders presumably exhibit similar behaviour as a wasp has been found in a chamber with several spiders off a brown cricket burrow. At least two kinds of pompilid wasp are known to enter these burrows.

== Relationship with humans ==
The brown cricket is considered to be a pest, especially on fields and sports grounds and around young seedlings. At high densities, they can form large expanses of dead lawn. They are particularly considered to be a problematic species around cricket pitches, where they destroy the carefully maintained lawn. A study in Zimbabwe found that malathion sprays and baits could be used to control the population in such areas through causing mass mortality.
