= Dan Otte =

American entomologist

Daniel Otte (born March 14, 1939, South Africa) is a South African-American ecologist, entomologist, world expert on crickets and grasshoppers and prominent scientific illustrator. He has made significant contributions to evolutionary biology. He is curator and chairman of the Department of Entomology at the Academy of Natural Sciences in Philadelphia.

Otte was born and educated in South Africa and began his career at the University of Michigan as a postdoctoral fellow of Richard Alexander, PhD. He then served as Assistant Professor of Zoology at University of Texas at Austin from 1969 to 1975.

== Areas of research ==
Otte has contributed to the following areas of research:

- Communication and signaling systems
- Origins of organic diversity (speciation, colonization, etc.)
- Behavioral ecology
- Sexual selection
- Discovery of new cricket and grasshopper species from the Pacific region, the Caribbean islands, western United States and Africa
- Comprehensive systematic treatments of regional faunas (North America, Australia, Hawaii, Caribbean, southern Africa)
- Developing world catalogs of grasshoppers, crickets, katydids, stick insects, mantids and cockroaches
- Publicizing organic diversity via the internet (Orthoptera Species File)

== Books written for the general public ==
Otte also has illustrated the following books for general audiences:

- Behavioral Guide to African Mammals by R. D. Estes, University of California Press. 1991
- The Safari Companion: A Guide to Watching African Mammals by R. D. Estes, Chelsea Green Publishing Co., Post Mills, VT. 1992
- The Birds of North America. Alan Poole editor, American Ornithologists Union (contributing illustrator). 1992
- Limpopo River Tales: Daniel Otte (Author, Illustrator), Carin Thom (Author) Austin (July 31, 2017)

== Species files ==
Otte is the founder and principal author of "Orthoptera Species File", an online catalog providing information on all the world's grasshoppers, crickets, katydids and related species. With the world's largest collection of grasshoppers and crickets and an outstanding library, the Academy of Natural Sciences pioneered in the task of placing a catalog of all known species of a major group of insects on the Internet. The Orthoptera Species File provides access to data on one of the most economically important groups, the grasshoppers, historically one of man's important competitors.

Otte is founder and senior author of the "Mantodea Species File", a catalog of the praying mantis species of the world, and is founder and principal author of "Phasmida Species File", a catalog of the stick insects of the world.

== Documenting biodiversity ==
Otte has conducted research which documents the magnitude and origin of organic diversity in the following regions:

- North America: United States, Canada and Mexico.
- Central America: the Caribbean Islands and Costa Rica.
- South America: Argentina, Brazil, Ecuador and Venezuela.
- Southwest Pacific area: Australia, New Zealand and Malaysia.
- Pacific Islands: Galapagos, Hawaii, Fiji, Samoa and Solomons.
- Africa: South Africa, Malawi, Kenya, Tanzania, Mali, Botswana, Swaziland, Lesotho, Zimbabwe and Zambia.

== Symposium and honours ==
A symposium was held in June 2009 to honor Otte, Curator of Entomology at the Academy of Natural Sciences in Philadelphia. It was held at the University of Lethbridge, in Lethbridge, Canada. Otte received the Leidy Award for scientific excellence on November 12, 2009 at the Academy, where he has worked as curator of entomology for 35 years.
