= Field cricket =

Field cricket may refer to:

- In the British Isles a "field cricket" is the insect species Gryllus campestris;
- in North America it may refer to various species in the genus Gryllus;
- elsewhere, the term may be used for certain other genera in the Gryllinae;
- it could also apply to the field game cricket.
