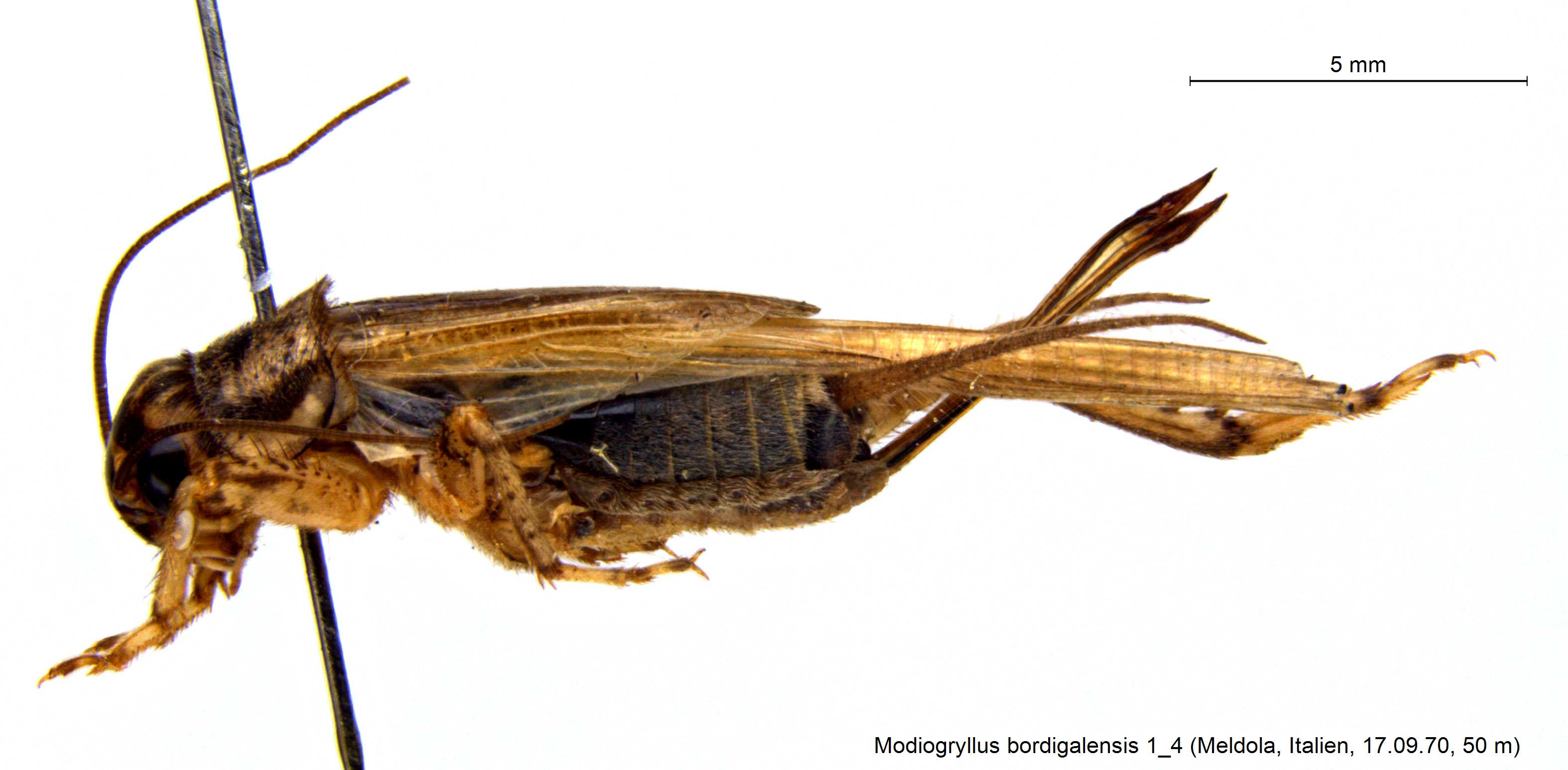
- Eumodicogryllus bordigalensis specimen

Scientific classification
- Domain: Eukaryota
- Kingdom: Animalia
- Phylum: Arthropoda
- Class: Insecta
- Order: Orthoptera
- Suborder: Ensifera
- Family: Gryllidae
- Subfamily: Gryllinae
- Tribe: Modicogryllini
- Genus: Eumodicogryllus; Gorochov, 1986

= Eumodicogryllus =

Genus of crickets

Eumodicogryllus is a genus of crickets in the family Gryllidae and tribe Modicogryllini. Species in this genus are similar to - and were originally considered a subgenus of - Modicogryllus (Eumodicogryllus); they have been recorded from: Europe, northern Africa and temperate Asia.

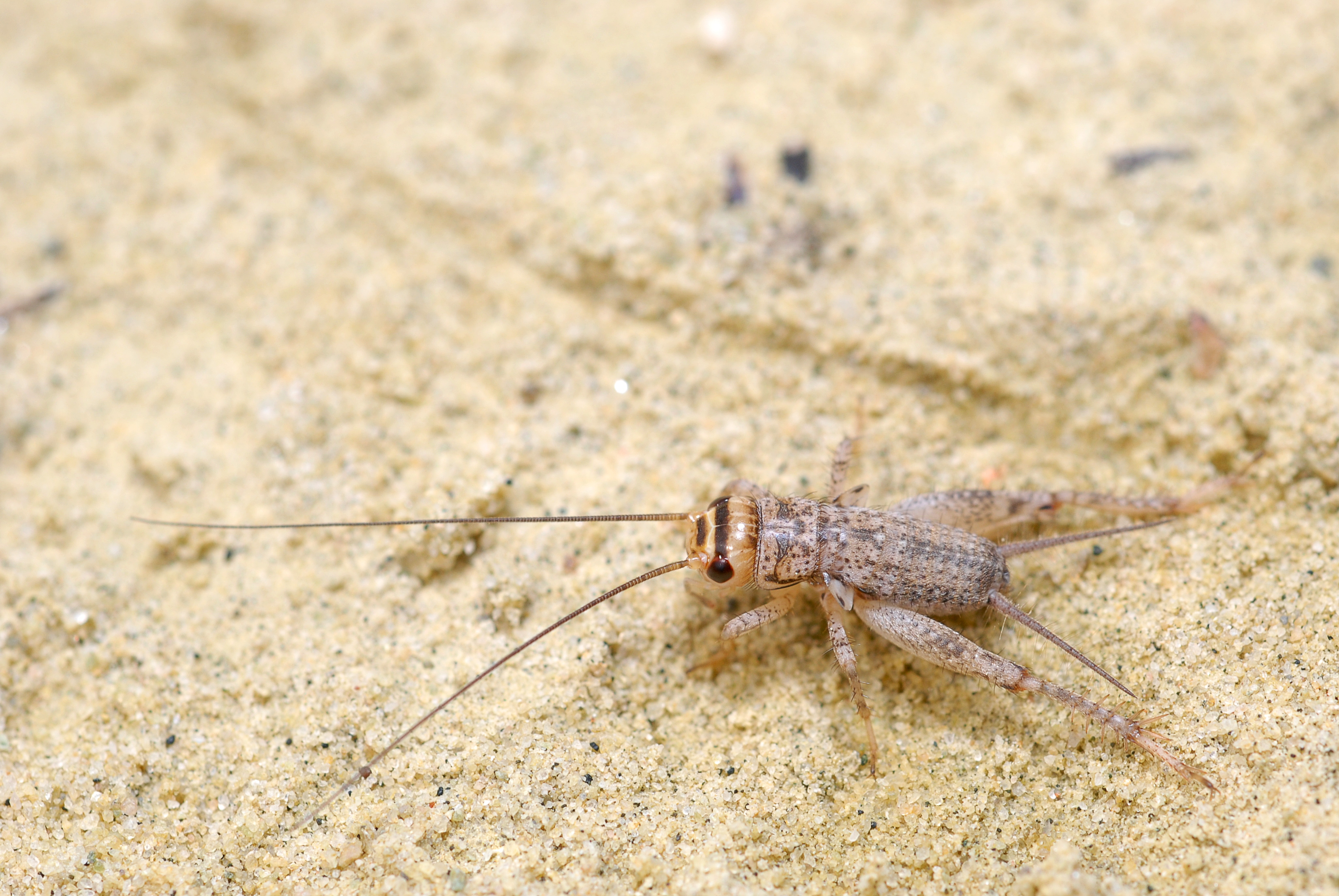
E. bordigalensis nymph

== Species ==
The Orthoptera Species File includes:

1. Eumodicogryllus bordigalensis (Latreille, 1804)
  1. type species (as Gryllus bordigalensis Latreille) is:
    subspecies E. bordigalensis bordigalensis (Latreille, 1804)
  2. subspecies E. bordigalensis turcomanorum (Semenov, 1915)
2. Eumodicogryllus chinensis (Weber, 1801)
3. Eumodicogryllus chivensis (Tarbinsky, 1930)
4. Eumodicogryllus theryi (Chopard, 1943)
5. Eumodicogryllus vicinus (Chopard, 1968)
