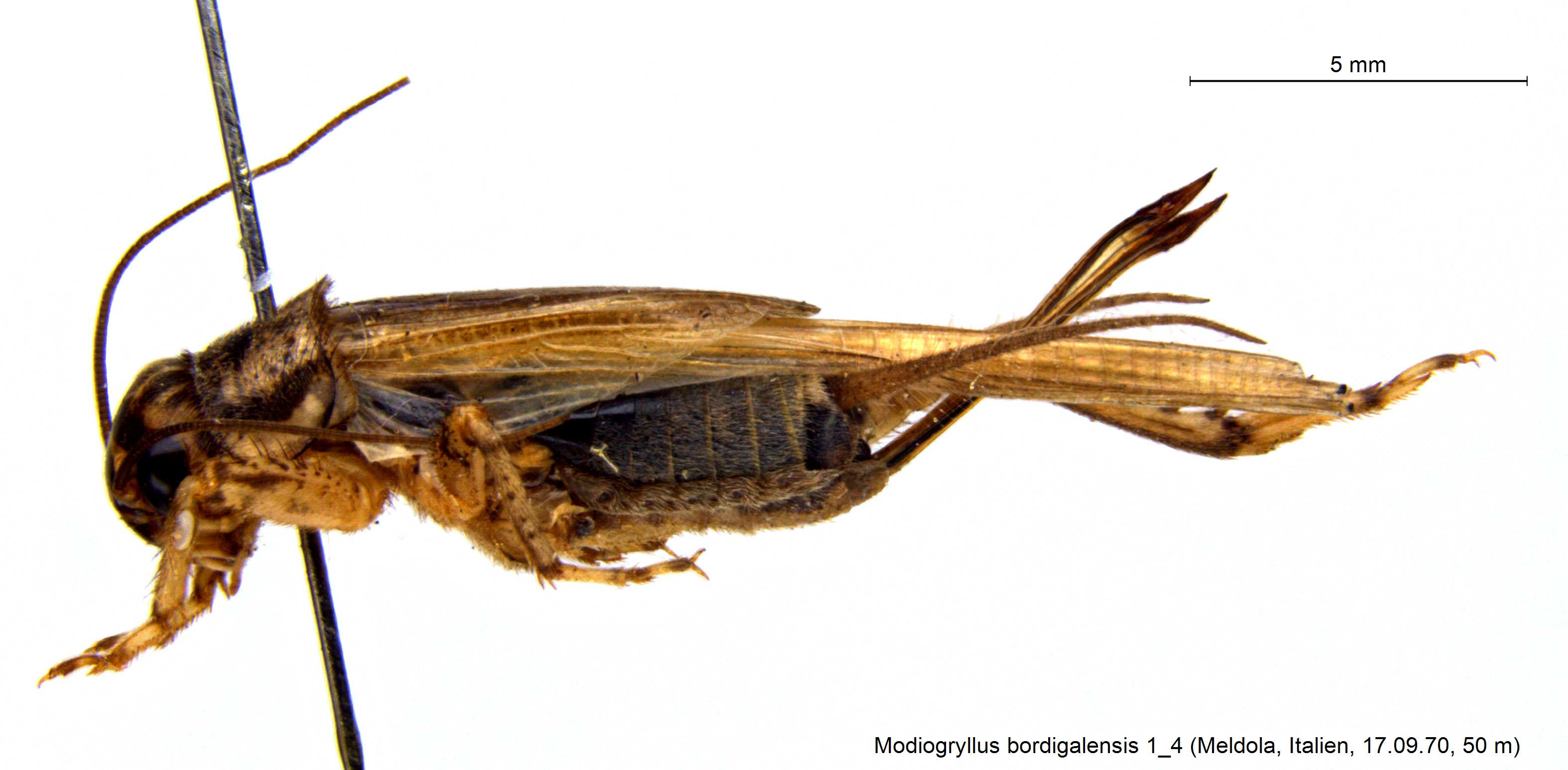
- Eumodicogryllus bordigalensis specimen

Scientific classification
- Domain: Eukaryota
- Kingdom: Animalia
- Phylum: Arthropoda
- Class: Insecta
- Order: Orthoptera
- Suborder: Ensifera
- Superfamily: Grylloidea
- Family: Gryllidae
- Subfamily: Gryllinae
- Tribe: Modicogryllini; Otte & Alexander, 1983

= Modicogryllini =

Tribe of crickets

Modicogryllini is a tribe of crickets in the family Gryllidae. Species are terrestrial, carnivorous or omnivorous and can be found in all continenents except Antarctica.

== Genera ==
The Orthoptera Species File lists:

- Acophogryllus Gorochov, 1996
  - monotypic A. schultzei (Gorochov, 1996)
- Angolagryllus Otte, 1994
  - monotypic A. macrocephala (Otte, 1987)
- Apedina Otte & Alexander, 1983
- Apterocryncus Gorochov, 1990
  - monotypic A. martini (Bolívar, 1900)
- Aritella Otte & Alexander, 1983
- Astrupia Otte, 1987
- Cyrtoprosopus Chopard, 1951
  - monotypic C. stramineus Chopard, 1951
- Eumodicogryllus Gorochov, 1986
- Geogryllus Otte & Perez-Gelabert, 2009
- Gryllopsis Chopard, 1928
- Kazuemba de Mello, 1990
  - monotypic K. walderi de Mello, 1990
- Lepidogryllus Otte & Alexander, 1983
- Mitius Gorochov, 1985
- Modicogryllus Chopard, 1961 - type genus
- Modicoides Otte & Cade, 1984
  - monotypic M. royi (Chopard, 1954)
- Mombasina Otte, 1987
  - monotypic M. rufulus (Chopard, 1932)
- Nimbagryllus Otte, 1987
- Pictorina Otte & Alexander, 1983
- Rufocephalus Otte & Alexander, 1983
- Svercacheta Gorochov, 1993
  - monotypic S. siamensis (Chopard, 1961)
- Tugainus Gorochov, 1986
  - monotypic T. dreuxi (Chopard, 1966)
- Tumpalia Otte & Alexander, 1983
- Velarifictorus Randell, 1964
