= Mitius =

Scientific classification
- Domain: Eukaryota
- Kingdom: Animalia
- Phylum: Arthropoda
- Class: Insecta
- Order: Orthoptera
- Suborder: Ensifera
- Family: Gryllidae
- Subfamily: Gryllinae
- Tribe: Modicogryllini
- Genus: Mitius; Gorochov, 1985

Genus of crickets

Mitius is a genus of crickets in the family Gryllidae and tribe Modicogryllini. Species can be found in Asia.

== Species ==
Mitius includes the following species:

- Mitius blennus (Saussure, 1877)
- Mitius castaneus (Chopard, 1937)
- Mitius enatus Gorochov, 1994
- Mitius flavipes (Chopard, 1928) - type species (as Gryllus flavipes Chopard)
- Mitius minor (Shiraki, 1911)
- Mitius minutulus Yang & Yang, 1995
- Mitius splendens (Shiraki, 1930)
