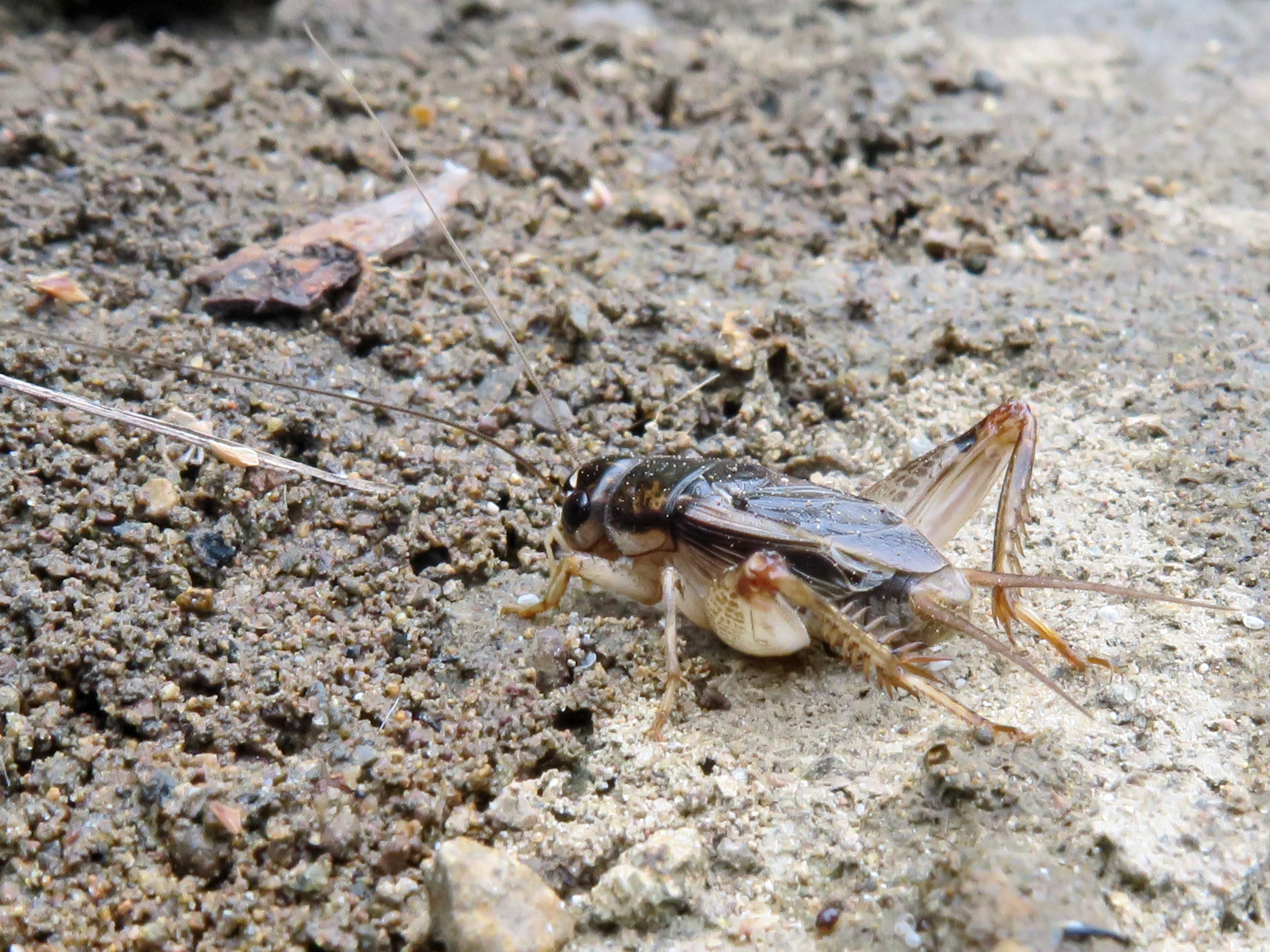
- Lepidogryllus comparatus

Scientific classification
- Domain: Eukaryota
- Kingdom: Animalia
- Phylum: Arthropoda
- Class: Insecta
- Order: Orthoptera
- Suborder: Ensifera
- Family: Gryllidae
- Subfamily: Gryllinae
- Tribe: Modicogryllini
- Genus: Lepidogryllus; Otte & Alexander, 1983

= Lepidogryllus =

Genus of crickets

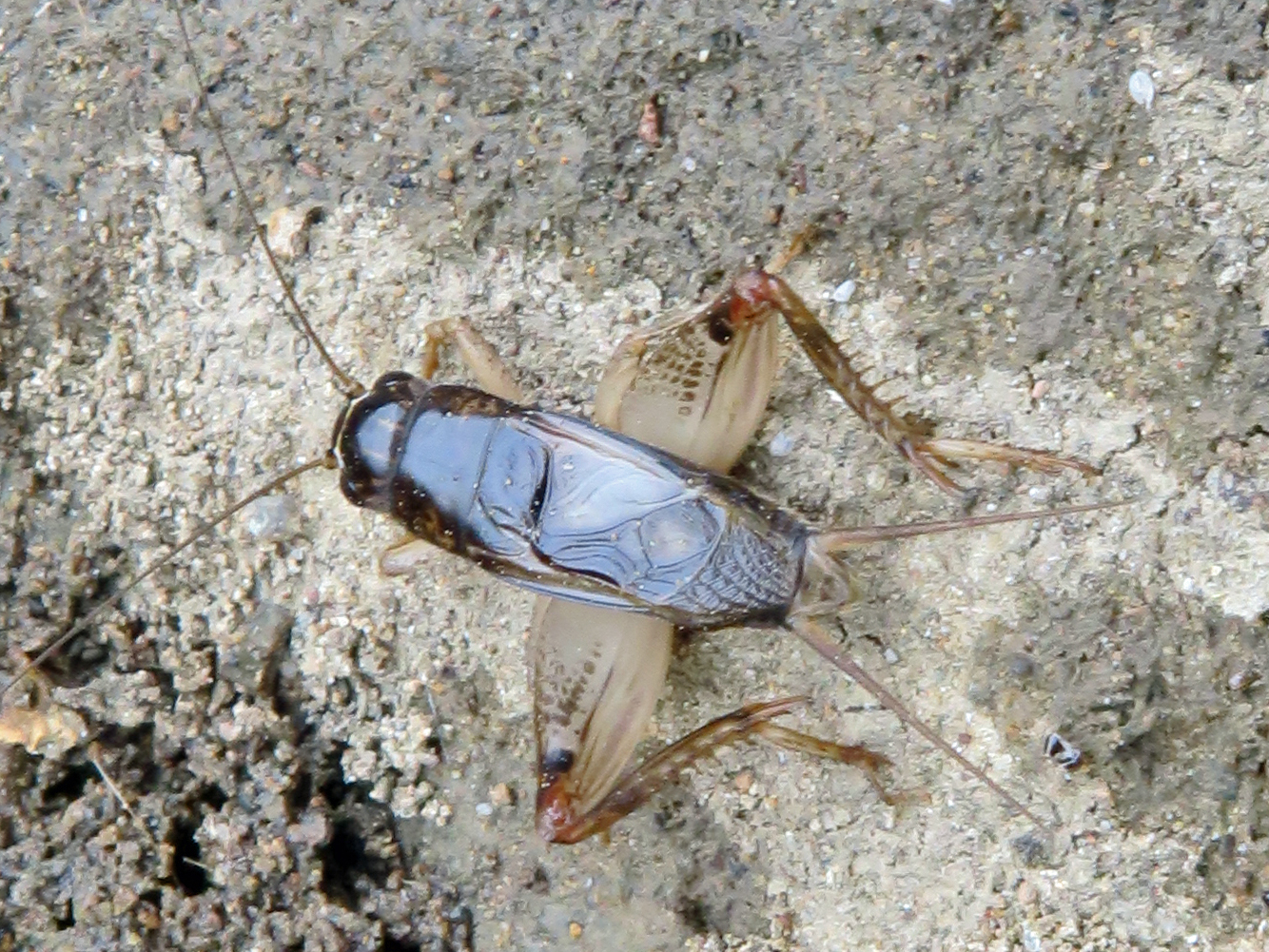
Another photo of the same L. comparatus

Lepidogryllus is a genus of crickets, sometimes known as mottled field crickets, in the family Gryllidae and tribe Modicogryllini. Species have been found in Australia, New Caledonia and Vietnam.

== Description ==
The head has a prominent white stripe connecting the lateral ocelli, a white chevron of variable size encompassing the median ocellus, and up to six prominent longitudinal stripes on the dorsal surface. The disk of the pronotum has a mottled appearance, while the lateral lobes are dark dorsally but pale ventrally. The fore tibia bears a large posterior tympanum and usually does not have an anterior one. The fore and mid legs and have few if any markings, while all of the legs are covered in dark brown setae. The male tegmen has an undivided mirror with many minute longitudinal veins throughout. The wings may be long or short, and both long-winged and short-winged individuals can be found in the same location.

== Ecology ==
Lepidogryllus comparatus has been found in dry grassy areas, on stony road banks and under stones in shrubland vegetation. Lepidogryllus darthvaderi was discovered near a tuft of grass along a road.

== Species ==
Lepidogryllus includes the following (mostly Australian) species:

- Lepidogryllus badikovi Gorochov, 1992 - Vietnam
- Lepidogryllus comparatus Walker, 1869
- Lepidogryllus darthvaderi Desutter-Grandcolas & Anso, 2016 - New Caledonia
- Lepidogryllus kimberleyanus (Baehr, 1989)
- Lepidogryllus parvulus (Walker, 1869) - type species (as Gryllus parvulus Walker)
