= Gryllopsis =

Scientific classification
- Domain: Eukaryota
- Kingdom: Animalia
- Phylum: Arthropoda
- Class: Insecta
- Order: Orthoptera
- Suborder: Ensifera
- Family: Gryllidae
- Subfamily: Gryllinae
- Tribe: Modicogryllini
- Genus: Gryllopsis; Chopard, 1928

Genus of crickets

External image
- Image at iNaturalist

Gryllopsis is a genus of crickets in the tribe Modicogryllini, erected by Lucien Chopard in 1928. Species appear to be widely distributed (records are probably incomplete): mostly in tropical Africa and Asia, with Gryllopsis caspicus the only European record (from the Caspian Sea area).

== Species ==
Yin and Liu give a key to some of the Asian species. The Orthoptera Species File lists:

1. Gryllopsis aptera Chopard, 1962
2. Gryllopsis arenicola (Annandale, 1906)
3. Gryllopsis brevicaudatus Gorochov, 1986
4. Gryllopsis cantans (Saussure, 1877)
5. Gryllopsis capitata Chopard, 1951
6. Gryllopsis caspicus Gorochov, 1986
7. Gryllopsis cingulata Chopard, 1960
8. Gryllopsis crassipes Chopard, 1938
9. Gryllopsis deminutus Chopard, 1963
10. Gryllopsis falconneti (Saussure, 1877)
11. Gryllopsis femorata Chopard, 1935
12. Gryllopsis flavifrons Chopard, 1967
13. Gryllopsis furcata (Saussure, 1877)
14. Gryllopsis fuscicornis Bey-Bienko, 1954
15. Gryllopsis hebraeus (Saussure, 1877) - type species (as Gryllodes hebraeus Saussure)
16. Gryllopsis hofmanni (Saussure, 1877)
17. Gryllopsis insularis (Holdhaus, 1909)
18. Gryllopsis longicauda Chopard, 1948
19. Gryllopsis maoria (Saussure, 1877)
20. Gryllopsis mareotica (Werner, 1905)
21. Gryllopsis marmorata Chopard, 1963
22. Gryllopsis nepalicus Ingrisch, 1987
23. Gryllopsis nigrifrons Chopard, 1951
24. Gryllopsis ornaticeps (Chopard, 1925)
25. Gryllopsis ovtshinnikovi Gorochov & Mistshenko, 1991
26. Gryllopsis pallida Chopard, 1969
27. Gryllopsis pretzmanni Kaltenbach, 1980
28. Gryllopsis pubescens Chopard, 1928
29. Gryllopsis rajasthanensis Bhowmik, 1967
30. Gryllopsis robusta Chopard, 1933
31. Gryllopsis saltator (Saussure, 1877)
32. Gryllopsis tenuitarsus Bey-Bienko, 1954
33. Gryllopsis vanharteni Gorochov, 2017
