= Modicogryllus =

Scientific classification
- Domain: Eukaryota
- Kingdom: Animalia
- Phylum: Arthropoda
- Class: Insecta
- Order: Orthoptera
- Suborder: Ensifera
- Family: Gryllidae
- Subfamily: Gryllinae
- Tribe: Modicogryllini
- Genus: Modicogryllus; Chopard, 1961

Genus of crickets

External image
- Images at iNaturalist

Modicogryllus is the type genus of crickets in the tribe Modicogryllini. Species have been recorded from: Europe, Africa, the middle East, temperate and tropical Asia through to Australia and western Pacific islands.

== Species ==
The Orthoptera Species File includes:

subgenus Amodicogryllus Gorochov, 1996

1. Modicogryllus pseudocyprius Gorochov, 1996

subgenus Modicogryllus Chopard, 1961

1. Modicogryllus abrictos Otte, 2007
2. Modicogryllus algirius (Saussure, 1877)
3. Modicogryllus alluaudi (Chopard, 1932)
4. Modicogryllus amani Otte & Cade, 1984
5. Modicogryllus angustulus (Walker, 1871)
6. Modicogryllus aterrimus Chopard, 1963
7. Modicogryllus badius Gorochov, 1988
8. Modicogryllus beibienkoi (Chopard, 1938)
9. Modicogryllus brincki (Chopard, 1955)
10. Modicogryllus buehleri (Chopard, 1954)
11. Modicogryllus castaneus (Chopard, 1928)
12. Modicogryllus chopardi Bhowmik, 1971
13. Modicogryllus clarellus (Saussure, 1877)
14. Modicogryllus concisus (Walker, 1869)
15. Modicogryllus confirmatus (Walker, 1859)
16. Modicogryllus conjunctus (Stål, 1861)
17. Modicogryllus consobrinus (Saussure, 1877)
18. Modicogryllus conspersus (Schaum, 1853) - type species (as Gryllus conspersus Schaum, locality Mozambique)
19. Modicogryllus cyprius (Saussure, 1877)
20. Modicogryllus debilis (Saussure, 1877)
21. Modicogryllus densinervis (Chopard, 1934)
22. Modicogryllus dewhursti Otte & Cade, 1984
23. Modicogryllus elgonensis (Chopard, 1938)
24. Modicogryllus extraneus (Saussure, 1877)
25. Modicogryllus facialis (Walker, 1871)
26. Modicogryllus flavus (Chopard, 1936)
27. Modicogryllus frontalis (Fieber, 1844)
28. Modicogryllus garriens Otte & Cade, 1984
29. Modicogryllus guanchicus (Krauss, 1892)
30. Modicogryllus imbecillus (Saussure, 1877)
31. Modicogryllus jagoi Otte & Cade, 1984
32. Modicogryllus kenyensis Otte & Cade, 1984
33. Modicogryllus kirschii (Saussure, 1877)
34. Modicogryllus kivuensis (Chopard, 1939)
35. Modicogryllus laticeps (Chopard, 1939)
36. Modicogryllus lefevrei (Chopard, 1938)
37. Modicogryllus luteus (Karny, 1907)
38. Modicogryllus maliensis Otte & Cade, 1984
39. Modicogryllus massaicus (Sjöstedt, 1910)
40. Modicogryllus meruensis Otte & Cade, 1984
41. Modicogryllus minimus (Chopard, 1928)
42. Modicogryllus minutus (Chopard, 1954)
43. Modicogryllus miser (Walker, 1869)
44. Modicogryllus mombasae Otte & Cade, 1984
45. Modicogryllus mulanje Otte, 1987
46. Modicogryllus nandi Otte & Cowper, 2007
47. Modicogryllus ngamius Otte, Toms & Cade, 1988
48. Modicogryllus nitidus (Chopard, 1925)
49. Modicogryllus pafuri Otte, Toms & Cade, 1988
50. Modicogryllus pallipalpis (Tarbinsky, 1940)
51. Modicogryllus pallipes (Chopard, 1925)
52. Modicogryllus parilis Otte & Cade, 1984
53. Modicogryllus perplexus Otte & Cade, 1984
54. Modicogryllus regulus (King, 1826)
55. Modicogryllus rehni Chopard, 1961
56. Modicogryllus rotundipennis (Chopard, 1938)
57. Modicogryllus segnis Otte & Cade, 1984
58. Modicogryllus semiobscurus (Chopard, 1961)
59. Modicogryllus serengetensis Otte & Cade, 1984
60. Modicogryllus signifrons (Walker, 1869)
61. Modicogryllus signipes (Walker, 1871)
62. Modicogryllus smolus Gorochov, 1988
63. Modicogryllus syriacus (Bolívar, 1893)
64. Modicogryllus tikaderi Bhowmik, 1985
65. Modicogryllus tripunctatus (Werner, 1908)
66. Modicogryllus truncatus (Tarbinsky, 1940)
67. Modicogryllus ullus Gorochov, 1988
68. Modicogryllus uncinatus (Chopard, 1938)
69. Modicogryllus vaginalis (Saussure, 1877)
70. Modicogryllus vaturu Otte & Cowper, 2007
71. Modicogryllus vicinus (Chopard, 1938)
72. Modicogryllus vitreus Roy, 1971
73. Modicogryllus vittatifrons (Chopard, 1962)
74. Modicogryllus volivoli Otte & Cowper, 2007
75. Modicogryllus walkeri Chopard, 1961
76. Modicogryllus zinzilulans Otte & Cade, 1984
77. Modicogryllus zolotarewskyi (Chopard, 1954)

subgenus Promodicogryllus Gorochov, 1986

1. Modicogryllus bucharicus (Bey-Bienko, 1933)
2. Modicogryllus ehsani Chopard, 1961
