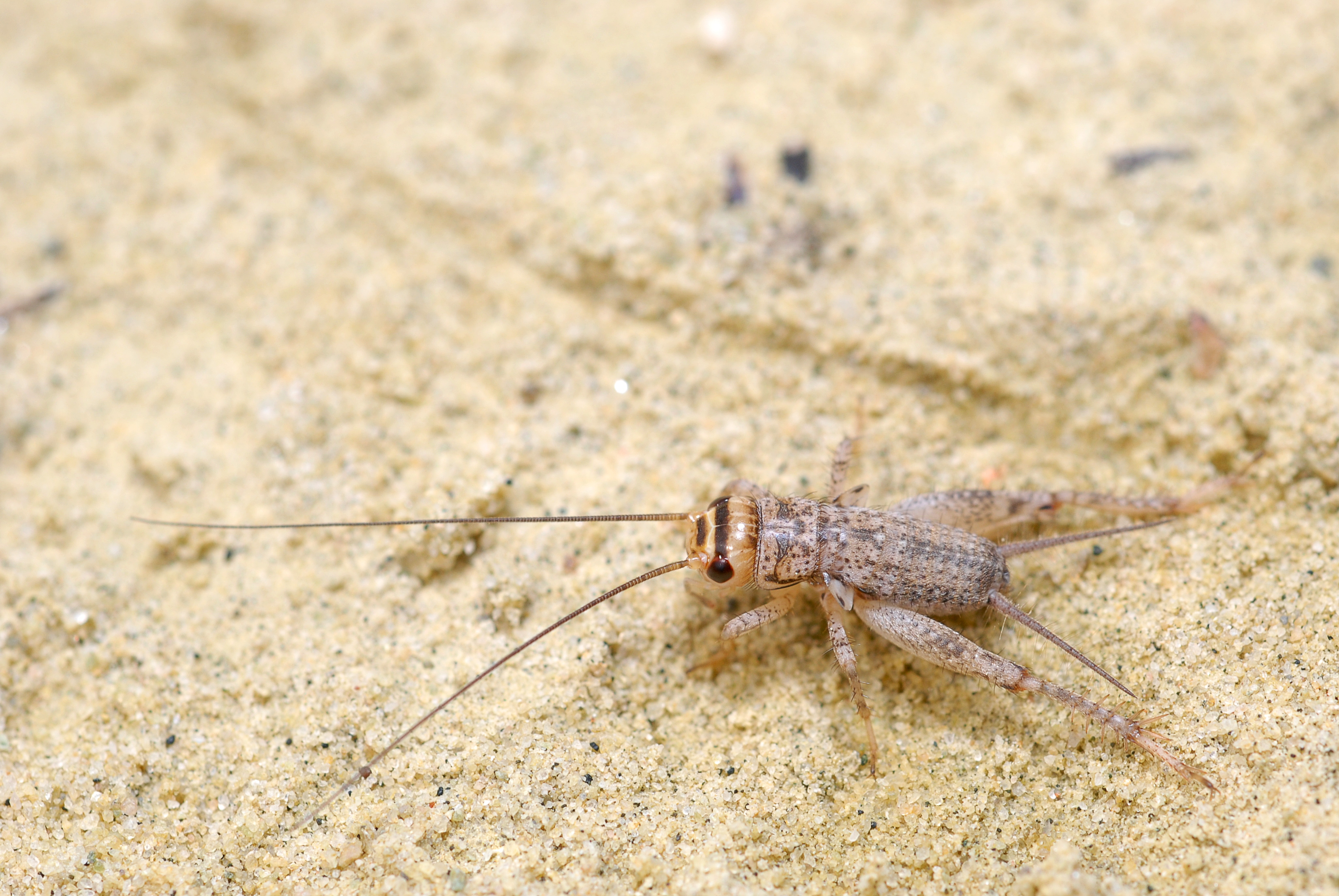

Conservation status
- Least Concern (IUCN 3.1)

Scientific classification
- Kingdom: Animalia
- Phylum: Arthropoda
- Clade: Pancrustacea
- Class: Insecta
- Order: Orthoptera
- Suborder: Ensifera
- Family: Gryllidae
- Genus: Eumodicogryllus
- Species: E. bordigalensis

Binomial name
- Eumodicogryllus bordigalensis Latreille, 1804

= Eumodicogryllus bordigalensis =

Species of insect

Eumodicogryllus bordigalensis, also known as the verge cricket, is a cricket found in Europe, Asia and Africa.

Close-up of a Eumodicogryllus bordigalensis

== Distribution ==
This species is widely distributed across the Palearctic region. Its native range includes Afghanistan (western), Albania, Algeria (northern), Armenia, Austria (eastern), Azerbaijan, Bosnia and Herzegovina, Bulgaria, China (Gansu, Inner Mongolia, Qinghai, Xinjiang), Croatia, Cyprus, the Czech Republic (southern), Egypt (northern), France (including Corsica), Georgia, Germany (southwestern), Greece (including mainland, Crete and Aegean Islands), Hungary, Iran, Iraq (northern and central), Israel, Italy (including mainland, Sicily, and Sardinia), Jordan, Kazakhstan (southern), Lebanon, Libya (northern),Moldova (southern), Mongolia (southern), Montenegro, Morocco (northern), North Macedonia, Pakistan (southern), Palestine, Poland (southern) Portugal (including mainland and Azores), Romania, Russia (central, southern and eastern European Russia), Saudi Arabia (northern), Serbia, Slovakia (southern), Slovenia, Spain (including mainland, Balearic Islands, and Canary Islands), Switzerland (northwestern), Syria, Tunisia, Turkey, Turkmenistan, Ukraine (southern and eastern), and Uzbekistan. The species has also been introduced to Belgium and the Netherlands.

It is expanding its range northwards with global warming, and has recolonised Poland after being absent since single records in 1952 and 2002. An influx in southern England in summer 2026 saw records in Sussex, at Dungeness in Kent, and at Portland Bird Observatory in Dorset.
