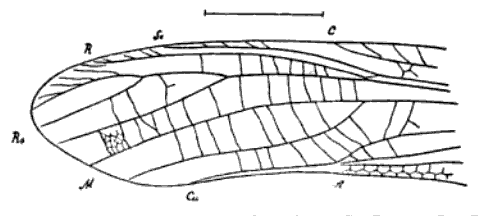
- Promastax archaicus 1910 illustration

Scientific classification
- Kingdom: Animalia
- Phylum: Arthropoda
- Clade: Pancrustacea
- Class: Insecta
- Order: Orthoptera
- Suborder: Caelifera
- Family: †Promastacidae; Kevan & Wighton, 1981
- Genus: †Promastax; Handlirsch, 1910
- Species: †P. archaicus

Binomial name
- †Promastax archaicus Handlirsch, 1910

= Promastax =

Promastax Temporal range: Ypresian

Extinct genus of insects

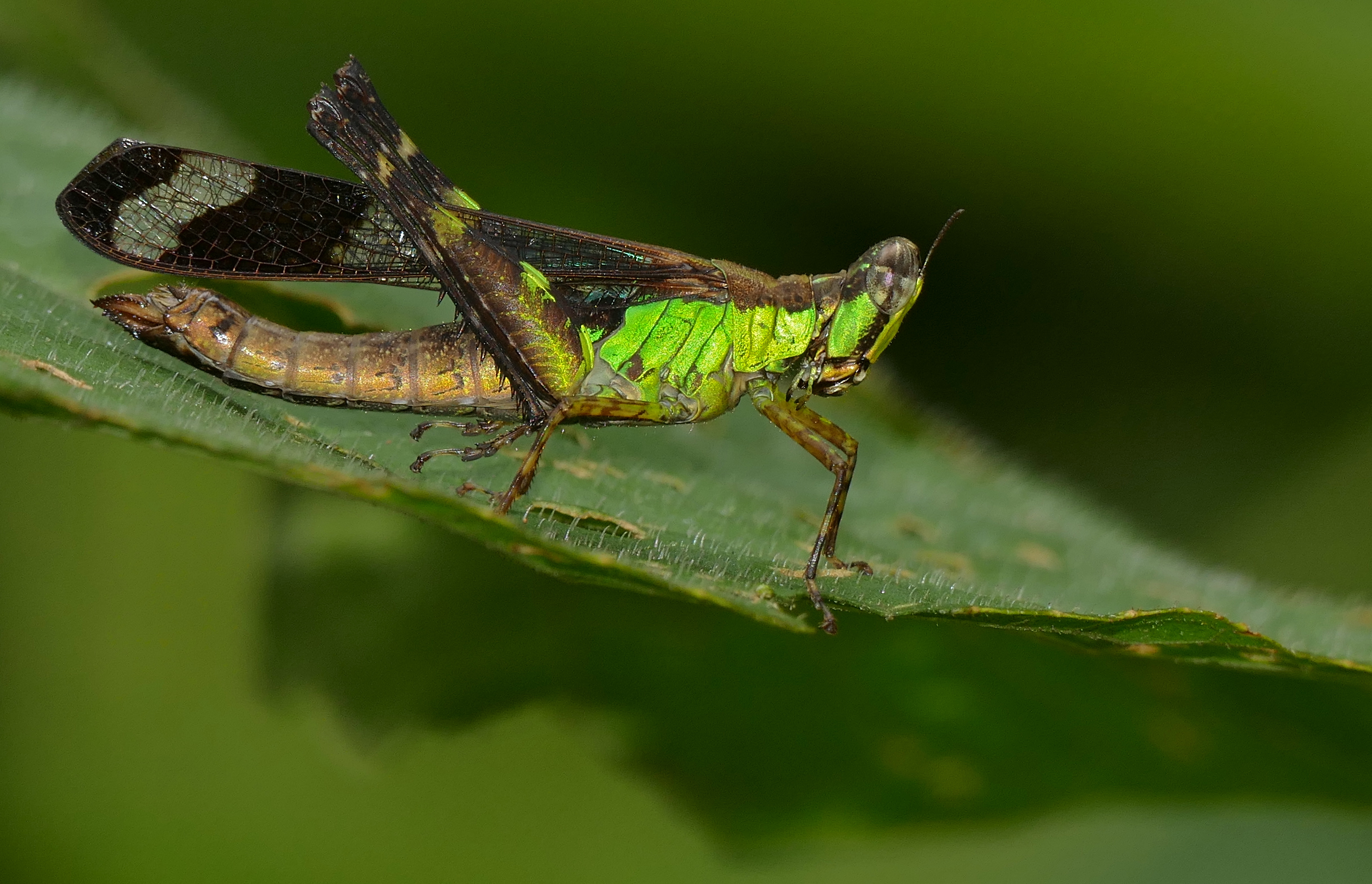
Erucius sp. monkey hopper

Promastax is a genus of "monkey grasshoppers" belonging to the extinct monotypic family Promastacidae and containing the single species Promastax archaicus. The species is dated to the Early Eocenes Ypresian stage and has only been found at the type locality in east central British Columbia.

== History and classification ==
The holotype fossil of Promastax archaicus was collected by Lawrence Lambe from outcrops of the Horsefly Shales at the horsefly Mine on 20 July 1906, and then subsequently described by Anton Handlirsch in 1910. The type description was published in his Canadian fossil Insects. 5. Insects from the Tertiary lake deposits of the southern interior of British Columbia, along with a number of other Okanagan Highlands insect species. Handlirsch did not include the etymological derivation of genus or species names in the volume.

Handlirsch initially grouped Promastax into the orthopteran superfamily Acridioidea without making a more precise placement. He noted a gross similarity with the Acridinae subfamily as then defined, but that it differed in the venation of the wing apex. The short cubital region he likened to "Mastacinae" genera, but again noted the significant differences within the venation of Promastax archaicus as reason not to place the genus there. The genus was not discussed in any depth again until Kevan and Wighton (1981) described a series of orthopteroid fossils from the Paleocene Paskapoo Formation in central Alberta. Along with the monotypic Promastacoides, Promastax was referred by Kevan and Wighton (1981) to a new family Promastacidae which they placed in the superfamily Eumastacoidea. Kevan and Wighton identified Promastacoides as a very primitive member of Eumastacoidea and together with Promastax shared a close relationship to the family "Eruciidae". However Promastacoides was subsequently identified as a Susumaniinae stick insect leaving the family Promastacidae with only Promastax. The quality of the characters defined for the erection of Promastacidae were noted as few and of poor quality by Schubnel et al. (2020), and they stated that the family should be revised.

== Distribution and paleoenvironment ==
Promastax archaicus lived in the forests surrounding the Horsefly Shales lake system during the Early Eocene Climatic Optimum. The horsefly shales have not been radiometrically dated, but based on shared floral and faunal taxa found in other Early Eocene, Ypresian, age Okanagan Highlands sites, Horsefly is assumed to be contemporaneous. The lake was subject to season summer algal bloom of the diatom Eoseira wilsonii, with the polysaccharide slime grown by E. wilsonii suggested to have enhanced the preservation quality of organisms that were coated with slime films before entombment in the lake bottom.

The greater Eocene Okanagan Highlands likely had a mesic upper microthermal to lower mesothermal climate, in which winter temperatures rarely dropped low enough for snow, and which were seasonably equitable. The Okanagan Highlands paleoforest surrounding the lakes have been described as precursors to the modern temperate broadleaf and mixed forests of Eastern North America and Eastern Asia. Based on the fossil biotas the lakes were higher and cooler then the coeval coastal forests preserved in the Puget Group and Chuckanut Formation of Western Washington, which are described as lowland tropical forest ecosystems. Estimates of the paleoelevation range between 0.7–1.2 km (0.43–0.75 mi) higher than the coastal forests. This is consistent with the paleoelevation estimates for the lake systems, which range between 1.1–2.9 km (1,100–2,900 m), which is similar to the modern elevation 0.8 km (0.50 mi), but higher. Estimates of the mean annual temperature have been derived from leaf margin analysis (LMA) of the Horsefly shales with the LMA returning a mean annual temperature of approximately 10.4 ± 2.2 °C (50.7 ± 4.0 °F). The estimated cold month mean temperature during the winter is placed at approximately 5.3 ± 2.8 °C (41.5 ± 5.0 °F). These estimates are lower than the mean annual temperature estimates given for the coastal Puget Group, which is estimated to have been between 15–18.6 °C (59.0–65.5 °F). The bioclimatic analysis for Horsefly suggests a mean annual precipitation amount of 105 ± 47 cm (41 ± 19 in).

The Okanagan Highlands fossil sites, which includes the Eocene formations between the Driftwood Shales near Smithers, British Columbia in the north and the Klondike Mountain Formation surrounding Republic, Washington to the south have been described collectively as one of the "Great Canadian Lagerstätten" based on the diversity, quality and unique nature of the biotas that are preserved. The highlands temperate biome preserved across such a large transect of lakes recorded many of the earliest appearances of modern genera, while also documenting the last stands of ancient lines. The warm temperate highland floras in association with downfaulted lacustrine basins and active volcanism are noted to have no exact modern equivalents. This is due to the more seasonally equitable conditions of the Early Eocene, resulting in much lower seasonal temperature shifts. However, the highlands have been compared to the upland ecological islands in the Virunga Mountains within the Albertine Rift of the African rift valley.

== Description ==
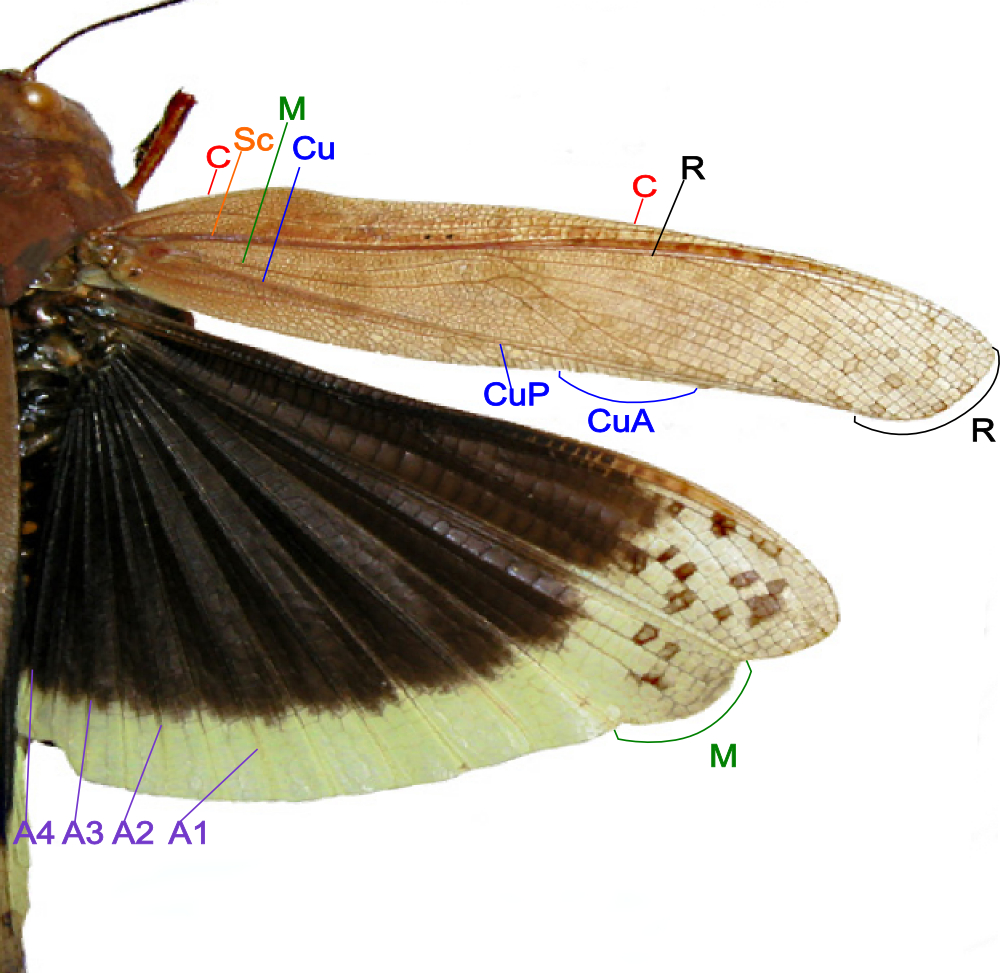
modern grasshopper wings with the major veins labeled

The only described fossil of Promastax archaicus is the holotype forewing, which is incomplete, missing the basal region of the wing. The preserved length is given by Handlirsch (1910) as 18 mm (0.71 in) with an estimated complete length of 25 mm (0.98 in) though Kevan and Wighton (1981) suggested the full length might be longer. The wing has a rounded apical margin, and a width that does not exceed being a quarter that of the length. Along the posterior margin, the anal area, marked as A in the illustration, extends less than half the wing length, while along the costal margin the costal vein, marked as C, also extends about halfway along the wing. The precostal area, the region between the costal vein and the wing edge is described as large, as is the costal region, the area between the costal and subcostal vein. The subcostal, marked as Sc, and Radius, marked as R, run close to each other, with only a narrow space between before the subcostal turns upwards and terminates at the wing margin. The sector radii, marked Rs, forks two times, with the main Rs vein angling upwards to the costal margin before curving slightly to the posterior and terminating at the wings apical margin. On the costal side the main Rs, a series of four small veins branch off near the end of the vein, while two larger branches fork off from the posterior side more basally and angle towards the posterior margin. The medial, marked M, and cubital, marked Cu, veins are each separated by larger open spaces, with only a single branch from the medial vein forking off the posterior side between it and the cubital vein.
