= Erucius magnificus =

Scientific classification
- Kingdom: Animalia
- Phylum: Arthropoda
- Class: Insecta
- Order: Orthoptera
- Suborder: Caelifera
- Superfamily: Eumastacoidea
- Family: Chorotypidae
- Subfamily: Eruciinae
- Genus: Erucius
- Species: E. magnificus

Binomial name
- Erucius magnificus Rehn JAG, 1904

Synonyms
- Erucius vitreus Brunner von Wattenwyl, 1898

Species of grasshopper

Erucius magnificus is a species of 'monkey grasshopper' in the family Chorotypidae, erected by James Rehn in 1904; no subspecies listed in the Catalogue of Life. The type locality was in Borneo (Labuan Is.) and current records also include Vietnam.
