= China (insect) =

Scientific classification
- Domain: Eukaryota
- Kingdom: Animalia
- Phylum: Arthropoda
- Class: Insecta
- Order: Orthoptera
- Suborder: Caelifera
- Family: Chorotypidae
- Subfamily: Chininae
- Genus: China; Burr, 1899

Type species
- Mastax mantispoides Walker, 1870

Species
- China mantispoides (Walker, 1870)

Genus of grasshoppers

External image
- Images at iNaturalist

China is a genus of grasshoppers in the family Chorotypidae. As of 2018, it is monospecific, consisting of its sole species China mantispoides. (Note: The name of the genus in Chinese is 秦蜢属, qínměngshǔ. The species is known in Chinese as 摹螳秦蜢 mótángqínměng, 幕螳秦蜢 mùtángqínměng, 幕膛秦蜢 mùtángqínměng, or 曼秦蜢 mànqínměng.) It is found in China, Thailand, and Myanmar. Malcolm Burr first circumscribed the genus in 1899; the species C. mantispoides was described in 1870 by Francis Walker. It is a pest of hickory trees.

== Distribution ==
Although China has sometimes been described as being endemic to China, its range extends to other countries in Mainland Southeast Asia. The type locality of C. mantispoides was recorded as just "China".

C. mantispoides is found in central and southern China. Its range includes the provinces of Anhui, Fujian, Guangdong, Henan, Hubei, Hunan, Jiangsu, Jiangxi, Sichuan, and Zhejiang. It is found in Dabie Mountains, Hubei Province, at elevations of 400–850 metres (1,310–2,790 ft) in mixed evergreen and deciduous broad-leaved forests. This species has also been observed in the Bamianshan Nature Reserve, Hunan; this is within the Nanling Mountains and is mostly a forest of subtropical broad-leafed evergreens. C. mantispoides has also been reported in the Sanjiang wetlands in Linhai, Zhejiang.

C. mantispoides has been reported in Thailand. In addition, a specimen identified as China cf. mantispoides was found in the Sakaerat Biosphere Reserve, Khorat Plateau, Nakhon Ratchasima, Thailand; this is part of the central Indochina dry forests. The range of C. mantispoides also extends into Myanmar; it has been recorded in Lashio.

== Taxonomic history ==
The British entomologist Francis Walker first described C. mantispoides in 1870; he placed it in the genus Mastax. (Note: The Orthoptera genus Mastax Perty, 1832 is now known as Eumastax, its replacement name.) Walker based his description on a single male specimen. The holotype was deposited in the British Museum. The British entomologist Malcolm Burr then transferred this species to his new genus, China, which he circumscribed in 1899. Burr included only C. mantispoides in his circumscription of China.

Burr initially placed China in a new group, Chinae; in 1903, he changed this group to the subfamily Chininae. Subsequent orthopterists like Cándido Bolívar Pieltain in 1930, James A. G. Rehn in 1948, and Marius Descamps in 1974 have followed in placing China in this subfamily. However, Grigory Bey-Bienko's 1951 taxonomy placed China in the subfamily Eumastacinae. As of 2018, the Orthoptera Species File recognizes Chininae as a valid subfamily which includes China.

== Description ==
The antennae of China are very short, and are filiform in shape. The wings and tegmina extend past hind femora. Spines along the inside of the hind tibiae get gradually longer distally; the spines are otherwise homogeneous and none are markedly longer.

The body of C. mantispoides is black with a tawny underside. Its antennae are black with a pale yellow colouring at their base. The sides of the prothorax are tawny. The legs are also tawny, and the tarsi and tips of the tibiae are blackish.

The hind tibiae of C. mantispoides have 22 spines along their outside and 19 longer spines along their inside. Dark bands go transversely across the hind femora. For male and female C. mantispoides, respectively, the body length is 17–18 mm (0.67–0.71 in) and 22–23 mm (0.87–0.91 in), the forewings' length is 19–20 mm (0.75–0.79 in) and 17–18 mm (0.67–0.71 in), and the hind femora's length is 10–11 mm (0.39–0.43 in) and 11–12 mm (0.43–0.47 in). The males' tegmina have a length of 19 mm (0.75 in) and the females have a tegmen length of 17.8 mm (0.70 in).

== Biology ==
C. mantispoides is univoltine. The eggs hatch in late May after overwintering. The nymph has five instars. In early October, females lay at least ten eggs 1 cm (0.39 in) deep in the soil. Adults do not exhibit phototaxis. Adult males can fly up to 5 meters (16 ft) at once. C. manispoides can be found on the trunks of pine trees like the Chinese red pine; their colouration acts as camouflage.

Natural predators include the Chinese blackbird, red-billed blue magpie. The spider Oxyopes sertatus is a predator of its nymph, and various predatory ants feed upon the eggs. C. mantispoides eats various grasses and weeds. It also feeds on the leaves of the following plants:

- Carya cathayensis (Chinese hickory)
- Glochidion puberum
- Ulmus pumila (Siberian elm)
- Cornus officinalis (Japanese cornel)
- Diospyros kaki (Oriental persimmon)
- Liquidambar formosana (Chinese sweet gum)
- Diospyros lotus (date-plum)
- Quercus fabrei (Faber's oak)
- Rhus chinensis (Chinese sumac)
- Platycarya strobilacea
- Quercus glandulifera
- Rosa multiflora (multiflora rose)
- Smilax china (China root)
- Cayratia japonica (Japanese cayratia herb)
- Rosa laevigata (Cherokee rose)
- Caragana sinica

== As a pest ==
C. mantispoides is one of the main pests of hickory in Zhejiang. They feed on the leaves from June to October; the most serious damage is in mid-October. Trees afflicted by this pest end up with dead leaves, often leaving no more than the veins. This weakens the trees' ability to photosynthesize and interferes with the harvest of their fruit. Researchers have suggested a mix of trichlorfon and urine to combat C. mantispoides as a pest; the urine lures the grasshoppers away from the trees. Others have also suggested digging and turning over soil in October so their eggs freeze. C. mantispoides is also an occasional pest of indica and japonica rice in the Xinyang region.
