= Plagiotriptus pinivorus =

Scientific classification
- Kingdom: Animalia
- Phylum: Arthropoda
- Class: Insecta
- Order: Orthoptera
- Suborder: Caelifera
- Family: Thericleidae
- Genus: Plagiotriptus
- Species: P. pinivorus

Binomial name
- Plagiotriptus pinivorus Descamps, 1977

Species of grasshopper

Plagiotriptus pinivorus, the African pine-feeding grasshopper, is a species of thericleid orthopteran. It is native to eastern Africa, where it is usually found in areas with moderate or heavy rainfall, mostly in the range 1,525 to 2,135 m (5,000 to 7,000 ft), but sometimes at lower elevations down to about 500 m (1,640 ft).

== Description ==
The adult male is laterally compressed and about 1.5 to 2 cm (0.6 to 0.8 in) long. It has very short antennae, and a large, shield-like pronotum which conceals tiny, vestigial wings. The femora are well-developed and the abdomen sharply upturned. The female is double the size of the male, broader and more heavily-built, and also has small, non-functional wings. Both sexes have yellow eyes and are mainly light green, the male having inconspicuous specks of red, pink, white and blue on various appendages while the female has yellow ovipositor valves.

== Ecology ==
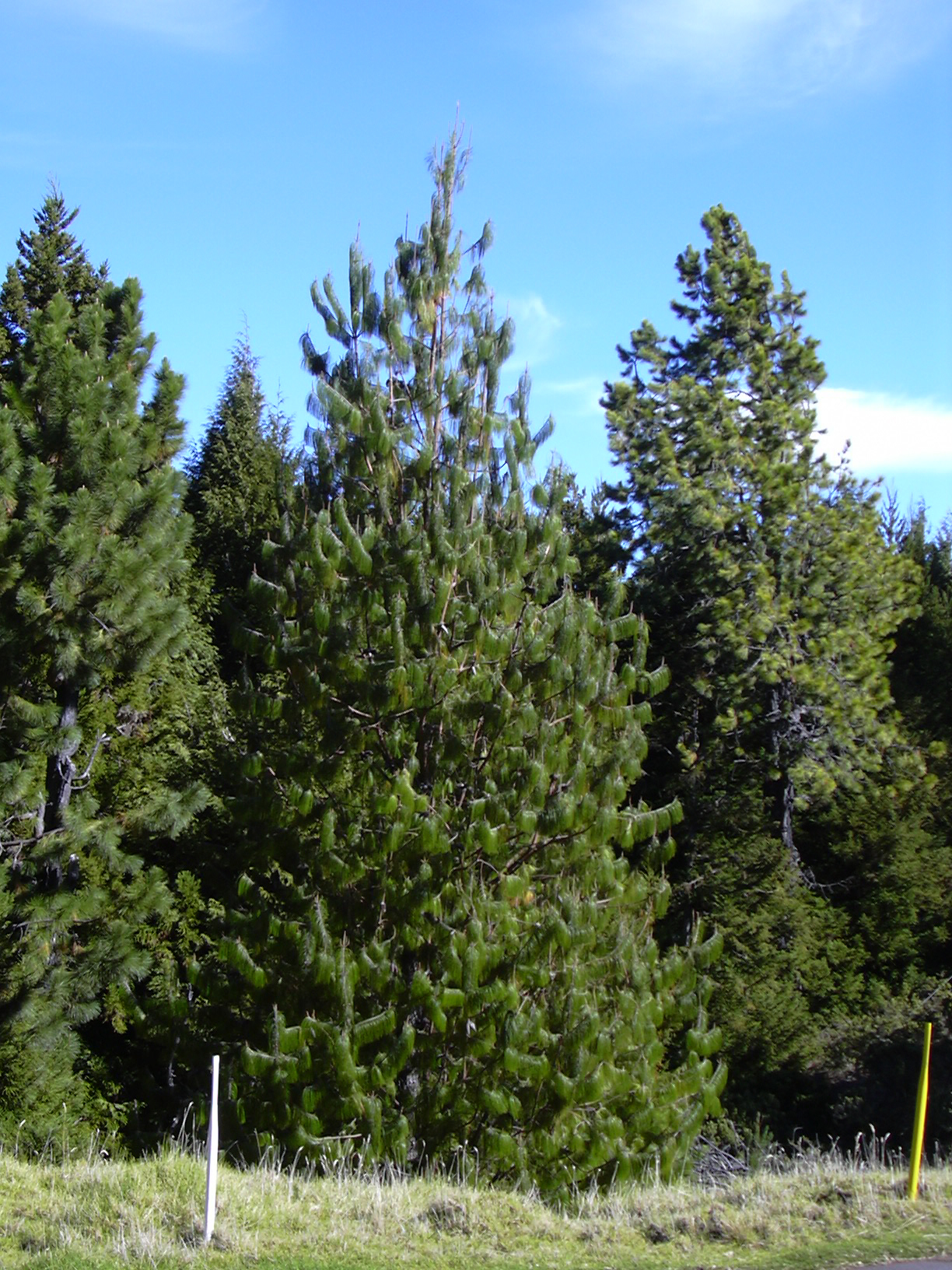
Pinus patula

Plagiotriptus pinivorus is highly polyphagous, feeding on a wide range of evergreen and semi-evergreen trees, shrubs and herbaceous plants. In Malawi in the 1960s it moved onto, and started feeding on, plantation crops of Pinus patula, completely defoliating the trees. Another somewhat smaller incident took place with the same species of pine in Tanzania in the 1980s.

In Malawi, this grasshopper has three generations in two years. Mating and egg-laying can take place at any time of year but usually peaks in May/June and late October/January. The male is much smaller than the female and clings onto one of her femurs while mating. The females may mate several times with different males, before moving to the ground to lay a clutch of eggs in a shallow pit. Other clutches are laid at intervals of a few weeks. The eggs take between 49 and 248 days to hatch, with an average of 115. The nymphs feed on terrestrial plants for the first few weeks before climbing trees to feed on the foliage. Males have six instars while females have seven, each stage lasting about seven weeks, but they both mature at about the same time.

There is a parasitic tachinid fly that attacks this grasshopper and there are a number of natural predators which feed on it, including skinks, blue monkeys and birds, but these were not sufficient to control the insects in the outbreak areas and sticky bands were wrapped around the tree trunks and insecticide was used on the ground at egg-laying sites.
