= Red Pine (disambiguation) =

Red pine or Norway pine, Pinus resinosa, is a pine tree native to North America.

Red Pine may also refer to:

== Trees ==
- Chinese red pine, two species
  - Pinus massoniana, Chinese red pine
  - Pinus tabuliformis, Southern Chinese red pine
- Pinus densiflora, Japanese red pine, a tree native to Japan and Korea
- Pinus taiwanensis, Taiwan red pine
- Pinus sylvestris, European red pine, Scots pine, etc.
- Dacrydium cupressinum, New Zealand red pine or rimu, a tree endemic to New Zealand
- Pinus brutia, Turkish pine, sometimes incorrectly translated from Turkish

== People ==
- Red Pine (author), the pen name of author Bill Porter, American author born 1943
- Chi Song or Master Red Pine (Chinese: 赤松), one of the legendary Taoist immortals
