= Eoseira =

Eoseira Temporal range: Ypresian

Scientific classification
- Domain: Eukaryota
- Clade: Sar
- Clade: Stramenopiles
- Division: Ochrophyta
- Clade: Bacillariophyta
- Class: Melosirophyceae
- Order: Melosirales
- Genus: †Eoseira; A.P.Wolfe & M.B.Edlund, 2005
- Species: †E. wilsonii

Binomial name
- †Eoseira wilsonii A.P.Wolfe & M.B.Edlund, 2005

Genus of extinct diatom

Eoseira is an extinct genus of diatoms belonging to the family Aulacoseiraceae and containing the single species Eoseira wilsonii. The species is dated to the Early Eocene Ypresian stage and has only been found at the type locality in east central British Columbia.

== Distribution ==
Eoseira wilsonii was an algal bloom forming diatom during the Early Eocene Climatic Optimum and one of the major lake components the Horsefly Shales lake system. The Horsefly shales have not been radiometrically dated, but based on shared floral and faunal taxa found in the other Early Eocene, Ypresian age, Okanagan Highlands sites, Horsefly is assumed to be contemporaneous.

== History and classification ==
Diatom fossils at Horsefly had been noted by Mark Wilson and Adrian Bogan (1994) who identified significant diatom volumes in the "summer varves" during study of a 6,375 year long stratigraphic section. Fossil material was studied subsequently by Alexander Wolfe and Mark Edlund (2005) with the type description of the species being published in the Canadian Journal of Earth Sciences. They designated three type specimens at the time of publication, the holotype "CANA 76143" and paratype "BCr; CANA 76144" which were both accessioned into the Canadian Museum of Nature at Ottawa, while the isotype was placed in the California Academy of Sciences Diatom Herbarium. Both the holotype and isotype were collected from the lower (H2) varve sequence exposed at the Horsefly mine locality. The paratype was collected at the nearby outcrops along the Black Creek Road. Wolfe and Edlund coined the specific epithet wilsonii as a patronym honoring Mark Wilson as recognition for his enormous work on western North American Eocene lake paleolimnology and paleoichthyology. They did not give an etymology for the genus name Eoseira.

E. wilsonii was placed into the family Aulacoseiraceae based on the numerous similarities to other members of the family, but placed into the monotypic new genus Eoseira due to a suite of distinctive features. Aulacoseiraceae is considered one of the first diatom families to transition from marine to freshwater habitats, sometime during the Cretaceous. The oldest genus of the family is Aulacoseira, from which Eoseira and other undescribed genera branched from in the Eocene, while a second diversification even took place in the Miocene resulting in the extinct genera Alveolophora, Miosira, and Pseudoaulacosira. E. wilsonii is suggested to be a sister branch to the aulacoseiroid lineages.

== Description ==
Eoseira wilsonii grew valve frustules with a cylindrical cross-section when viewed from the end, and a rectangular outline when viewed from the side. The individual valves formed linked filaments, with many individual frustules connected end to end by an interlinking collar of spines that arise from the face-side junction. The spines on a valve are spoon-shaped with a narrow base widening to an ovoid tip and dovetailing with the spines of the next valve. Each spine is smooth on the external surface and along the inner margins. The sides of the valves are stippled with straight rows of areolae oriented parallel to each other and perpendicular to the valve end faces. Unlike in Aulacoseira enlarged single or paired areolae groups do not form the linking or separation spines, rather the spines arise entirety separate from the areolae. Each of the areolae has a thin, porous silica layer, a vela, on the internal side of the opening. In contrast, as is seen in Aulacoseira, the valves of E. wilsonii develop a distinct ringleiste on the internal surface of the valves. Between the ringleist and valve junction are a number of sessile pore openings through the valve surface, called rimoportulae. The two halves of the valves are linked via girdle bands with connecting ligulate strands which developed parallel poroid rows oriented perpendicular to the valve ends.

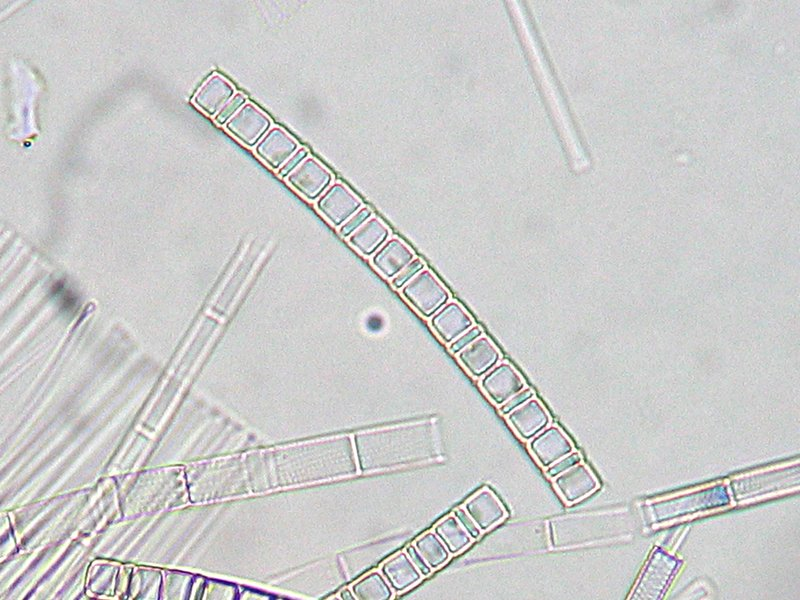
Aulacoseira granulata living filament

== Paleoecology ==
The polysaccharide slime grown by E. wilsonii is suggested to have enhanced the preservation quality of organisms which were coated by the slime films before entombment in the lake sediments. The horsefly lake system has been interpreted as monomictic to possibly meromictic. If the lake was monomictic, the lake waters would have one period of surface layer and deep water mixing a year, but if it was meromictic, the water layers did not have any annual periods of mixing. E. wilsonii is one of two diatoms known from Horsefly, with an undescribed species of Aulacoseira also being present. Unlike Aulacoseira giraffensis from the similarly aged Giraffe maar kimberlite pipe deposit in the North West Territories however, the undescribed Horsefly Aulacoseira species was a minor component of the lake flora, with E. wilsonii being the dominant bloom-forming species. Additionally the extant synurid "algae" species Mallomonas intermedia has also been recovered from Horsefly, while study of diatomitic sediments by George Mustoe (2005) from the McAbee Fossil Beds show undescribed Aulacoseiraceae diatoms and chrysophyte stomatocysts. Mustoe also examined sediment from the Allenby Formation near Princeton and found diatomitic layers, but noted that alteration and remineralization of the opal-A to opal-CT destroyed the original organic structures in the diatomite.

== Paleoenvironment ==
The greater Eocene Okanagan Highlands likely had a mesic upper microthermal to lower mesothermal climate, in which winter temperatures rarely dropped low enough for snow, and which were seasonably equitable. The Okanagan Highlands paleoforest surrounding the lakes have been described as precursors to the modern temperate broadleaf and mixed forests of Eastern North America and Eastern Asia. Based on the fossil biotas the lakes were higher and cooler then the coeval coastal forests preserved in the Puget Group and Chuckanut Formation of Western Washington, which are described as lowland tropical forest ecosystems. Estimates of the paleoelevation range between 0.7–1.2 km (0.43–0.75 mi) higher than the coastal forests. This is consistent with the paleoelevation estimates for the lake systems, which range between 1.1–2.9 km (1,100–2,900 m), which is similar to the modern elevation 0.8 km (0.50 mi), but higher. Estimates of the mean annual temperature have been derived from leaf margin analysis (LMA) of the Horsefly shales with the LMA returning a mean annual temperature of approximately 10.4 ± 2.2 °C (50.7 ± 4.0 °F). The estimated cold month mean temperature during the winter is placed at approximately 5.3 ± 2.8 °C (41.5 ± 5.0 °F). These estimates are lower than the mean annual temperature estimates given for the coastal Puget Group, which is estimated to have been between 15–18.6 °C (59.0–65.5 °F). The bioclimatic analysis for Horsefly suggests a mean annual precipitation amount of 105 ± 47 cm (41 ± 19 in).

The Okanagan Highlands fossil sites, which includes the Eocene formations between the Driftwood Shales near Smithers, British Columbia in the north and the Klondike Mountain Formation surrounding Republic, Washington to the south have been described collectively as one of the "Great Canadian Lagerstätten" based on the diversity, quality and unique nature of the biotas that are preserved. The highlands temperate biome preserved across such a large transect of lakes recorded many of the earliest appearances of modern genera, while also documenting the last stands of ancient lines. The warm temperate highland floras in association with downfaulted lacustrine basins and active volcanism are noted to have no exact modern equivalents. This is due to the more seasonally equitable conditions of the Early Eocene, resulting in much lower seasonal temperature shifts. However, the highlands have been compared to the upland ecological islands in the Virunga Mountains within the Albertine Rift of the African rift valley.
