= Morogoro pretty grasshopper =

Conservation status
- Critically endangered, possibly extinct (IUCN 3.1)

Scientific classification
- Domain: Eukaryota
- Kingdom: Animalia
- Phylum: Arthropoda
- Class: Insecta
- Order: Orthoptera
- Suborder: Caelifera
- Family: Thericleidae
- Genus: Acanthothericles
- Species: A. bicoloripes

Binomial name
- Acanthothericles bicoloripes Descamps, 1977

Species of grasshopper

The Morogoro pretty grasshopper (Acanthothericles bicoloripes) is a species of thericleid orthopteran that is endemic to lowland and submontane rainforests around Morogoro in Tanzania. It has not been recorded since 1939 and is possibly extinct. If it is still extant, it is threatened by deforestation and conversion to agricultural land.
