= Erianthus =

Erianthus is a generic name that may refer to:

- Erianthus (insect), a genus of grasshoppers in the family Chorotypidae
- Erianthus (plant), a genus of grasses in the family Poaceae
