= Stenerianthus =

Stenerianthus annamensis

Scientific classification
- Domain: Eukaryota
- Kingdom: Animalia
- Phylum: Arthropoda
- Class: Insecta
- Order: Orthoptera
- Suborder: Caelifera
- Family: Chorotypidae
- Subfamily: Erianthinae
- Genus: Stenerianthus; Descamps, 1975
- Species: S. annamensis

Binomial name
- Stenerianthus annamensis Descamps, 1975

Synonyms
- Sterianthus Yin, Shi & Yin, 1996

Genus of grasshoppers

Stenerianthus annamensis is a species of grasshopper in the monotypic genus Stenerianthus. It is in the family Chorotypidae, subfamily Erianthinae. This "monkey grasshopper" was discovered in central Vietnam, with the type locality identified as "Lien Chien" near Da Nang.
