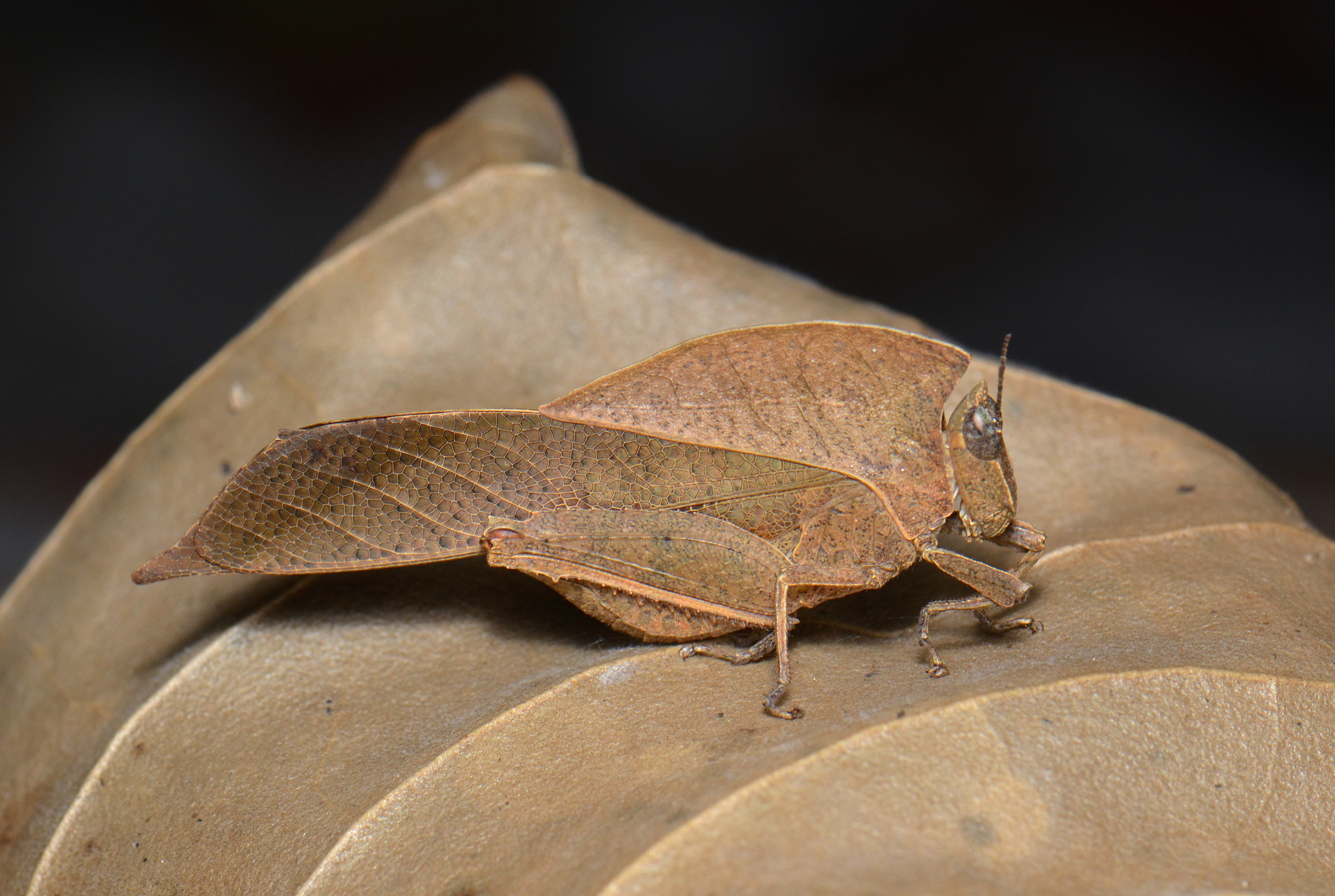

Scientific classification
- Kingdom: Animalia
- Phylum: Arthropoda
- Class: Insecta
- Order: Orthoptera
- Suborder: Caelifera
- Family: Chorotypidae
- Subfamily: Chorotypinae
- Tribe: Chorotypini
- Genus: Chorotypus; Serville, 1838

Synonyms
- Choroetypus Burmeister, 1840

= Chorotypus =

Genus of grasshoppers

Chorotypus is a genus of Asian grasshoppers in the family Chorotypidae; species can be found in: India, Indochina and Malaysia.

== Species ==
The Orthoptera Species File lists:

1. Chorotypus ameliae Bolívar, 1930 — northern Borneo
2. Chorotypus biemarginatus Brunner von Wattenwyl, 1898 — Java
3. Chorotypus brunneri Kirby, 1910 — northern Borneo
4. Chorotypus fenestratus Serville, 1838 - type species — India
5. Chorotypus haani Brunner von Wattenwyl, 1898 — southern Kalimantan
6. Chorotypus pusillus Brunner von Wattenwyl, 1898 — Java
7. Chorotypus saussurei Bolívar, 1930 — Peninsular Malaysia (Perak)
8. Chorotypus servillei Bolívar, 1930 — northern Borneo
9. Chorotypus vietnamensis Storozhenko, 2017 — Vietnam
