= Butania =

Scientific classification
- Domain: Eukaryota
- Kingdom: Animalia
- Phylum: Arthropoda
- Class: Insecta
- Order: Orthoptera
- Suborder: Caelifera
- Family: Chorotypidae
- Subfamily: Erianthinae
- Genus: Butania; Bolívar, 1903

Type species
- Bennia oberthuri Bolívar, 1914

Genus of grasshoppers

Butania is a genus of Asian grasshoppers in the family Chorotypidae.

== Species ==
As of 2018, species include:

- Butania lugubris (Brunner von Wattenwyl, 1898)
- Butania metallica Ingrisch, 1987
