= Acanthothericles =

Scientific classification
- Domain: Eukaryota
- Kingdom: Animalia
- Phylum: Arthropoda
- Class: Insecta
- Order: Orthoptera
- Suborder: Caelifera
- Family: Thericleidae
- Subfamily: Chromothericleinae
- Genus: Acanthothericles; Descamps, 1977

Species
- Acanthothericles bicoloripes; Acanthothericles rubriventris

Genus of grasshoppers

Acanthothericles is a genus of thericleid orthopteran. It includes the following species:

- Acanthothericles bicoloripes Descamps, 1977 — Morogoro pretty grasshopper
- Acanthothericles rubriventris Descamps, 1977

Both species are found in Tanzania.
