= Mastacideidae =

Scientific classification
- Kingdom: Animalia
- Phylum: Arthropoda
- Class: Insecta
- Order: Orthoptera
- Suborder: Caelifera
- Superfamily: Eumastacoidea
- Family: Mastacideidae; Rehn, 1948

Family of grasshoppers

Mastacideidae is a family of grasshoppers in the order Orthoptera. There are at least two genera and about eight described species in Mastacideidae, found in South Asia.

== Genera ==
These two genera belong to the family Mastacideidae:

- Mastacides Bolívar, 1899
- Paramastacides Descamps, 1974
