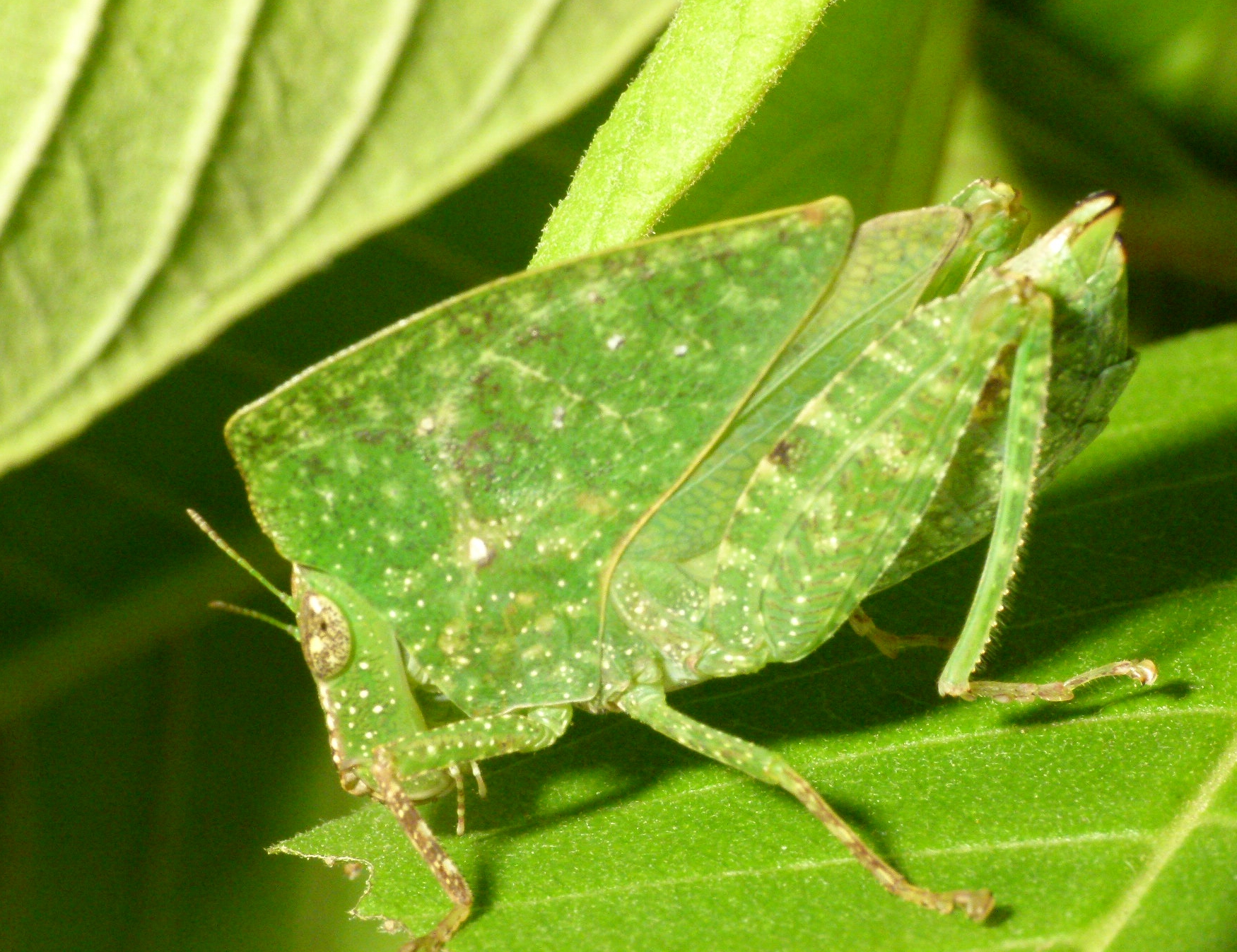
- Phyllochoreia ramakrishnai (female)

Scientific classification
- Kingdom: Animalia
- Phylum: Arthropoda
- Class: Insecta
- Order: Orthoptera
- Suborder: Caelifera
- Family: Chorotypidae
- Tribe: Chorotypini
- Genus: Phyllochoreia; Westwood, 1839

Type species
- Phyllochoreia unicolor Westwood, 1839

= Phyllochoreia =

Genus of grasshoppers

Phyllochoreia is a genus of grasshopper endemic to the Western Ghats of India and Sri Lanka. It is in the family Chorotypidae of the superfamily Eumastacoidea.

== Species ==
The Orthoptera Species File includes:

1. Phyllochoreia equa Burr, 1899
2. Phyllochoreia ramakrishnai Bolívar, 1914
3. Phyllochoreia unicolor Westwood, 1839
4. Phyllochoreia westwoodi Bolívar, 1930

A female specimen of Phyllochoria westwoodi Bolívar was designated as a holotype. It was collected from Coonoor in the Nilgiri district, Tamil Nadu, India, located in the tropical region of Asia within the Indian Subcontinent. The holotype is housed at the Natural History Museum in London (BMNH).

The holotype specimen of Phyllochoria ramakrishnai Bolívar is a male from Kollur Ghat, located in Udupi District, Karnataka, India. The specimen is preserved in the T. V. Ramakrishna Ayyar collection. Within India, its distribution also includes Kerala. This species was named by Bolívar in 1914 after collector.

The type specimen of Phyllochoria unicolor Westwood is a female from the Malabar Region in Kerala, India. The specimen is preserved at the University Museum of Natural History in Oxford, United Kingdom.
