= Odontomastax =

Scientific classification
- Domain: Eukaryota
- Kingdom: Animalia
- Phylum: Arthropoda
- Class: Insecta
- Order: Orthoptera
- Suborder: Caelifera
- Family: Chorotypidae
- Genus: Odontomastax; Bolívar, 1944

Genus of insects

Odontomastax is a genus of grasshoppers belonging to the family Chorotypidae. It contains a single species, Odontomastax poultoni (Bolívar, 1931) from Borneo.
