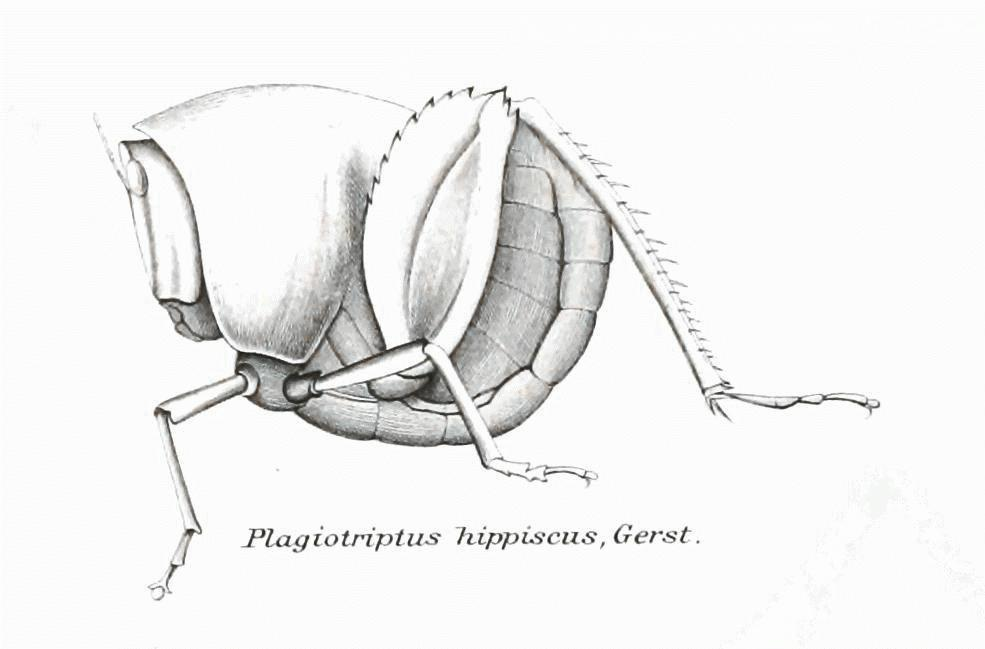
- Plagiotriptus hippiscus

Scientific classification
- Domain: Eukaryota
- Kingdom: Animalia
- Phylum: Arthropoda
- Class: Insecta
- Order: Orthoptera
- Suborder: Caelifera
- Family: Thericleidae
- Subfamily: Plagiotriptinae
- Genus: Plagiotriptus; Karsch, 1889

Species
- See text

= Plagiotriptus =

Genus of grasshoppers

Plagiotriptus is a type of grasshopper of genus of thericleid orthopterans. It includes the following species:

- Plagiotriptus alca
- Plagiotriptus carli
- Plagiotriptus hippiscus
- Plagiotriptus leei
- Plagiotriptus loricatus
- Plagiotriptus parvulus
- Plagiotriptus peterseni
- Plagiotriptus pinivorus
- Plagiotriptus somalicus
