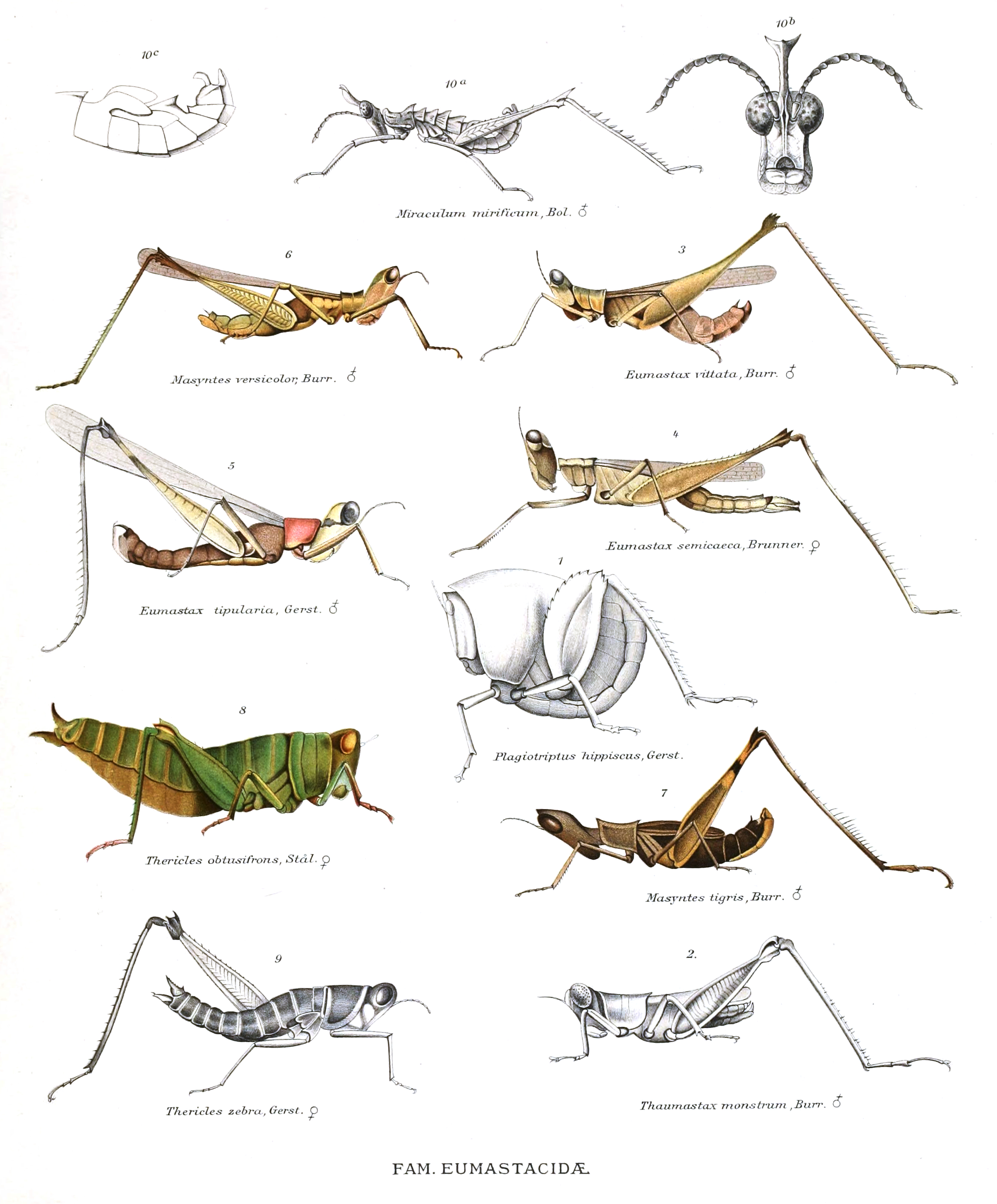
- Some eumastacoids

Scientific classification
- Kingdom: Animalia
- Phylum: Arthropoda
- Class: Insecta
- Order: Orthoptera
- Suborder: Caelifera
- Nanorder: Acridomorpha
- Superfamily: Eumastacoidea; Burr, 1899

Families
- See text

= Eumastacoidea =

Superfamily of grasshoppers

Eumastacoidea is a superfamily within the order Orthoptera, suborder Caelifera. The family has a mainly tropical distribution and has sometimes been called "monkey grasshoppers".

== Description ==
Some of the characters of the members of the superfamily are the lack of an abdominal tympanum, wings if present widen towards the tip, the antennae are short in some groups the hindlegs are spread out laterally at rest.

== Families ==
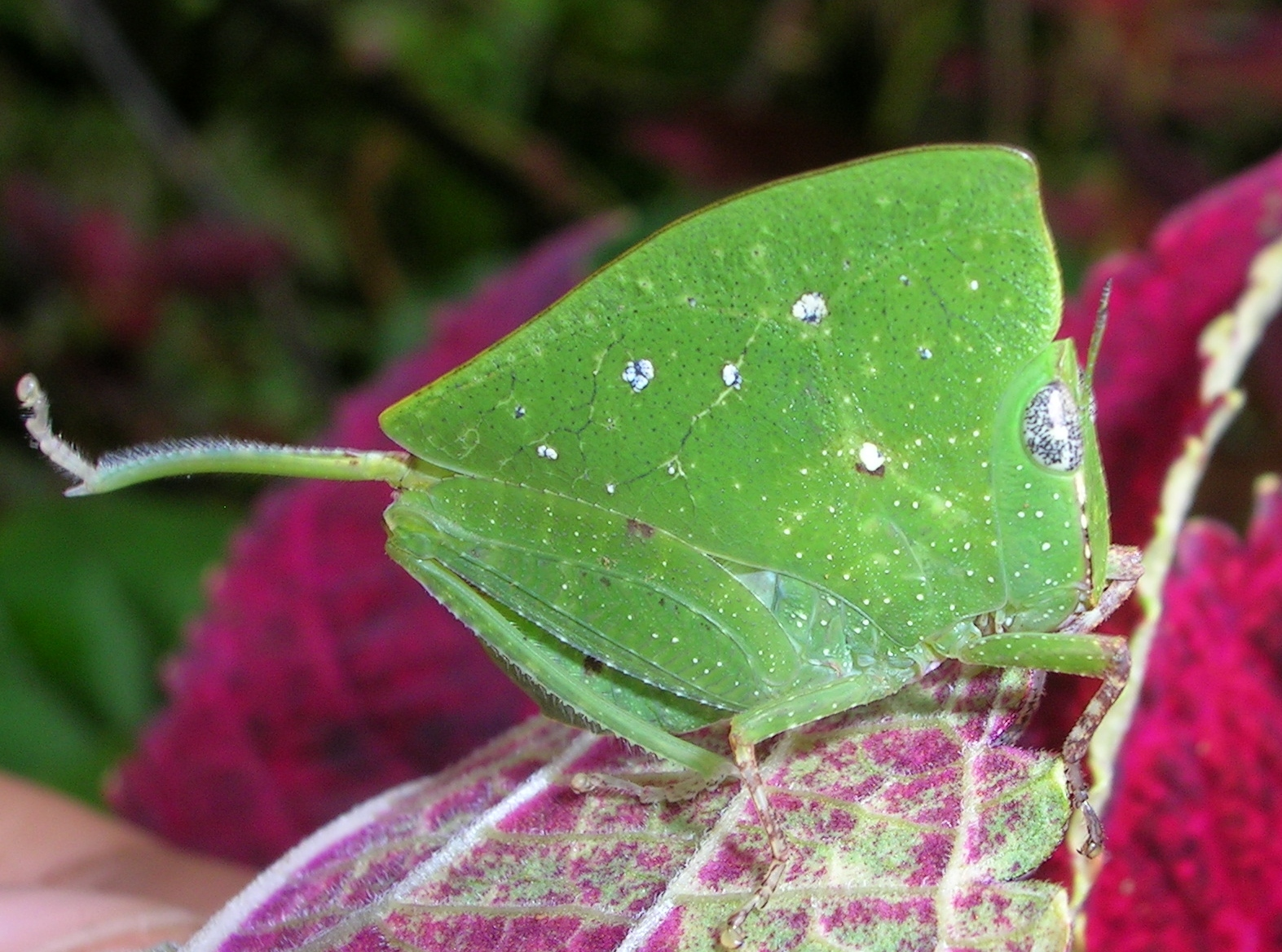
Family Chorotypidae Phyllochoreia ramakrishnai Wayanad Wildlife Sanctuary

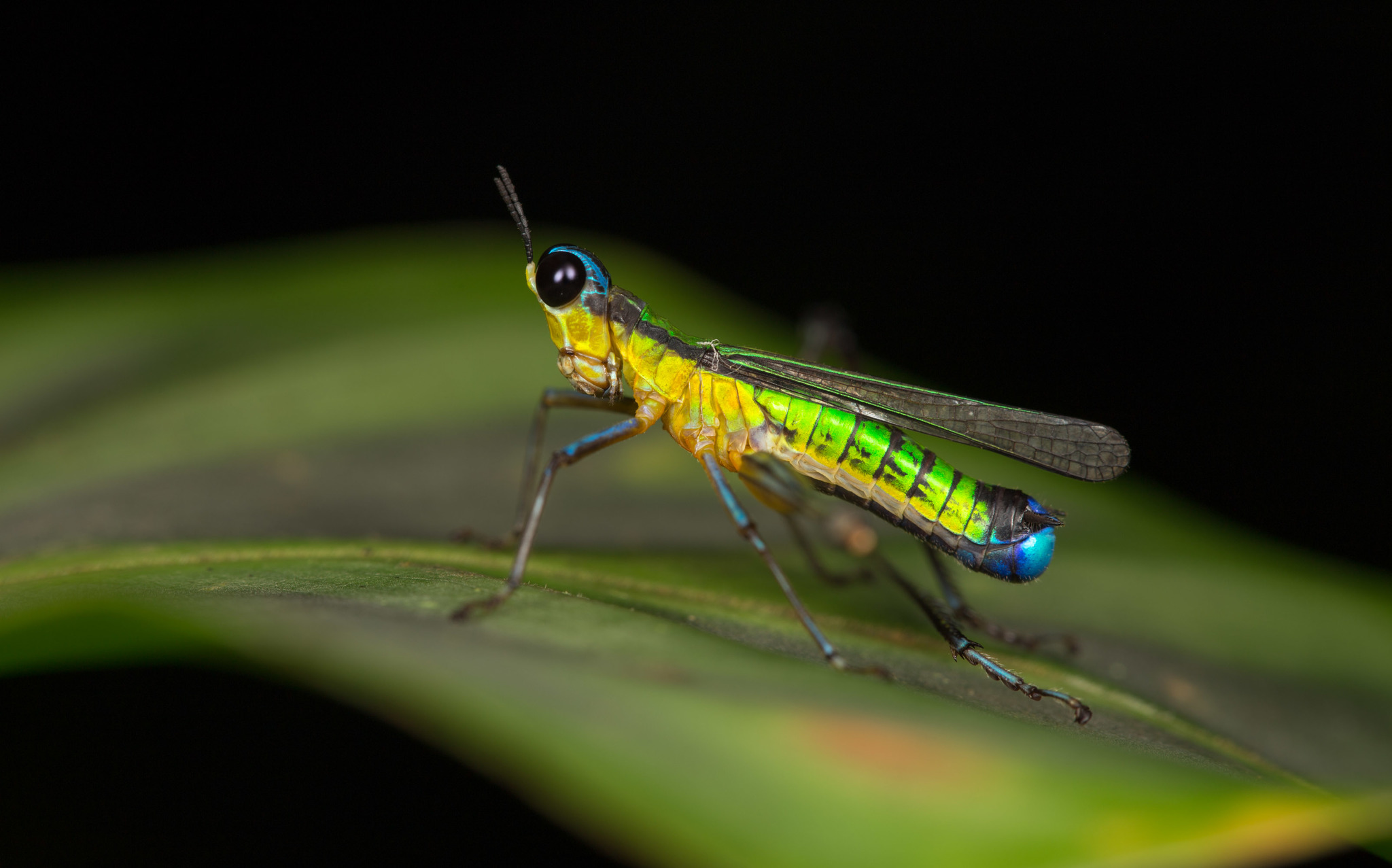
Family Eumastacidae Eumastax zumuniana near Tena, Ecuador

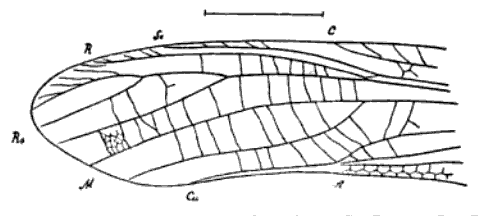
Family †Promastacidae Promastax archaicus 1910 illustration of fossil

The overall classification based on characteristics of the genitalia and the geographic distribution of family groups are as follows:

- Family Chorotypidae Stål, 1873
  - Subfamily Chininae Burr, 1903
  - Subfamily Chorotypinae (Burr, 1903)
  - Subfamily Erianthinae (Burr, 1903)
  - Subfamily Eruciinae Burr, 1903
  - Subfamily Mnesicleinae Descamps, 1973
  - Subfamily Prionacanthinae Descamps 1973
- Family Episactidae Burr, 1899
  - Subfamily Episactinae Burr, 1903
  - Subfamily Espagnolinae Rehn, 1948
  - Subfamily Miraculinae I. Bolivar, 1903
- Family EumastacidaeBurr, 1899
  - Subfamily Eumastacinae Burr, 1903
  - Subfamily Gomphomastacinae Burr, 1903
  - Subfamily Masynteinae Descamps, 1973
  - Subfamily Morseinae Rehn, 1948
  - Subfamily Paramastacinae Dirsh, 1961
  - Subfamily Parepisactinae Dirsh, 1975
  - Subfamily Pseudomastacinae Dirsh, 1961
  - Subfamily Temnomastacinae (Rehn, 1948)
- Family EuschmidtiidaeRehn, 1948
  - Subfamily Euschmidtiinae Rehn, 1948
  - Subfamily Pseudoschmidtiinae Descamps, 1964
  - Subfamily Stenoschmidtiinae Descamps, 1973
- Family Mastacideidae Rehn, 1948
  - Subfamily Mastacideinae Rehn, 1948
- Family Morabidae Rehn, 1948
  - Monotypic subfamily Biroellinae C. Bolivar, 1930
    - genus Biroella C. Bolívar, 1903
  - Subfamily Morabinae Rehn, 1948
- Family †Promastacidae Kevan & Wighton, 1981
  - Genus †Promastax Handlirsch, 1910
- Family Thericleidae Burr, 1899
  - Subfamily Afromastacinae Descamps, 1977
  - Subfamily Barythericleinae Descamps, 1977
  - Subfamily Chromothericleinae Descamps, 1977
  - Subfamily Loxicephalinae Descamps, 1977
  - Subfamily Plagiotriptinae Bolívar, 1914
  - Subfamily Thericleinae Burr, 1899

The genus †Promastacoides was originally considered a privative Eumastacoidea taxon by Kevan and& Wighton (1981), subsequent authors have consistently found it to be a Susumaniidae stick insect.
