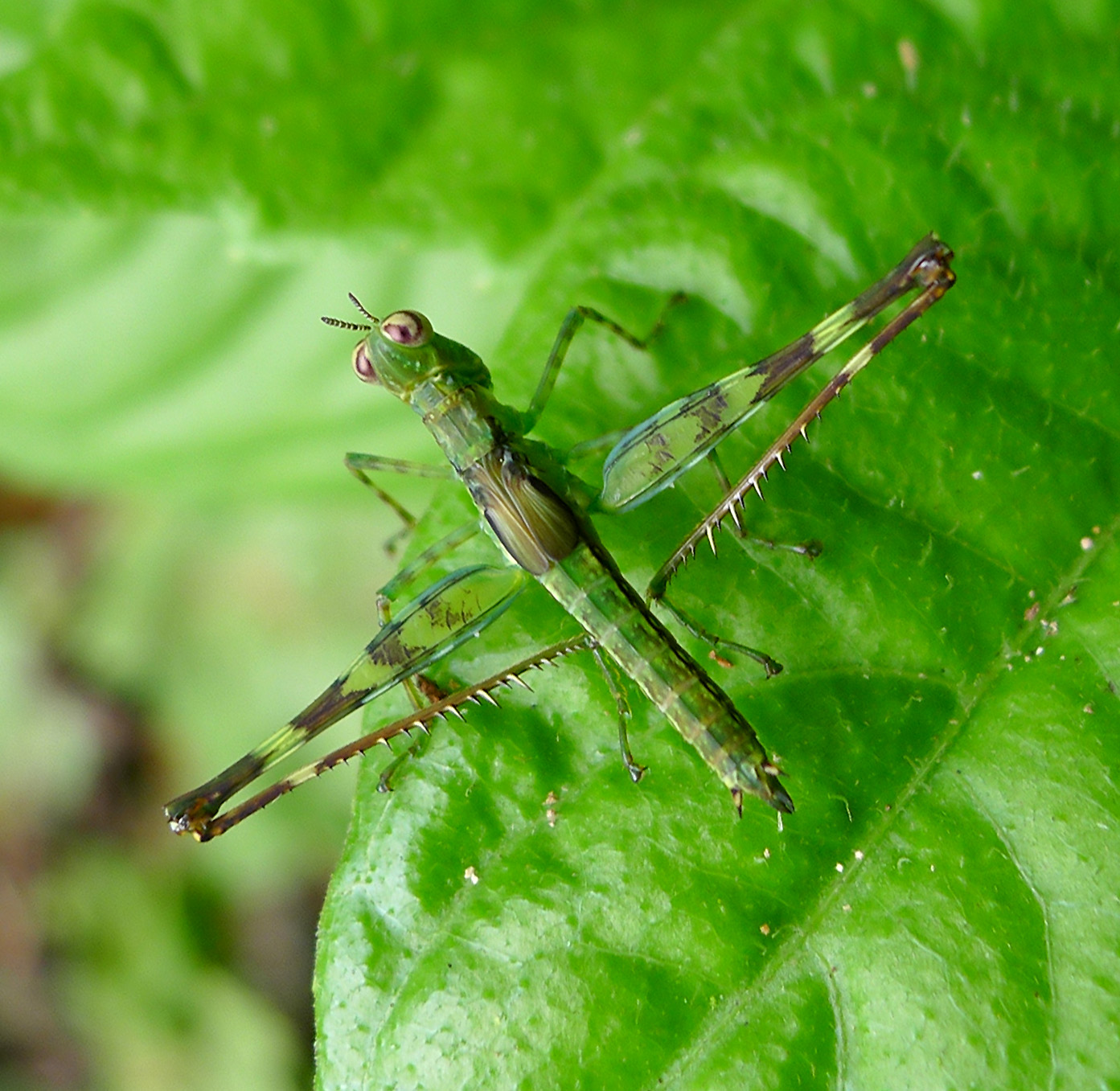
- Monkey hopper, Costa Rica

Scientific classification
- Kingdom: Animalia
- Phylum: Arthropoda
- Class: Insecta
- Order: Orthoptera
- Suborder: Caelifera
- Superfamily: Eumastacoidea
- Family: Episactidae; Burr, 1899

= Episactidae =

Family of grasshoppers

Episactidae is a family of grasshoppers in the order Orthoptera. There are about 19 genera and more than 60 described species in the family Episactidae, and are found in Central and South America, China, and Madagascar.

== Genera ==
These 19 genera belong to the family Episactidae:

- Acronomastax Descamps, 1965
- Antillacris Rehn & Rehn, 1939
- Episactus Burr, 1899
- Espagnola Rehn & Rehn, 1939
- Espagnoleta Perez-Gelabert, 2000
- Espagnolopsis Perez-Gelabert, Hierro & Otte, 1997
- Gymnotettix Bruner, 1901
- Heteromastax Descamps, 1965
- Lethus Rehn & Rehn, 1934
- Malagassa Saussure, 1903
- Neibamastax Rowell & Perez-Gelabert, 2006
- Paralethus Rowell & Perez-Gelabert, 2006
- Pielomastax Chang, 1937
- Rhabdomastax Descamps, 1969
- Seyrigella Chopard, 1951
- Tainacris Perez-Gelabert, Hierro, Dominici & Otte, 1997
- Teicophrys Bruner, 1901
- † Miraculum Bolívar, 1903
- † Paleomastacris Perez-Gelabert, Hierro, Dominici & Otte, 1997
