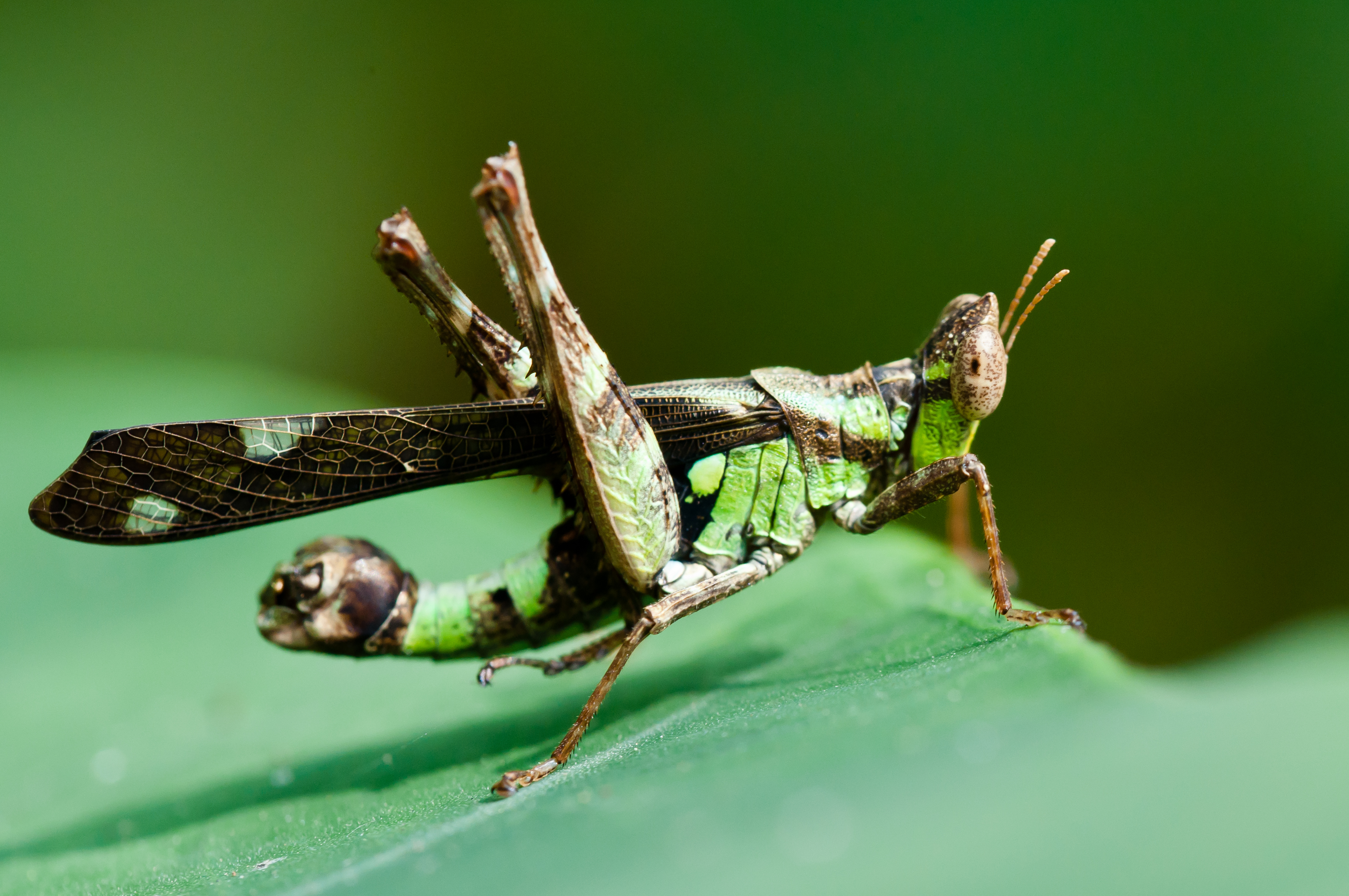
- Erianthus versicolor, Spot monkey grasshopper

Scientific classification
- Domain: Eukaryota
- Kingdom: Animalia
- Phylum: Arthropoda
- Class: Insecta
- Order: Orthoptera
- Suborder: Caelifera
- Superfamily: Eumastacoidea
- Family: Chorotypidae
- Subfamily: Erianthinae; Karsch, 1889

Synonyms
- Erianthi, Erianthina, Erianthini Karsch, 1889

= Erianthinae =

Subfamily of grasshoppers

The Erianthinae are a subfamily of Asian grasshoppers in the family Chorotypidae and based on the type genus Erianthus. There are currently 12 genera and more than 40 described species recorded from southern China, Japan, Indo-China and Malesia.

== Genera ==
These 12 genera belong to the subfamily Erianthinae:

- Bennia Burr, 1899
- Bornerianthus Descamps, 1975
- Butania Bolívar, 1903
- Erianthella Descamps, 1975
- Erianthina Descamps, 1975
- Erianthus Stål, 1875
- Khaserianthus Descamps, 1975
- Macroerianthus Descamps, 1975
- Pieltainerianthus Descamps, 1975
- Pseuderianthus Descamps, 1975
- Stenerianthus Descamps, 1975
- Xenerianthus Descamps, 1975
