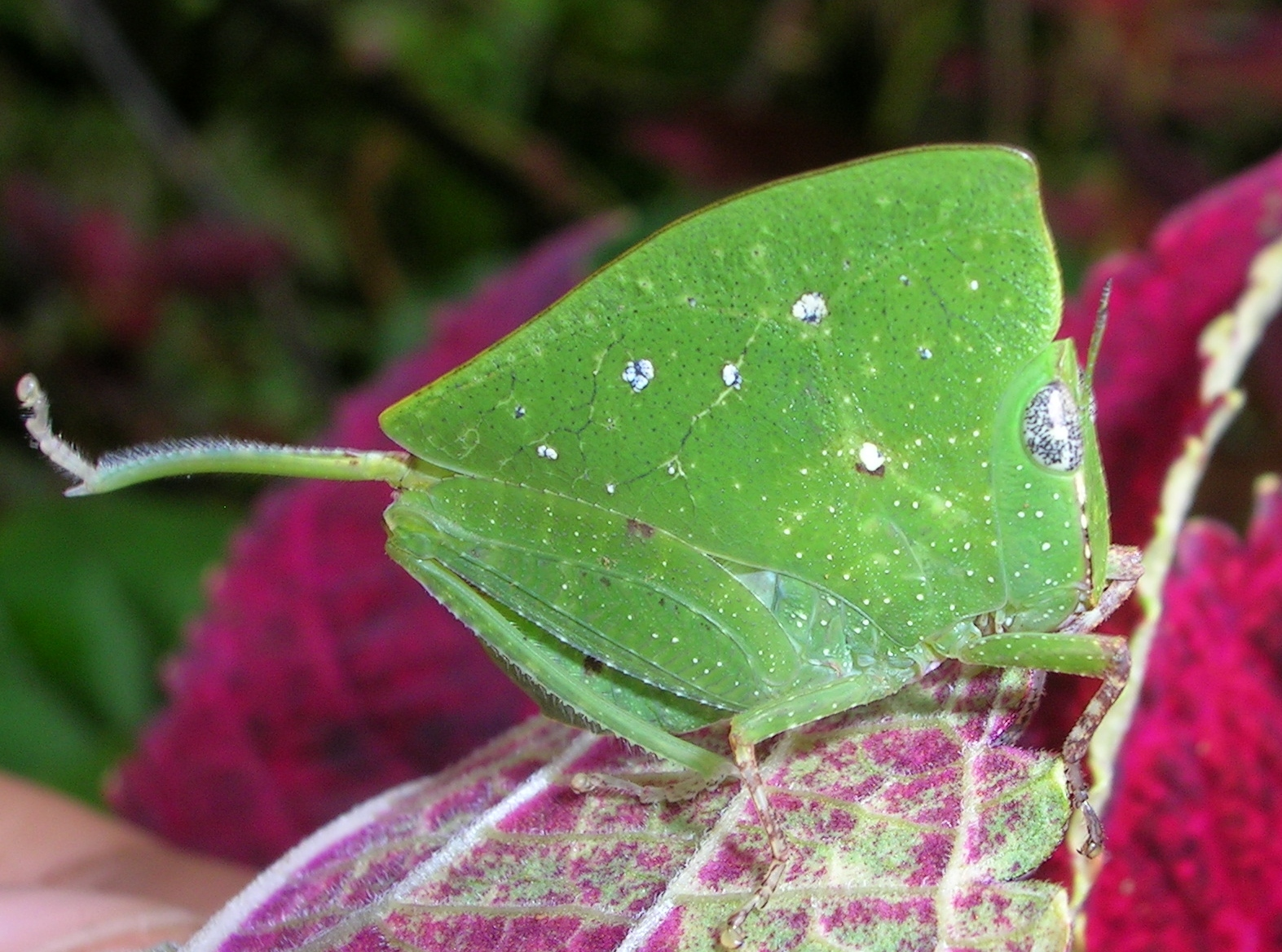
- Phyllochoreia ramakrishnai

Scientific classification
- Domain: Eukaryota
- Kingdom: Animalia
- Phylum: Arthropoda
- Class: Insecta
- Order: Orthoptera
- Suborder: Caelifera
- Superfamily: Eumastacoidea
- Family: Chorotypidae
- Subfamily: Chorotypinae; Stål, 1873

Synonyms
- Choroetypidae, Choroetypiden Stål, 1873

= Chorotypinae =

Subfamily of grasshoppers

Chorotypinae is a subfamily of grasshoppers in the family Chorotypidae. There are currently more than 30 described species in Chorotypinae, found in Africa and Asia

== Genera ==
These genera belong to the subfamily Chorotypinae:

tribe Chorotypini Stål, 1873

1. Burrinia Bolívar, 1930
2. Chorotypus Serville, 1838
3. Hemierianthus Saussure, 1903
4. Orchetypus Brunner von Wattenwyl, 1898
5. Phyllochoreia Westwood, 1839
6. Pseudorchetypus Descamps, 1974
7. Scirtotypus Brunner von Wattenwyl, 1898

incertae sedis

- Xiphicera Lamarck, 1817 - monotypic X. gallinacea (Fabricius, 1793)
