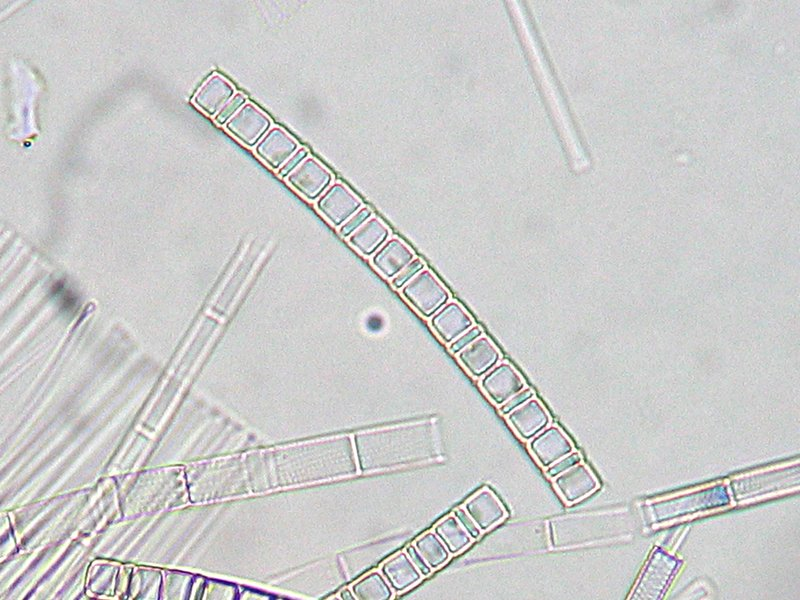
- Aulacoseira granulata

Scientific classification
- Domain: Eukaryota
- Clade: Diaphoretickes
- Clade: SAR
- Clade: Stramenopiles
- Phylum: Gyrista
- Subphylum: Ochrophytina
- Class: Bacillariophyceae
- Subclass: Coscinodiscophycidae
- Superorder: Coscinodiscanae
- Order: Aulacoseirales; R.M.Crawford, 1990
- Family: Aulacoseiraceae; R.M.Crawford, 1990

= Aulacoseiraceae =

Family of algae

Aulacoseirales is an order of diatoms belonging to the class Bacillariophyceae. The order consists only one family: Aulacoseiraceae.

== Genera ==
Genera:

- Alveolophora A.I.Moisseeva & T.L.Nevretdinova, 1990
- Aulacoseira G.H.K.Thwaites, 1848
- †Eoseira A.P.Wolfe & M.B.Edlund, 2005
- Pseudoaulacosira G.Lupikina & G.K.Khursevich, 1991
- Strangulonema R.K.Greville, 1865
