= Chininae =

Scientific classification
- Domain: Eukaryota
- Kingdom: Animalia
- Phylum: Arthropoda
- Class: Insecta
- Order: Orthoptera
- Suborder: Caelifera
- Family: Chorotypidae
- Subfamily: Chininae; Burr, 1899

Synonyms
- Chinae Burr, 1899; Chinini Burr, 1899

Subfamily of grasshoppers

Chininae is a subfamily of Asian grasshoppers in the family Chorotypidae based on the type genus China. There are currently two known genera and about nine described species, found in southern China and Southeast Asia. The subfamily was first formally erected in 1899.

== Genera ==
These two genera belong to the subfamily Chininae:

- China Burr, 1899 - monotypic China mantispoides from China and Indochina
- Eupatrides Brunner von Wattenwyl, 1898 - Malesia
