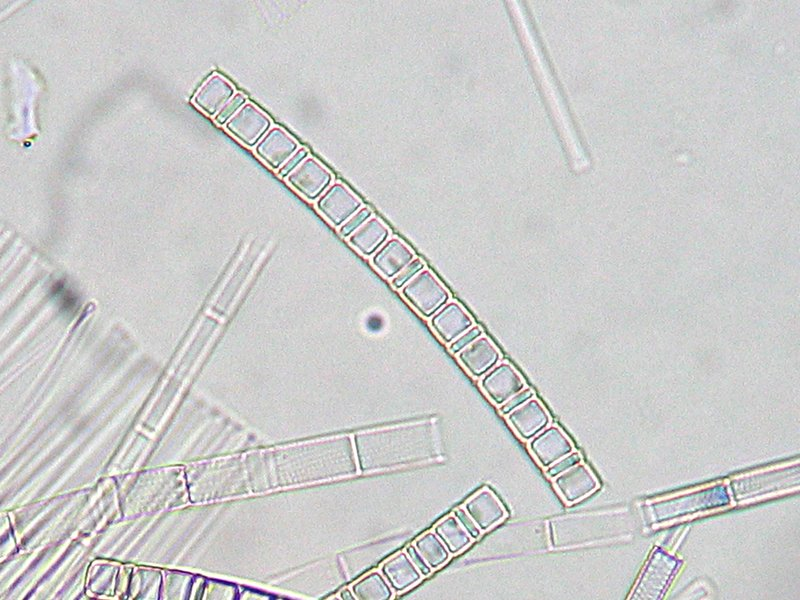
- Aulacoseira granulata

Scientific classification
- Domain: Eukaryota
- Supergroup: Stramenopiles
- Division: Ochrophyta
- Clade: Bacillariophyta
- Class: Melosirophyceae
- Order: Melosirales
- Family: Melosiraceae
- Genus: Aulacoseira; G.H.K.Thwaites, 1848

= Aulacoseira =

Genus of algae

Aulacoseira is a genus of diatoms belonging to the family Aulacoseiraceae.

The genus has cosmopolitan distribution.

Species:

- Aulacoseira accincta (Hohn & Hellerman) Simonsen
- Aulacoseira acicularia Danuta Bennett & Kociolek
- Aulacoseira aculeifera (Sheshukova-Poretskaya) Simonsen
- Aulacoseira agassizii (Ostenfeld) Simonsen
- Aulacoseira akitaensis H.Tanaka
- Aulacoseira alpigena (Grunow) Krammer
- Aulacoseira ambigua (Grunow) Simonsen
- Aulacoseira areolata Moiseyeva
- Aulacoseira argus (O.Müller) Simonsen
- Aulacoseira atlymica (N.V.Rubina) Moisseeva
- Aulacoseira baicalensis (K.I.Meyer) Simonsen
- Aulacoseira biseriata (Grunow) Houk, Klee & H.Tanaka
- Aulacoseira brasiliensis P.I.Tremarin, L.Carvalho Torgan & T.A.Veiga Ludwig
- Aulacoseira californica (Ehrenberg) Houk
- Tremarin, Torgan & Ludwig
- Aulacoseira camusii (Héribaud) Simonsen
- Aulacoseira canadensis (Hustedt) Simonsen
- Aulacoseira canalifera (Brun & Héribaud) Simonsen
- Aulacoseira ceretana E.Y.Haworth & Sabater
- Aulacoseira chockii Siver
- Aulacoseira chukotkaensis Genkal
- Aulacoseira clarensis M.E.Benson & Kociolek
- Aulacoseira coroniformis Pearce & Cremer
- Aulacoseira crassipunctata Krammer
- Aulacoseira crenulata (Ehrenberg) Thwaites
- Houk, Klee & H.Tanaka
- Aulacoseira delicatula Kociolek
- Aulacoseira dianchiensis J.R.Yang, Stoermer & Kociolek
- Aulacoseira distans (Ehrenberg) Simonsen
- Aulacoseira elegans (Mukhina) Simonsen
- Aulacoseira elliptica Tsoy
- Aulacoseira euareolata K.Shinohara, A.Maruyama, B.Rusuwa & T.Ohtsuka
- Aulacoseira excurrens (Nygaard) Simonsen
- Aulacoseira fennoscandica (A.Cleve) R.Ross
- Aulacoseira frenguelliana Casa & Van de Vijver
- Aulacoseira fuegiana (Frenguelli) Casa, López Bedogni & Van de Vijver
- Aulacoseira fukushimae H.Tanaka
- Aulacoseira gadebensis Mohan & Stone
- Aulacoseira gessneri (Hustedt) Simonsen
- Siver, A.P.Wolfe & M.B.Edlund
- Aulacoseira glubokoyensis Oaquim, Moser, Evangelista & Van de Vijver
- Aulacoseira goetzeana (O.Müller) Simonsen
- Aulacoseira granulata (Ehrenberg) Simonsen
- Aulacoseira haruoi Mohan & Stone
- Aulacoseira helianthus Mohan & Stone
- Aulacoseira helvetica (Hustedt) Houk, Klee & H.Tanaka
- Aulacoseira herzogii (Lemmermann) Simonsen
- Aulacoseira hibschii (Reichelt) Houk
- Aulacoseira houkii H.Tanaka
- W.He, P.Rioual & L.Wang
- (A.Cleve) Genkal & Trifonova
- Aulacoseira ikapoensis (O.Müller) Simonsen
- Siver, Kling & Hamilton
- Aulacoseira inordinata (Lohman & G.W.Andrews) Simonsen
- Aulacoseira interrupta (Lohman & G.W.Andrews) Simonsen
- Aulacoseira islandica (O.Müller) Simonsen
- Aulacoseira italica (Ehrenberg) Simonsen
- Aulacoseira iwakiensis H.Tanaka
- Aulacoseira javanica (Grunow) Houk, Klee & H.Tanaka
- Aulacoseira jeremiae (Grunow) Houk, Klee & Passauer
- Aulacoseira jewsonii Mohan & Stone
- Aulacoseira jonensis (Grunow) Houk & Klee
- Aulacoseira karelica (Mölder) Simonsen
- Aulacoseira khankaica Avramenko & Cherepanova
- Aulacoseira kondeensis (O.Müller) Simonsen
- Aulacoseira krammeri R.K.Edgar, Kociolek & S.M.Edgar
- E.Morales, S.F.Riviera & Houk
- Aulacoseira krylovii Glushchenko, Genkal & Kulikovskiy
- Aulacoseira lacustris (Grunow) Krammer
- Aulacoseira laevissima (Grunow) Krammer
- Aulacoseira lancea Siver & Hamilton
- Aulacoseira lapilla I.W.Bishop & Spaulding
- Aulacoseira lauquenensis M.L.García, J.M.Guerrero, Tremarin, Maidana & E.Morales
- Aulacoseira limbata Tudesque & Chrea
- Aulacoseira lirata (Ehrenberg) R.Ross
- Aulacoseira liucoensis M.L.García, J.M.Guerrero, Tremarin, Maidana & E.Morales
- Aulacoseira lohmanii Siver
- Aulacoseira magnusii (O.Müller) Simonsen
- Aulacoseira makarovae Genkal & Trifonova
- Aulacoseira mbasiensis (O.Müller) Simonsen
- Aulacoseira micropunctata Tudesque, Le Cohu & Van de Vijver
- Aulacoseira minuscula P.I.Tremarin, L.C.Torgan & T.A.V.Ludwig
- Aulacoseira miosiris H.Tanaka
- Aulacoseira mocsarensis (Pantocsek) V.Houk & R.Klee
- Aulacoseira monospina (Gassé) Kociolek & Khursevich
- Aulacoseira moralesii Siver
- Aulacoseira multistriata (R.M.Patrick) Houk, Klee & H.Tanaka
- Aulacoseira muzzanensis (F.Meister) Krammer
- Aulacoseira newjerseyana Enache, Potapova, Polaskey & Spaulding
- Aulacoseira nipponica (Skvortzov) A.Tuji
- (W.Smith) J.English & Potapova
- Aulacoseira nivaloides (K.E.Camburn) J.English & M.Potapova
- Aulacoseira nyassensis (O.Müller) Simonsen
- Aulacoseira nygaardii (Camburn) Camburn & Charles
- Siver & P.B.Hamilton
- Houk, Klee & Marvan
- Aulacoseira ovata Usoltseva & Tsoy
- Aulacoseira pantanalensis Tremarin, Torgan & V.Ludwig
- Aulacoseira papilio (Mukhina) Simonsen
- Aulacoseira pardata J.English & M.Potapova
- Aulacoseira patagonica (O.Müller) Simonsen
- Aulacoseira paucistriata J.P.Bradbury
- Aulacoseira pella (K.E.Lohman & G.W.Andrews) Simonsen
- Aulacoseira pensacolae (A.W.F.Schmidt) Houk, R.Klee & H.Tanaka
- Aulacoseira perglabra (Østrup) E.Y.Haworth
- Aulacoseira periphytica E.Novelo, Tavera & C.Ibarra
- Aulacoseira pfaffiana (Reinsch) Krammer
- Aulacoseira polispina H.Tanaka
- Aulacoseira ponderosa Siver
- Aulacoseira praegranulata (Jousé) Simonsen
- Aulacoseira praeislandica (Jousé) Simonsen
- Aulacoseira principissa Van de Vijver
- Aulacoseira procera (Ehrenberg) Houk & Klee
- Aulacoseira pseudoamericana (Camburn) Siver & Kling
- Aulacoseira pseudogranulata (A.Cleve) Simonsen
- Aulacoseira pseudoislandica Lupikina & Ozornina
- Aulacoseira pseudomuzzanensis Olszynski & Zelazna-Wieczorek
- Aulacoseira pusilla (F.Meister) A.Tuji & A.Houki
- Aulacoseira pusilloidea B.Laslandes & Kociolek
- Aulacoseira pyxis (O.Müller) Simonsen
- Aulacoseira rdeiskoensis Genkal & Kulikovskiy
- Aulacoseira reicheltii Houk & Klee
- Aulacoseira royalpeacockii Siver
- Aulacoseira samariana Tremarin, Torgan & Ludwig
- Aulacoseira satsumaensis H.Tanaka
- Aulacoseira scala (Ehrenberg) Ognjanova-Rumenova, Buczkó & Jahn
- Aulacoseira scalaris (Grunow) Houk, Klee & Passauer
- Aulacoseira septentrionalis (K.E.Camburn & D.F.Charles) Genkal & Kulikovskiy
- Aulacoseira setanaensis H.Tanaka
- Aulacoseira simoniae Tremarin, Torgan & T.A.V.Ludwig
- Aulacoseira singularis Danuta Bennett & Kociolek
- Aulacoseira solida (Eulenstein) Krammer
- Aulacoseira spathulata B.Laslandes & Kociolek
- Aulacoseira sphaerica (Héribaud) Loseva
- Aulacoseira spiralis (Ehrenberg) Houk & Klee
- Aulacoseira spiralorimoportula Tudesque, Le Cohu & Van de Vijver
- Aulacoseira stevensiae Weide
- Aulacoseira subarctica (O.Müller) E.Y.Haworth
- Aulacoseira subborealis (Nygaard) Denys, Muylaert & Krammer
- Aulacoseira temperei (Pantocsek) Ognjanova-Rumenova & R.M.Crawford
- Aulacoseira tenella (Nygaard) Simonsen
- Aulacoseira tethera E.Y.Haworth
- Aulacoseira tsugaruensis H.Tanaka
- Aulacoseira turiecensis N.Ognjanova-Rumenova & Pipík
- Aulacoseira umanae Haberyan
- Aulacoseira uzonica Genkal & Lupikina
- Aulacoseira valida (Grunow) Krammer
- Aulacoseira vanlandinghamii Siver
- Aulacoseira veraluciae Tremarin, Torgan & T.Ludwig
- Aulacoseira virginvalleyana Siver
- Aulacoseira vitrea (Lohman & Andrews) Simonsen
- Aulacoseira volgensis Genkal
- Aulacoseira westfjordensis Van de Vijver, L.Willems & Pottiez
- Aulacoseira wyomingensis Greifenstein, Shea & Kociolek
- Aulacoseira youngii (Skvortzov) Kociolek & Khursevich
- Aulacoseira zautigensis Houk & Klee
