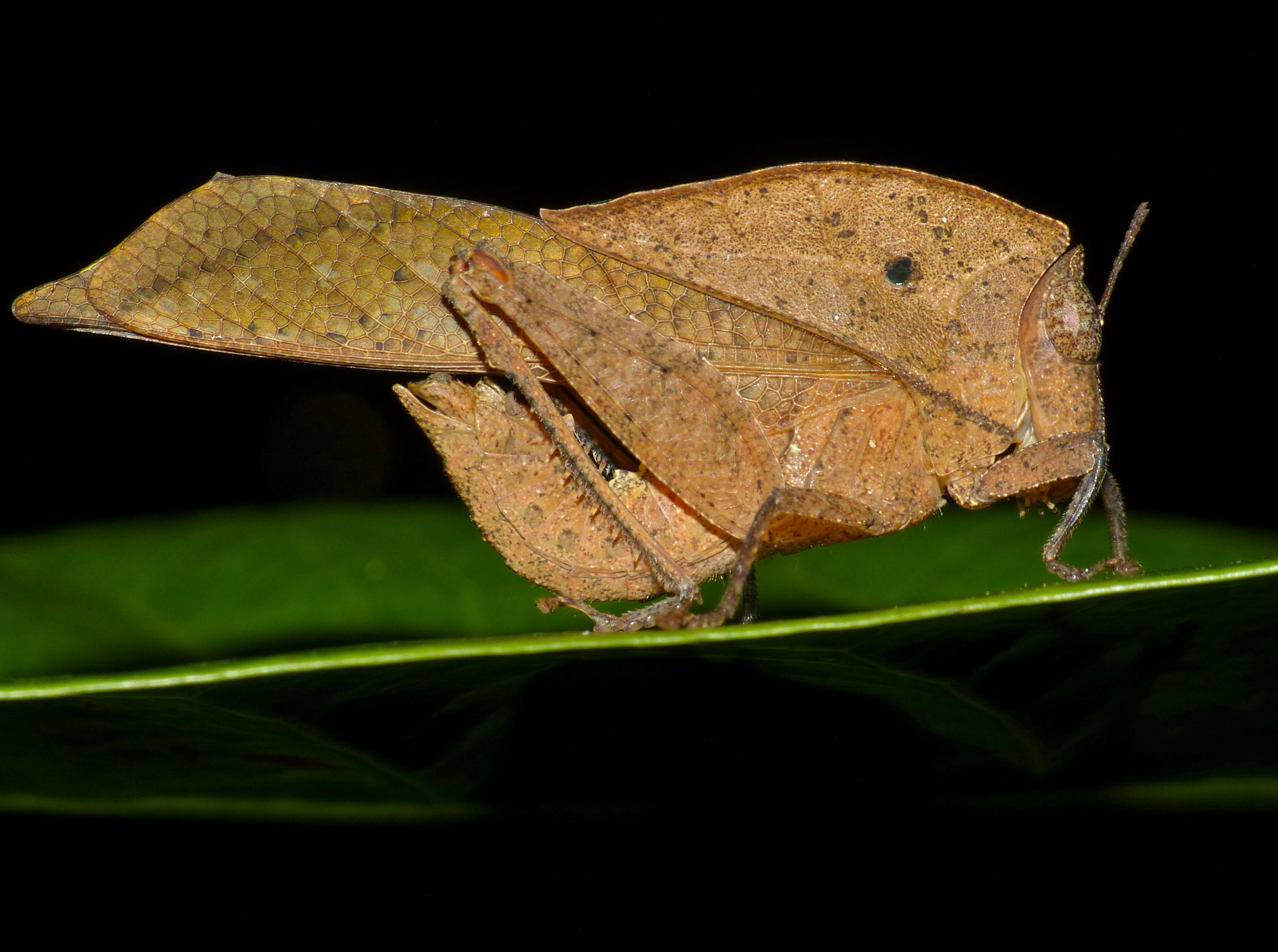
- Chorotypus sp.

Scientific classification
- Domain: Eukaryota
- Kingdom: Animalia
- Phylum: Arthropoda
- Class: Insecta
- Order: Orthoptera
- Suborder: Caelifera
- Infraorder: Acrididea
- Informal group: Acridomorpha
- Superfamily: Eumastacoidea
- Family: Chorotypidae; Stål, 1873

Subfamilies
- Chininae Burr, 1903; Chorotypinae (Burr, 1903); Erianthinae (Burr, 1903); Eruciinae Burr, 1903; Mnesicleinae Descamps, 1973; Prionacanthinae Descamps 1973

= Chorotypidae =

Family of grasshoppers

Chorotypidae is a family of tropical Asian grasshoppers (order Orthoptera), formerly included within the family Eumastacidae. These grasshoppers have a head that rises above the level of the thorax and short antennae. Some species have reduced wings, others have wings that widen towards the tips and still others have a flattened leaf-like shape. They lack abdominal tympani (hearing organs).

== Subfamilies and genera ==
The Orthoptera Species File lists the following:

=== Chininae ===
Chininae Burr 1899 - China, Indo-China

- China Burr, 1899
- Eupatrides Brunner von Wattenwyl, 1898

=== Chorotypinae ===
Auth. Stål 1873 - Asia, Southeast Asia, Central Africa

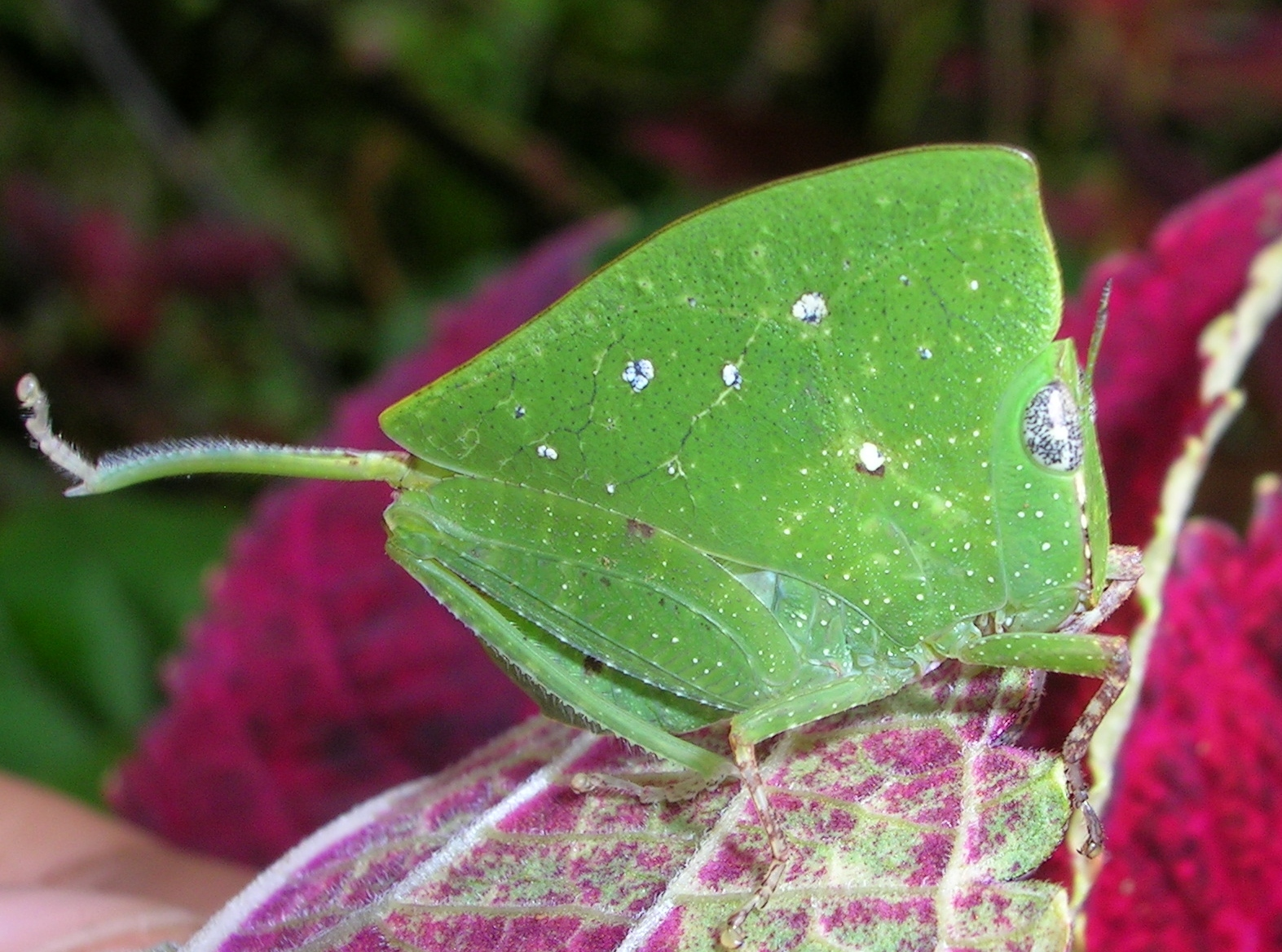
Phyllochoreia (India)

- Burrinia Bolívar, 1930
- Chorotypus Serville, 1838
- Hemierianthus Saussure, 1903
- Orchetypus Brunner von Wattenwyl, 1898
- Phyllochoreia Westwood, 1839
- Pseudorchetypus Descamps, 1974
- Scirtotypus Brunner von Wattenwyl, 1898
- Xiphicera Lamarck, 1817: Xiphicera gallinacea (Fabricius, 1793)

=== Erianthinae ===
Auth. Karsch 1889 - Southeast Asia, South Asia

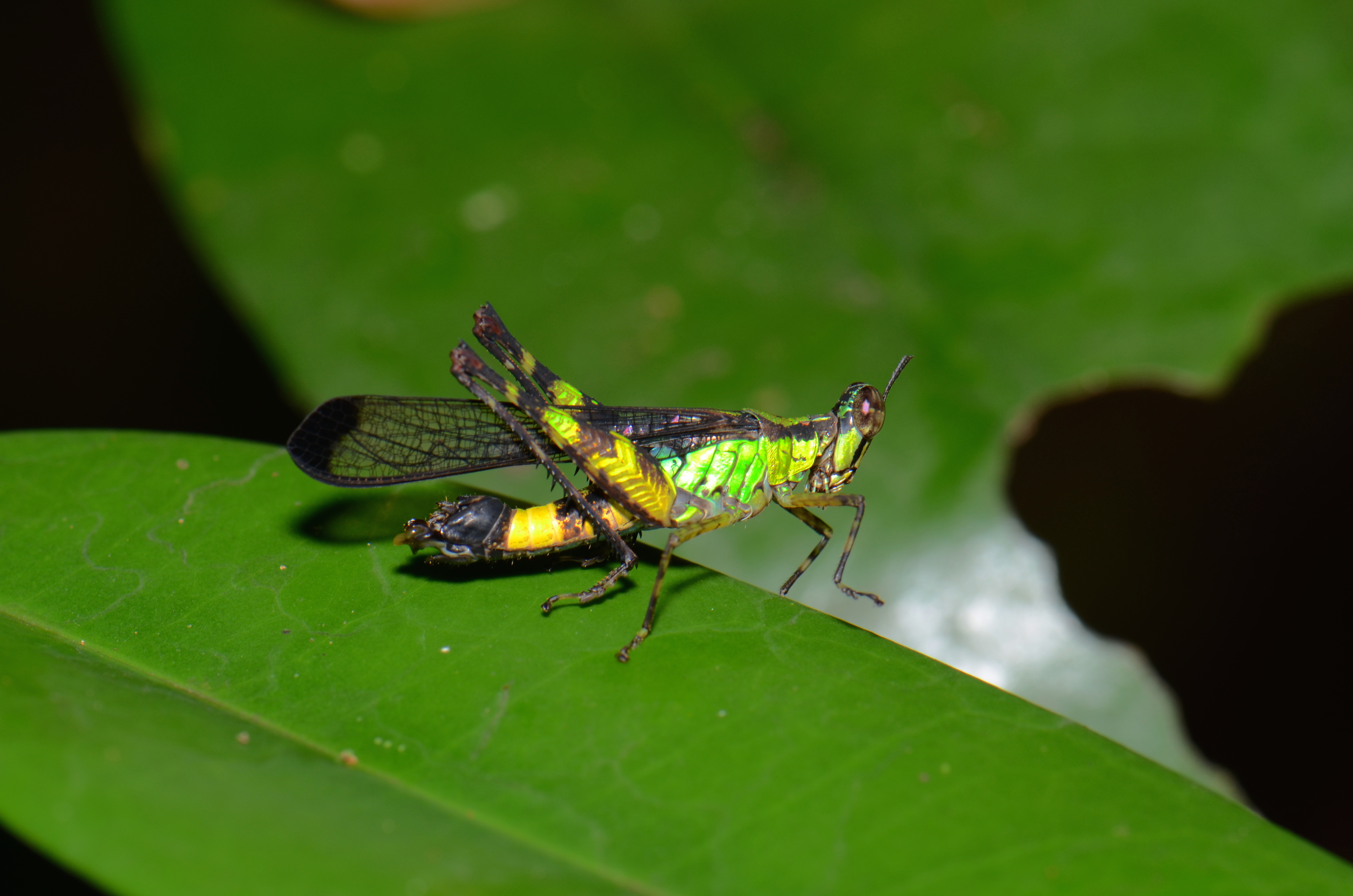
Erianthus sp.

- Bennia Burr, 1899
- Bornerianthus Descamps, 1975
- Butania Bolívar, 1903
- Erianthella Descamps, 1975
- Erianthina Descamps, 1975
- Erianthus Stål, 1875
- Khaserianthus Descamps, 1975
- Macroerianthus Descamps, 1975
- Pieltainerianthus Descamps, 1975
- Pseuderianthus Descamps, 1975
- Stenerianthus Descamps, 1975 - monotypic Stenerianthus annamensis Descamps, 1975
- Xenerianthus Descamps, 1975

=== Eruciinae ===
Auth. Burr 1899 - Southeast Asia

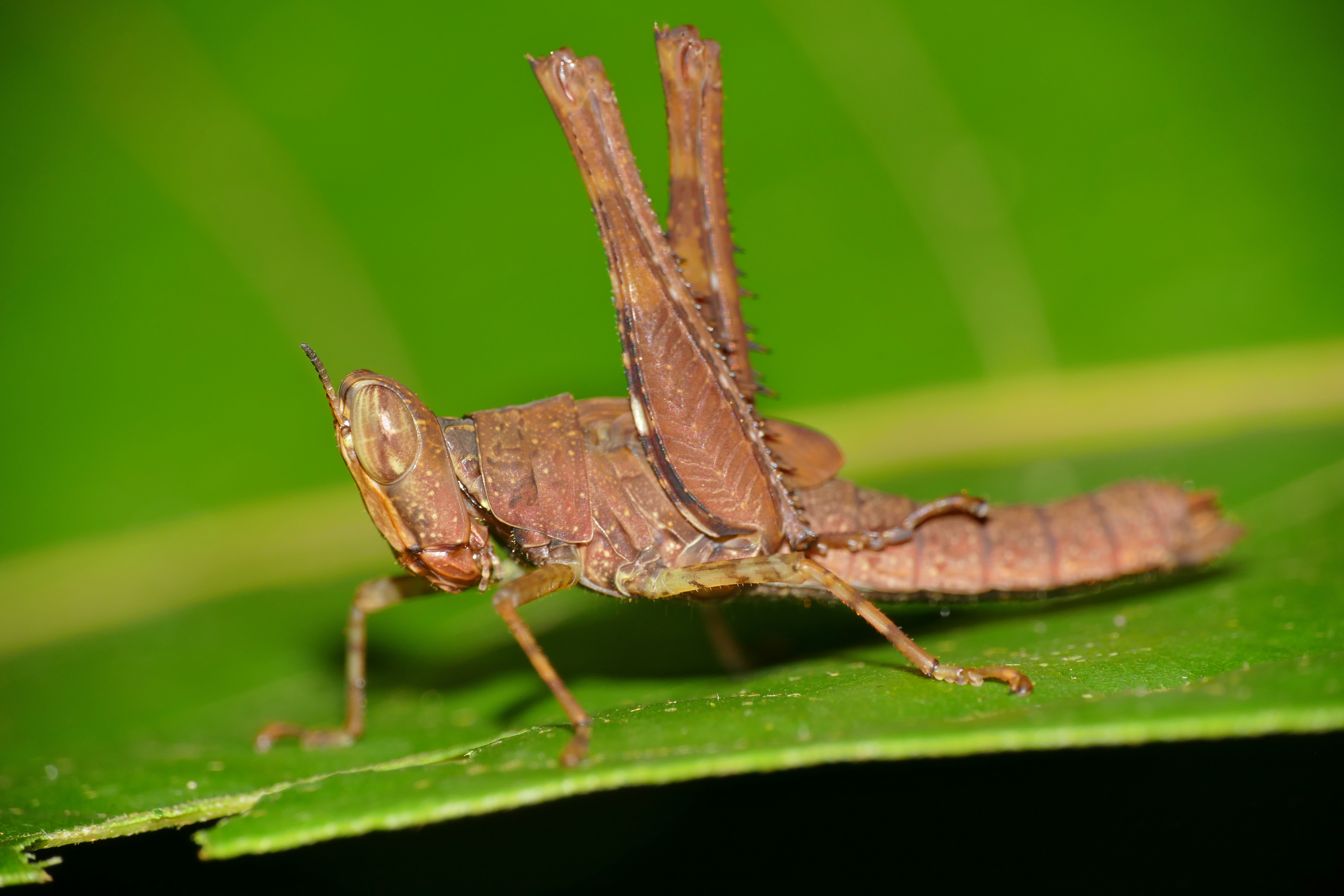
Erucius sp.

- Erucius Stål, 1875

=== Mnesicleinae ===
Auth. Descamps 1973 - Indo-Malayan Archipelago

- Adrapetes Karsch, 1889
- Borneacridium Kevan, 1963
- Chromomnesicles Descamps, 1974
- Hyalomnesicles Descamps, 1974
- Karnydia Bolívar, 1930
- Lobiacris Descamps, 1974
- Loximnesicles Descamps, 1974
- Mnesicles Stål, 1878
- Mnesiclesiella Descamps, 1974
- Mnesiclesina Descamps, 1974
- Odontomastax Bolívar, 1944
- Paramnesicles Descamps, 1974
- Philippinacridium Descamps, 1974
- Pseudomnesicles Descamps, 1974
- Samariella Descamps, 1974
- Sibuyania Descamps, 1974
- Tuberomastax Bolívar, 1944
- Uvarovia Bolívar, 1930
- Xenomnesicles Descamps, 1974

=== Prionacanthinae ===
Auth. Descamps 1973 - India

- Prionacantha Henry, 1940
