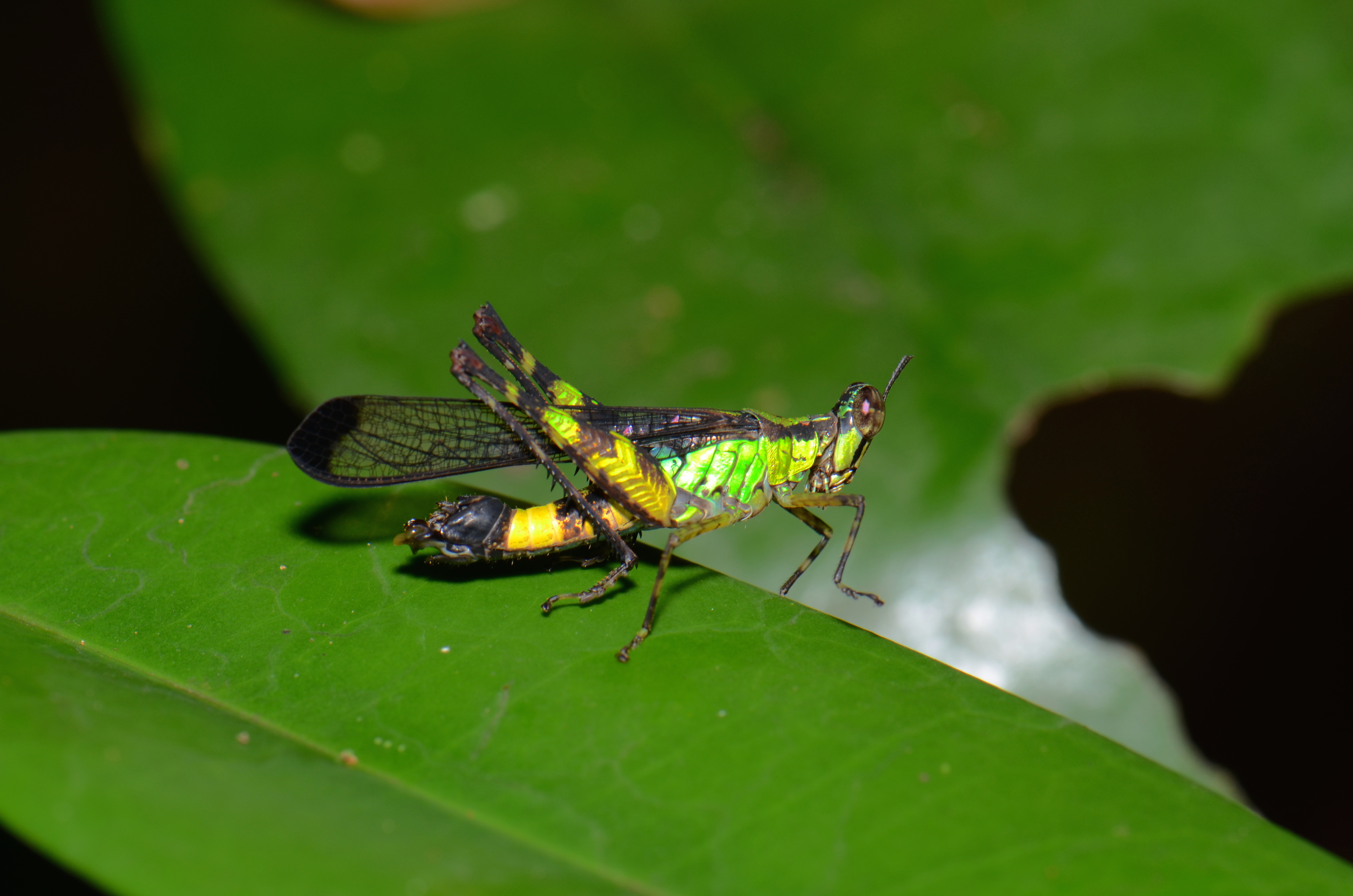
- Unknown Erianthus species from Malaysia

Scientific classification
- Kingdom: Animalia
- Phylum: Arthropoda
- Clade: Pancrustacea
- Class: Insecta
- Order: Orthoptera
- Suborder: Caelifera
- Family: Chorotypidae
- Subfamily: Erianthinae
- Genus: Erianthus; Stål, 1875

Type species
- Mastax guttata Westwood, 1841

= Erianthus (insect) =

Genus of grasshoppers

Erianthus is a genus of grasshoppers restricted to Southeast Asia. They occur in Japan, northeast India, Myanmar, Thailand, Vietnam, South China including Hong Kong, and extend east to Sumatra. In the past some neotropical species were also included in the genus. They have narrow ranges and species are identifiable only by their characteristics of male and female genitalia.

The genus was erected in 1875 by Swedish entomologist Carl Stål in his Observations Orthopterologiques. Erianthus is the family Chorotypidae and is the largest genus in the subfamily Erianthinae by number of species. The type species is Mastax guttata (now Erianthus guttatus).

== Species ==
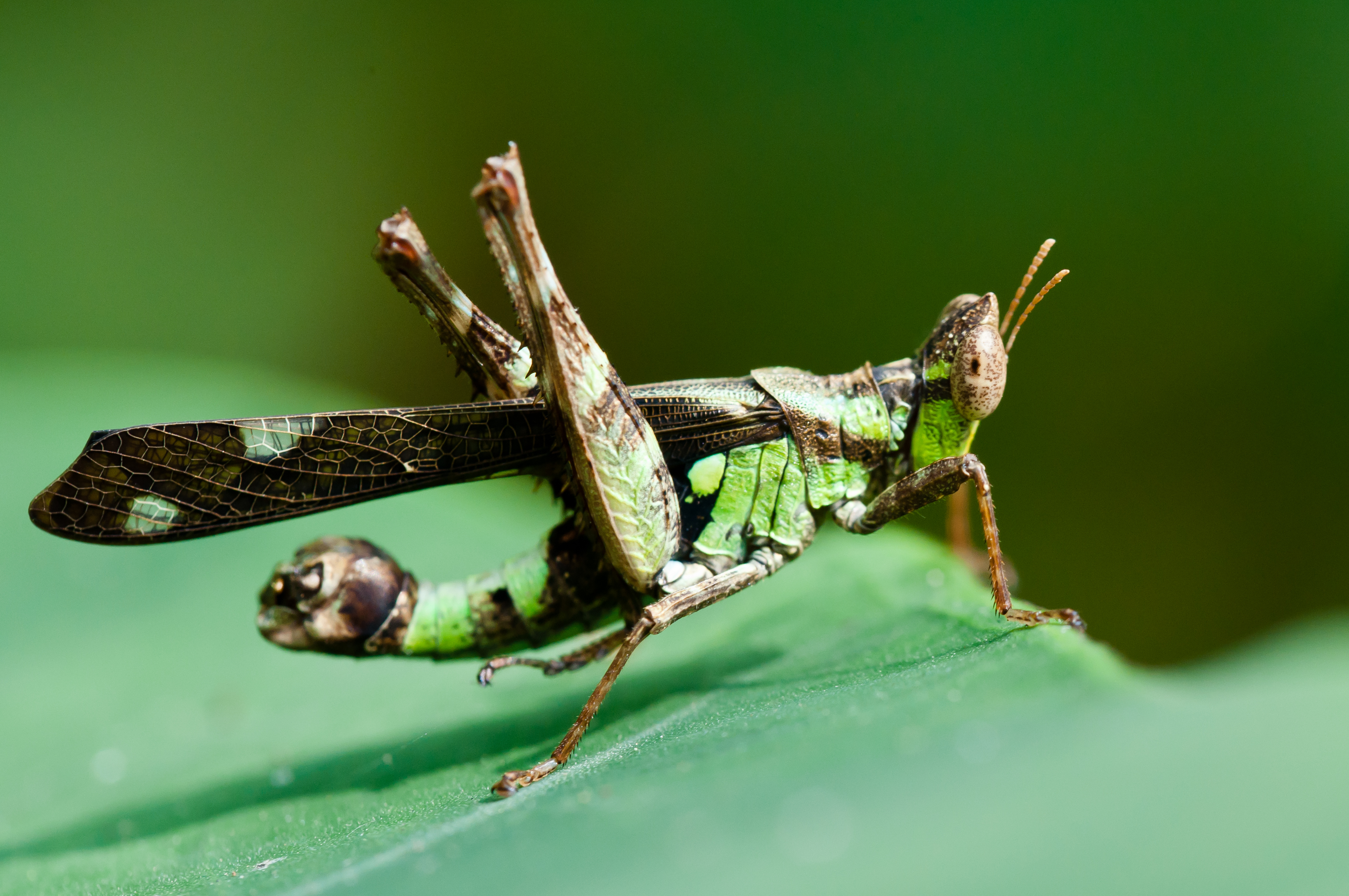
Erianthus versicolor

As of 2018, species in Erianthus include:

- Erianthus angulatus Ingrisch & Willemse, 1988 – Thailand
- Erianthus armatus Descamps, 1975 – Vietnam
- Erianthus bolivari Descamps, 1975 – Indochina
- Erianthus delattrei Descamps, 1975 – Cambodia
- Erianthus dohrni Bolívar, 1914 – Vietnam
- Erianthus fruhstorferi Bolívar, 1930 – Thailand
- Erianthus guttatus (Westwood, 1841) – Malesia
- Erianthus inhamatus Ingrisch & Willemse, 1988 – Thailand
- Erianthus malcolmi Bolívar, 1903 – Malaysia
- Erianthus manueli Ingrisch & Willemse, 1988 – Thailand
- Erianthus nipponensis Rehn, 1904 – Japan
- Erianthus pyramidalis Ingrisch & Willemse, 1988 – Thailand
- Erianthus rehni Descamps, 1975 – Thailand
- Erianthus serratus Ingrisch & Willemse, 1988 – Thailand
- Erianthus sukhothaiensis Descamps, 1981 – Thailand
- Erianthus versicolor Brunner von Wattenwyl, 1898 – Indochina
- Erianthus vitalisi Bolívar, 1914 – Indochina
