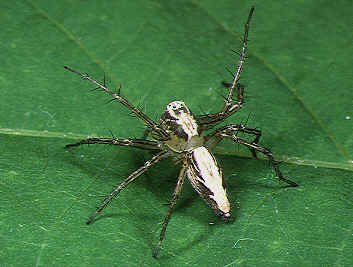
- female from Okinawa
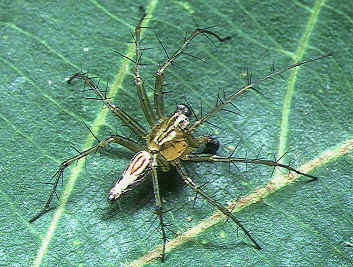
- male from Okinawa

Scientific classification
- Kingdom: Animalia
- Phylum: Arthropoda
- Subphylum: Chelicerata
- Class: Arachnida
- Order: Araneae
- Infraorder: Araneomorphae
- Family: Oxyopidae
- Genus: Oxyopes
- Species: O. sertatus

Binomial name
- Oxyopes sertatus L. Koch, 1878

Synonyms
- Argiope aequior Chamberlin, 1924

= Oxyopes sertatus =

Species of lynx spider

Oxyopes sertatus is a species of lynx spider in the family Oxyopidae. It is native to East Asia, where it is distributed across India, Nepal, China, Taiwan, Korea, and Japan.

== Taxonomy ==
The species was first described by Ludwig Carl Christian Koch in 1878 based on specimens from Japan. The holotype, an immature female, is deposited in the Natural History Museum, London.

In 1924, Ralph V. Chamberlin described Argiope aequior from specimens collected in China, but this was later determined to be a synonym of O. sertatus by Song Daxiang in 1988.

== Distribution ==
O. sertatus has a wide distribution across East Asia, with records from India, Nepal, China, Taiwan, Korea, and Japan. The species was first reported from India in 2020, extending its known range westward.

== Description ==
O. sertatus exhibits sexual dimorphism, with females being larger than males. Based on the original description by Bösenberg and Strand (1906), females range from 7–11 mm in total length, while males are approximately 9 mm.

The carapace is pale brownish, sometimes appearing greenish in life, with the eye region situated on a yellowish field with pale yellow hairs. Behind each of the six upper eyes is a deep black spot that is usually larger than the eyes themselves. The abdomen is yellowish-white with a broad brownish or gray-brown cardiac stripe that often extends to the spinnerets. Diagonal dark stripes extend from the sides toward the center of the abdomen.

The legs are brownish-yellow with strong, long spines, particularly prominent on the tibiae and metatarsi.

== Biological control ==
O. sertatus has been studied extensively for its role as a biological control agent of agricultural pests. In 1961, Izumi Kayashima conducted a notable field experiment in Japan, releasing 45,000 individuals of O. sertatus into a Cryptomeria forest to control the gall midge Contarinia inouyei. The study demonstrated a 53% reduction in damage caused by the pest, highlighting the species' potential as a biocontrol agent.
