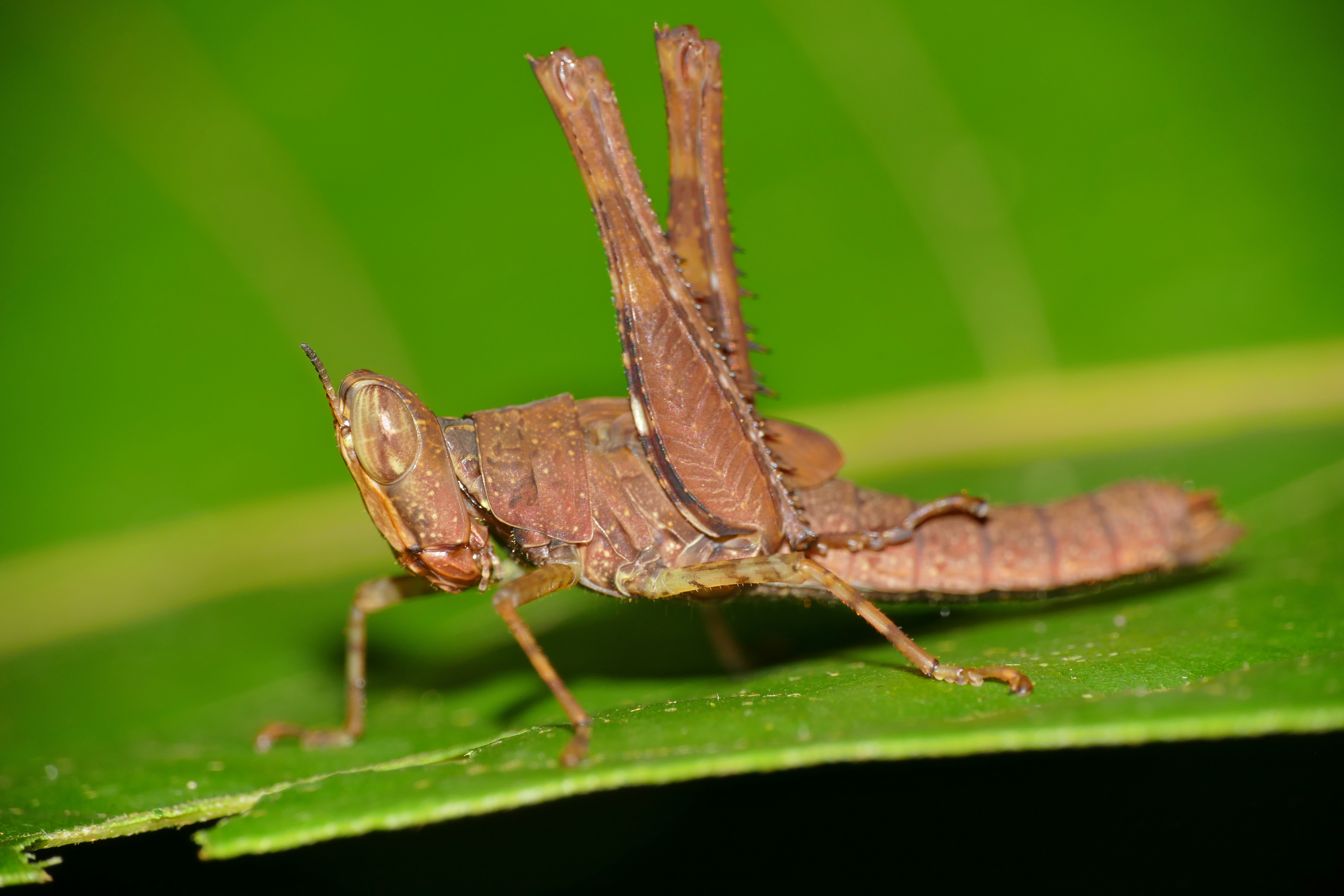
- Unidentified Erucius species

Scientific classification
- Kingdom: Animalia
- Phylum: Arthropoda
- Clade: Pancrustacea
- Class: Insecta
- Order: Orthoptera
- Suborder: Caelifera
- Family: Chorotypidae
- Subfamily: Eruciinae; Burr, 1899
- Genus: Erucius; Stål, 1875

= Erucius =

Genus of grasshoppers

Erucius is a genus of "monkey grasshoppers" in the family Chorotypidae. Species in this genus can be found in Vietnam and Malesia, including the Philippines. It is the only genus in the subfamily Eruciinae.

== Species ==
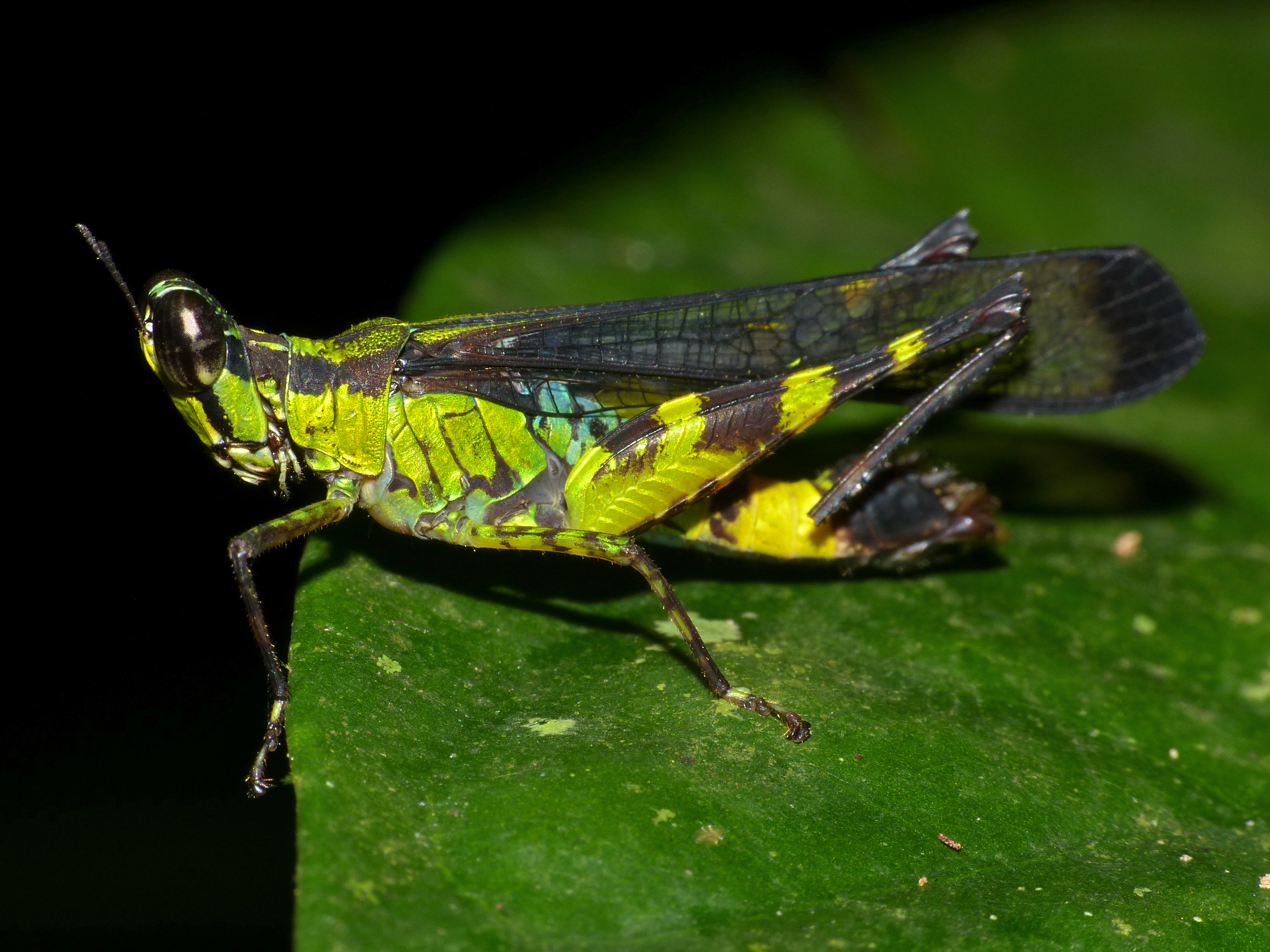
Unidentified Erucius species

As of 2018, subgenera and species include:

Erucius (Curieus) Bolívar, 1930

1. Erucius mjobergi Bolívar, 1944
2. Erucius tenuis Brunner von Wattenwyl, 1898

Eucius (Erucius) Stål, 1875

1. Erucius apicalis (Westwood, 1841) - type species (as Acridium agrionoides Haan)
2. Erucius bifasciatus Stål, 1877
3. Erucius brunneri Bolívar, 1914
4. Erucius dimidiatipes Bolívar, 1898
5. Erucius dusmeti Bolívar, 1930
6. Erucius erianthoides Bolívar, 1944
7. Erucius fruhstorferi Bolívar, 1930
8. Erucius labuanensis Bolívar, 1930
9. Erucius magnificus Rehn, 1904
10. Erucius moultoni Bolívar, 1930
11. Erucius pictus Saussure, 1903
12. Erucius sarawakensis Bolívar, 1944
13. Erucius singularis Bolívar, 1944
14. Erucius stali Bolívar, 1930
15. Erucius staudingeri Bolívar, 1930
16. Erucius vitreus (Westwood, 1841)
17. Erucius willemsei Bolívar, 1930
