= Chinese red pine =

Chinese red pine is a common name for several species of pine and may refer to:

- Pinus massoniana
- Pinus tabuliformis
