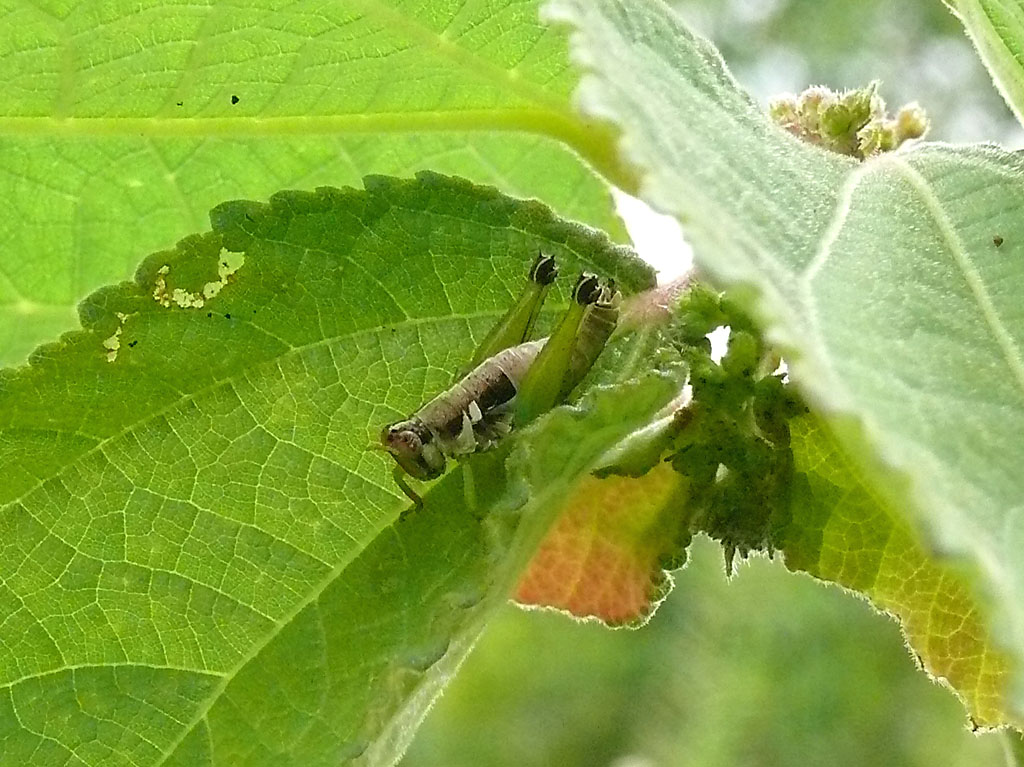
- Thericleid female from Tanzania

Scientific classification
- Domain: Eukaryota
- Kingdom: Animalia
- Phylum: Arthropoda
- Class: Insecta
- Order: Orthoptera
- Suborder: Caelifera
- Infraorder: Acrididea
- Informal group: Acridomorpha
- Superfamily: Eumastacoidea
- Family: Thericleidae; Burr, 1899

= Thericleidae =

Family of grasshoppers

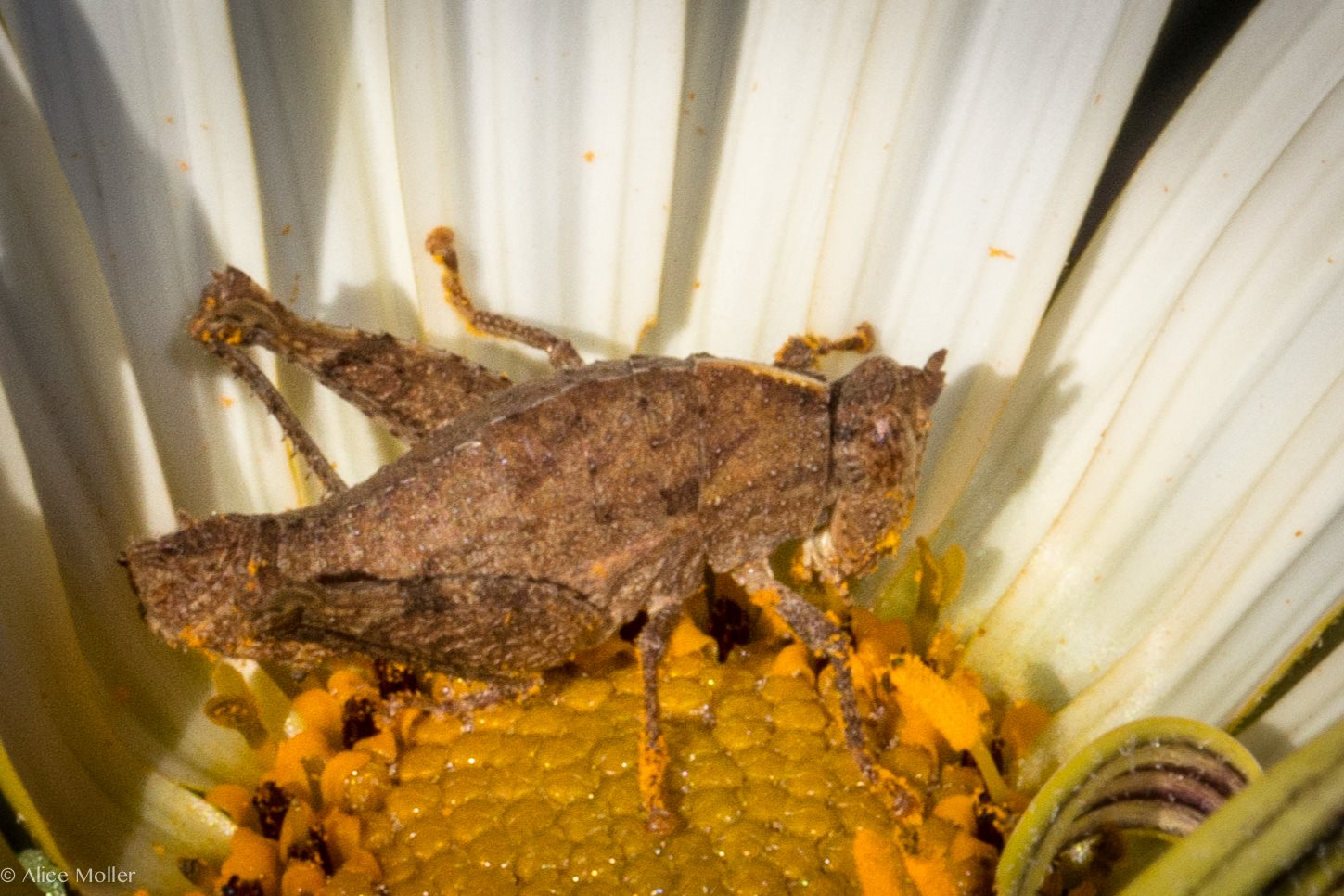
Unidentified wingless species of Thericleidae, showing characteristic "horse-head" and stubby antennae

The Thericleidae are a family of grasshoppers within the order Orthoptera and superfamily Eumastacoidea. They have exceptionally stubby antennae even for the Caelifera, with most species having a characteristic "horse-headed" look in profile.

The family occurs in Africa, most members living in small trees and shrubs rather than forbs or grasses.

The type genus is Thericles Stål, 1875. They are obscure insects, not well known to the public, but nonetheless have a few common names, including "monkey grasshoppers", whether because of the head shape, or because they are very agile in leaping about among the twigs of the trees they inhabit, is not clear. They also are called "bush hoppers", a name they share with the closely related Euschmidtiidae.

== Subfamilies and selected genera ==
- Afromastacinae Descamps, 1977
  - Afromastax Descamps, 1977
  - Clerithes Bolívar, 1914
- Barythericleinae Descamps, 1977 (monotypic)
  - Barythericles Descamps, 1977
- Chromothericleinae Descamps, 1977
  - Acanthothericles Descamps, 1977
  - Chromothericles Descamps, 1977
  - Dimorphothericles Descamps, 1977
- Loxicephalinae Descamps, 1977 (monotypic)
  - Loxicephala Descamps, 1977
- Plagiotriptinae Bolívar, 1914
  - Phaulotypus Burr, 1899
  - Plagiotriptus Karsch, 1889
  - Socotrella (insect) Popov, 1957
- Thericleinae Burr, 1899
  - Lophothericles Descamps, 1977
  - Thericles Stål, 1875
- incertae sedis
  - Smilethericles Baccetti, 1997
