= Betiscoides meridionalis =

Conservation status
- Endangered (IUCN 3.1)

Scientific classification
- Kingdom: Animalia
- Phylum: Arthropoda
- Class: Insecta
- Order: Orthoptera
- Suborder: Caelifera
- Nanorder: Acridomorpha
- Superfamily: Acridoidea
- Family: Lentulidae
- Subfamily: Lentulinae
- Genus: Betiscoides
- Species: B. meridionalis

Binomial name
- Betiscoides meridionalis Sjöstedt, 1923

Species of grasshopper

Betiscoides meridionalis, the slender restio grasshopper, is a species of lentulid grasshopper which is endemic to South Africa. It occurs only in the Western Cape where it is found in damp areas, in upland areas and on plateaux, vegetated with Restio species. This flightless grasshopper is threatened by droughts and wildfires which destroy its habitat. It is classified as an endangered species on the IUCN Red List.

It is a medium sized species, growing to a length of 36 mm (1.4 in), and its thin elongated body mimics the stems of the restios it is found among. Its smooth body is marked with three longitudinal stripes, one green, one grey, and the other brown. Adults are found from January to May.
