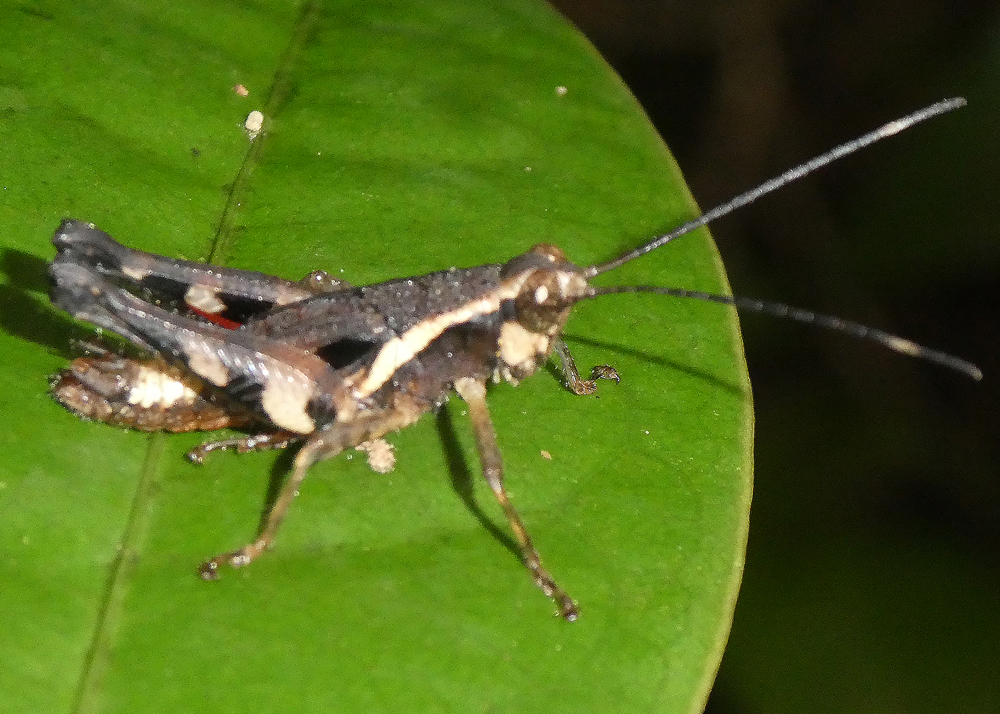
- Striatosedulia taken in Cát Tiên National Park

Scientific classification
- Kingdom: Animalia
- Phylum: Arthropoda
- Class: Insecta
- Order: Orthoptera
- Suborder: Caelifera
- Superfamily: Acridoidea
- Family: Acrididae
- Subfamily: Catantopinae
- Genus: Striatosedulia
- Species: S. cattiensis

Binomial name
- Striatosedulia cattiensis Dawwrueng, Storozhenko & Asanok, 2015

= Striatosedulia cattiensis =

Species of grasshopper

Striatosedulia cattiensis is a species of grasshoppers in the subfamily Catantopinae, found in Vietnam.

This species was named after Cát Tiên National Park, which is the type locality and is thought to be endemic to Dong Nai Province.
