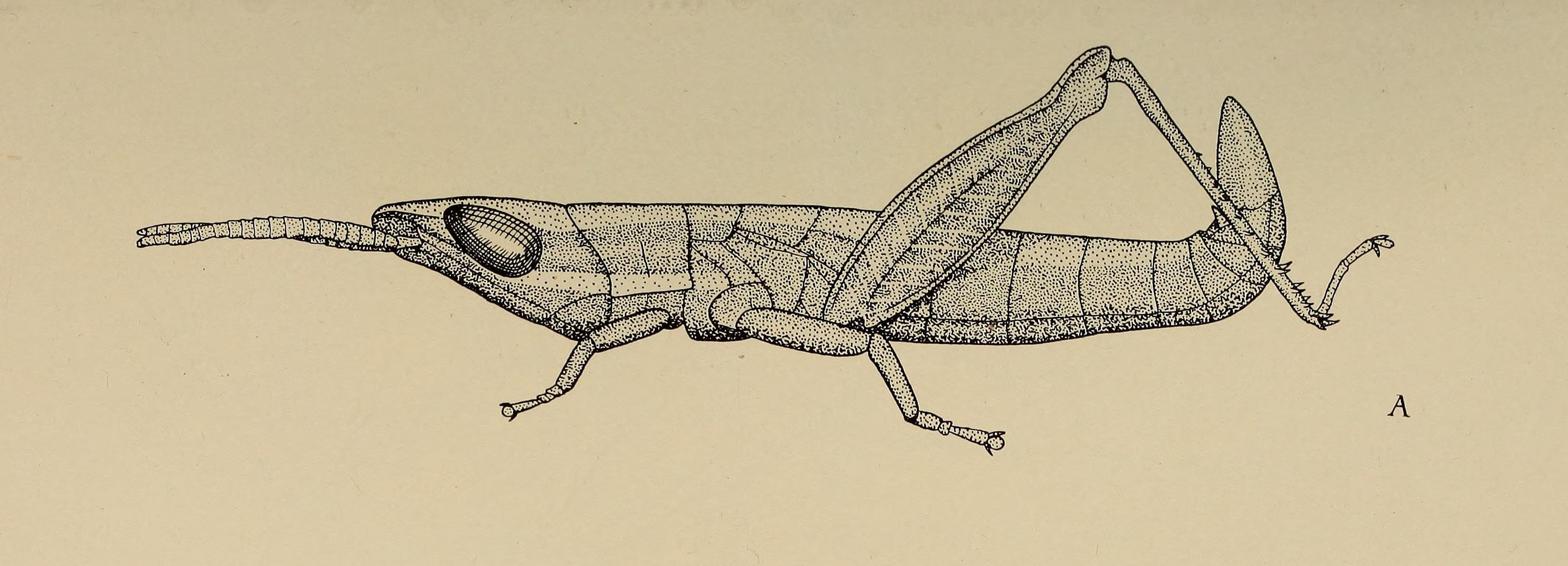
- Betiscoides parva

Scientific classification
- Kingdom: Animalia
- Phylum: Arthropoda
- Clade: Pancrustacea
- Class: Insecta
- Order: Orthoptera
- Suborder: Caelifera
- Superfamily: Acridoidea
- Family: Lentulidae
- Subfamily: Lentulinae
- Genus: Betiscoides; Sjöstedt, 1923

Type species
- Betiscoides meridionalis Sjöstedt, 1923

= Betiscoides =

Genus of grasshoppers

Betiscoides is a small genus of southern African grasshoppers in the family Lentulidae.

The grasshoppers of the genus Betiscoides have slender or very slender bodies and they are flightless, lacking wings. They have a conical head and the antennae are tapering. They are all found among the reed-like wetland plants of the genus Restio and their common name is the restio grasshoppers. All three species are classified as Endangered on the IUCN Red List.

== Species ==
There are three species in the genus Betiscoides:

- Betiscoides meridionalis Sjöstedt, 1923 – slender restio grasshopper
- Betiscoides parva Key, 1937 – small restio grasshopper
- Betiscoides sjostedti Key, 1937 – robust restio grasshopper
