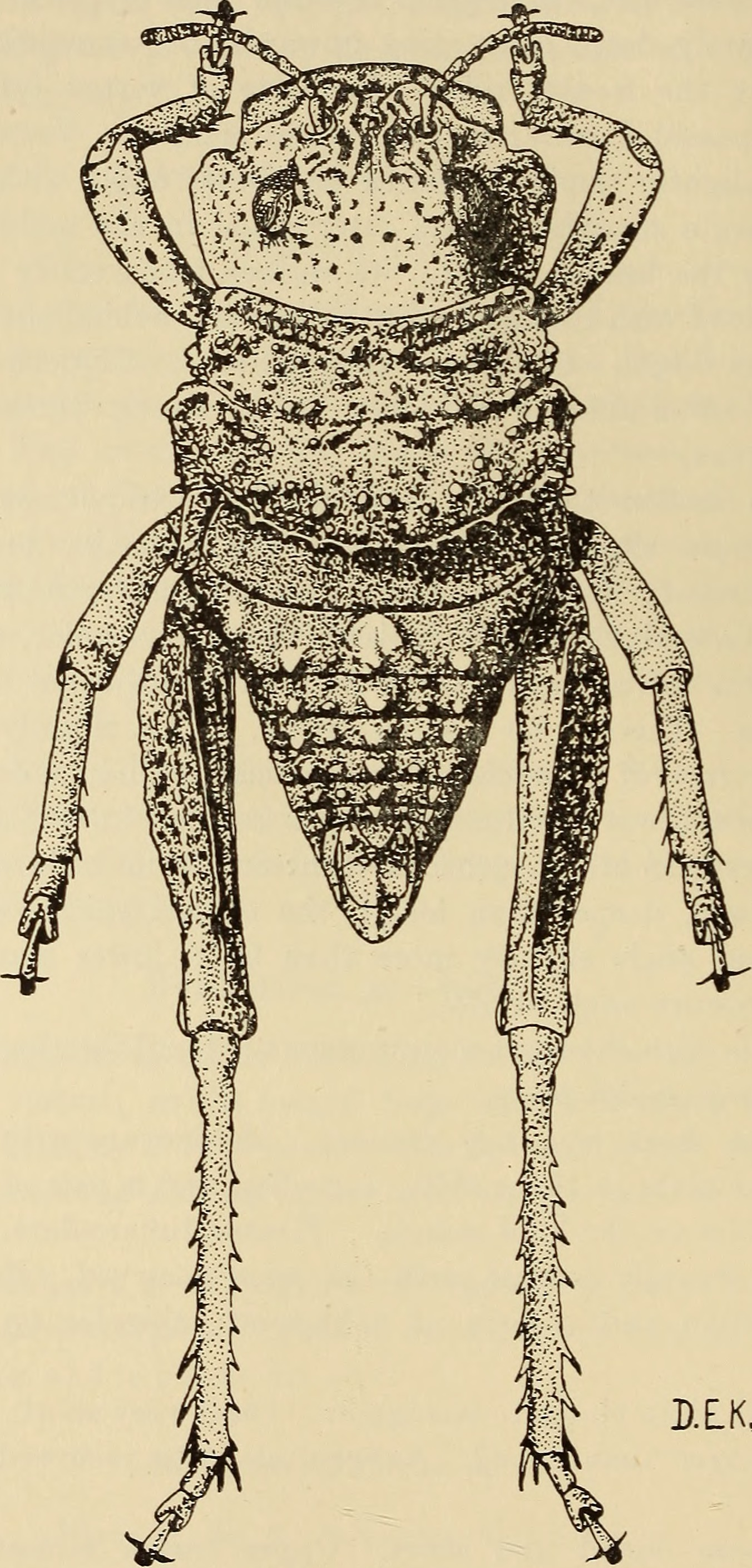
- Batrachidacris rubridens (Uvarov, 1929)

Scientific classification
- Domain: Eukaryota
- Kingdom: Animalia
- Phylum: Arthropoda
- Class: Insecta
- Order: Orthoptera
- Suborder: Caelifera
- Superfamily: Acridoidea
- Family: Lathiceridae; Dirsh, 1954

= Lathiceridae =

Family of grasshoppers

The Lathiceridae are a family of grasshoppers, in the Orthoptera: suborder Caelifera. Species in this family can be found in the desert regions of southern Africa where they resemble the stony ground on which they live. They are characterized by their apterous (wingless) bodies, which are dorsoventrally depressed and often excessively widened in the metathoracic region, giving them a spindle-like appearance. Their integument is sculptured and rugose, and their coloration varies from white to brown and purple, harmonizing with the color of the substratum on which they live.

== Genera ==
The Orthoptera Species File lists:

- Batrachidacris Uvarov, 1939
- Crypsicerus Saussure, 1888
- Lathicerus Saussure, 1888
