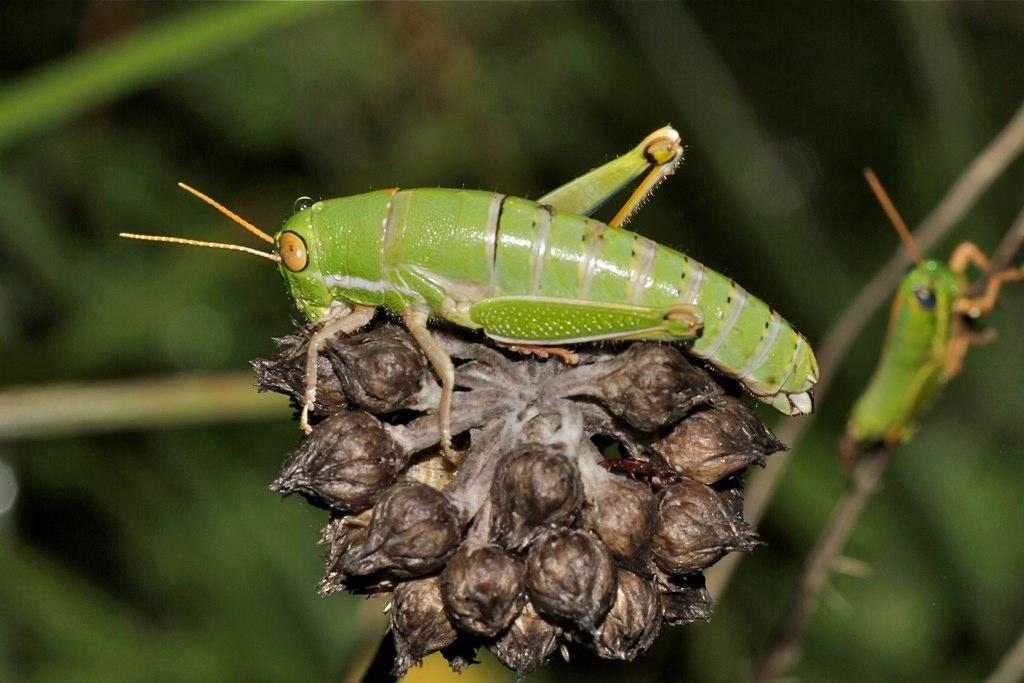
- Unknown Lentula species

Scientific classification
- Kingdom: Animalia
- Phylum: Arthropoda
- Clade: Pancrustacea
- Class: Insecta
- Order: Orthoptera
- Suborder: Caelifera
- Family: Lentulidae
- Subfamily: Lentulinae
- Genus: Lentula; Stål, 1878

= Lentula =

Genus of grasshoppers

Lentula is a small genus (15 species) of grasshoppers native to southern Africa. It is the type genus of the family Lentulidae.

Species include:

- Lentula callani Dirsh, 1956
- Lentula candidoi Ramme, 1929
- Lentula duiwelensis Otte, Cowper & Armstrong, 2023
- Lentula marcida (Rehn, 1944)
- Lentula mecostiboides Ramme, 1929
- Lentula minuta Dirsh, 1956
- Lentula moamba Otte, Cowper & Armstrong, 2023
- Lentula obtusifrons Stål, 1878
- Lentula prasinata (Rehn, 1944)
- Lentula schoemani Otte, Cowper & Armstrong, 2023
- Lentula seposita (Bolívar, 1889)
- Lentula simangoi Otte, Cowper & Armstrong, 2023
- Lentula swatini Otte, Cowper & Armstrong, 2023
- Lentula tuberculata Miller, 1932
- Lentula vansoni (Rehn, 1944)
