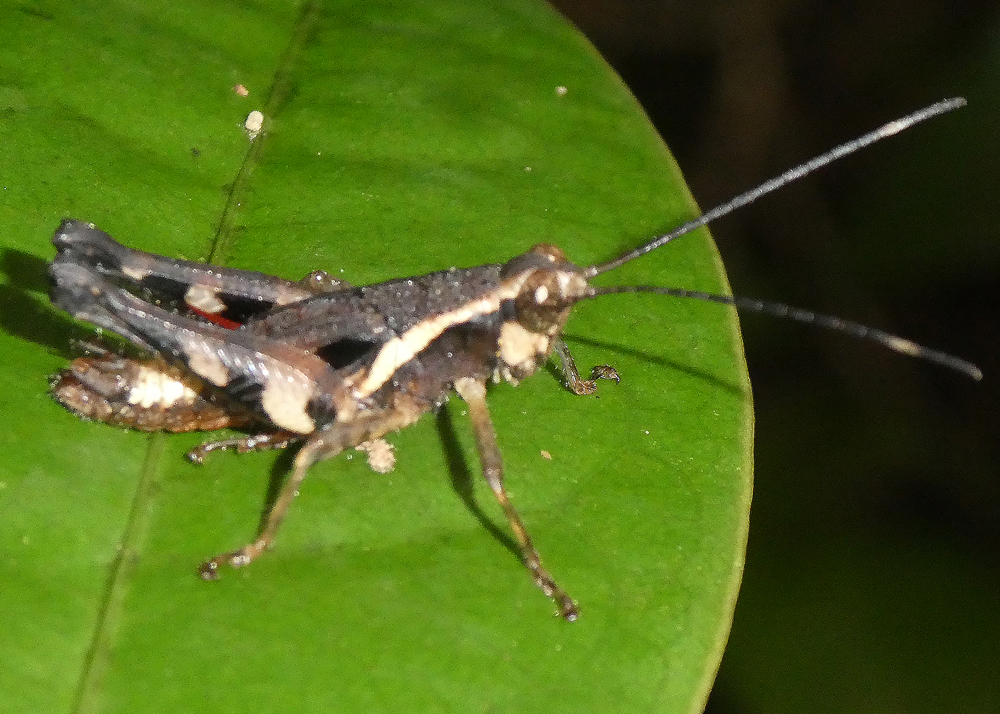
- Striatosedulia taken in Cát Tiên National Park

Scientific classification
- Domain: Eukaryota
- Kingdom: Animalia
- Phylum: Arthropoda
- Class: Insecta
- Order: Orthoptera
- Suborder: Caelifera
- Superfamily: Acridoidea
- Family: Acrididae
- Subfamily: Catantopinae
- Genus: Striatosedulia; Ingrisch, 1989

= Striatosedulia =

Genus of grasshoppers

Striatosedulia is a genus of grasshoppers in the family Acrididae, subfamily Catantopinae, found in Indo-China.

== Species ==
The Orthoptera Species File lists:

- Striatosedulia beybienkoi Storozhenko, 2005 (Thailand)
- Striatosedulia cattiensis Dawwrueng, Storozhenko & Asanok, 2015 (Vietnam)
- Striatosedulia ingrishi Storozhenko, 1992 (Vietnam)
- Striatosedulia pluvisilvatica Ingrisch, 1989 - type species (Thailand)
- Striatosedulia pooae Tan, Dawwrueng & Artchawakom, 2017 (Thailand)
