= Pamphagodidae =

Scientific classification
- Domain: Eukaryota
- Kingdom: Animalia
- Phylum: Arthropoda
- Class: Insecta
- Order: Orthoptera
- Suborder: Caelifera
- Superfamily: Acridoidea
- Family: Pamphagodidae; Bolívar, 1884

Synonyms
- Charilaidae Dirsh, 1953; Charilainae Dirsh, 1953; Pamphagodae Bolívar, 1884; Pamphagodes Bolívar, 1884; Pamphagodinae Bolívar, 1884

Family of grasshoppers

Pamphagodidae is a small family of grasshoppers in the Orthoptera: suborder Caelifera. Species in this family can be found in southern Africa and Morocco.

== Placement and description ==
The oldest published name for this group is Pamphagodidae. However, the name Charilaidae became widely used, until a review by the International Commission on Zoological Nomenclature determined the valid name.

Members of this 'basal' grasshopper family tend to be large grasshoppers and are typically apterous or brachypterous. A common feature for these genera is that the pronotum has two parallel median keels.

== Genera ==
As of January 2021, genera and species in the family Pamphagodidae include:

- Charilaus Stål, 1875
  - Charilaus carinatus Stål, 1875
- Hemicharilaus Dirsh, 1953
  - Hemicharilaus brunneri (Saussure, 1899)
  - Hemicharilaus monomorphus (Uvarov, 1929)
- Pamphagodes Bolívar, 1878
  - Pamphagodes riffensis Bolívar, 1878
- Paracharilaus Dirsh, 1961
  - Paracharilaus curvicollis (Karny, 1910)
