= Lithidiidae =

Scientific classification
- Kingdom: Animalia
- Phylum: Arthropoda
- Clade: Pancrustacea
- Class: Insecta
- Order: Orthoptera
- Suborder: Caelifera
- Superfamily: Acridoidea
- Family: Lithidiidae; Dirsh, 1961

Family of grasshoppers

The Lithidiidae was a family of grasshoppers, (suborder Caelifera), originally described by Vitaly Dirsh; species are found in Africa and now mostly placed in the Lentulidae.

== Genera ==
The Orthoptera Species File now places genera as follows:

- Eneremius Saussure, 1888 - Lentulidae incertae sedis: synonym Lithidium Uvarov, 1925
- Lithidiopsis Dirsh, 1956 - Lentulidae incertae sedis
- Microtmethis Karny, 1910 (monotypic) - Acridoidea incertae sedis
