= Tristiridae =

Scientific classification
- Domain: Eukaryota
- Kingdom: Animalia
- Phylum: Arthropoda
- Class: Insecta
- Order: Orthoptera
- Suborder: Caelifera
- Superfamily: Acridoidea
- Genus: Tristiridae; Rehn, 1906

Family of grasshoppers

The Tristiridae are a family of grasshoppers, in the Orthoptera: suborder Caelifera. Species in this family can be found in the Americas.

== Genera ==
The Orthoptera Species File lists:

- Atacamacridinae Carbonell & A. Mesa, 1972
    - Atacamacris Carbonell & Mesa, 1972
- Tristirinae Rehn, 1906
  - Elasmoderini Cigliano, 1989
    - Elasmoderus Saussure, 1888
    - Enodisomacris Cigliano, 1989
    - Uretacris Liebermann, 1943
  - Tristirini Rehn, 1906
    - Bufonacris Walker, 1871
    - Circacris Ronderos & Cigliano, 1989
    - Crites Rehn, 1942
    - Incacris Rehn, 1942
    - Moluchacris Rehn, 1942
    - Pappacris Uvarov, 1940
    - Paracrites Rehn, 1942
    - Peplacris Rehn, 1942
    - Punacris Rehn, 1942
    - Tristira Brunner von Wattenwyl, 1900
  - Tropidostethini Giglio-Tos, 1898
    - Elysiacris Rehn, 1942
    - Eremopachys Brancsik, 1901
    - Tebacris Cigliano, 1989
    - Tropidostethus Philippi, 1863
