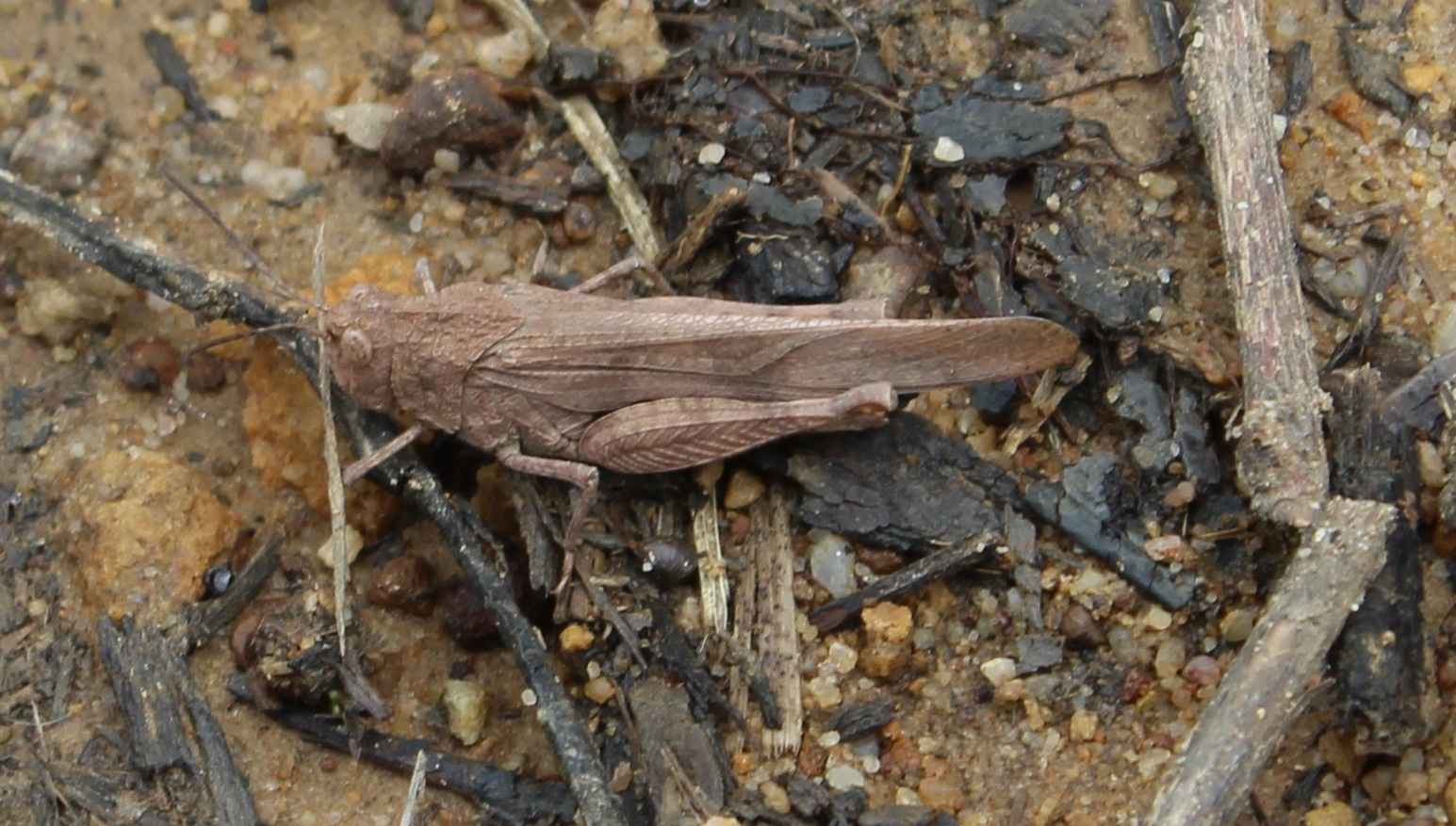
- Ommexecha apolinari

Scientific classification
- Domain: Eukaryota
- Kingdom: Animalia
- Phylum: Arthropoda
- Class: Insecta
- Order: Orthoptera
- Suborder: Caelifera
- Superfamily: Acridoidea
- Family: Ommexechidae; Bolívar, 1884

= Ommexechidae =

Family of grasshoppers

The Ommexechidae are a family of grasshoppers, in the Orthoptera: suborder Caelifera. Species in this family can be found in the Americas.

== Genera ==
The Orthoptera Species File lists:

- Aucacridinae Rehn, 1943
  - Aucacris Hebard, 1929
  - Conometopus Blanchard, 1851
  - Cumainocloidus Bruner, 1913
  - Neuquenina Rosas Costa, 1954
- Illapeliinae Carbonell & A. Mesa, 1972
  - Illapelia Carbonell & Mesa, 1972
- Ommexechinae Bolívar, 1884
  - Calcitrena Eades, 1961
  - Clarazella Pictet & Saussure, 1887
  - Descampsacris Ronderos, 1972
  - Graea Philippi, 1863
  - Ommexecha Serville, 1831
  - Pachyossa Rehn, 1913
  - Spathalium Bolívar, 1884
  - Tetrixocephalus Gurney & Liebermann, 1963
