= Nosema locustae =

Scientific classification
- Kingdom: Fungi
- Phylum: Rozellomycota
- Class: Microsporidia
- Family: Nosematidae
- Genus: Nosema
- Species: N. locustae

Binomial name
- Nosema locustae Canning, 1953

Nosema locustae is a microsporidian fungus that is used to kill grasshoppers, caterpillars, some corn borers and crickets.

== Effects on grasshoppers ==
When consumed, N. locustae affects the digestive system of a grasshopper through a buildup in the gut, eventually killing it by creating lethargy and a lack of appetite; it is also transferable from a deceased infected grasshopper that is consumed. In a study done at Linköping University using N. locustae and a central Ethiopian grasshopper species, 55% of the grasshoppers that were not inoculated reached adulthood, while only 19% of the ones that were inoculated did.

== Farm application ==
The spores are typically applied to a carrier, usually wheat bran, and can be spread through the use of a variety of devices. Typical application is one pound per acre, at a rate of 1 billion plus spores.
