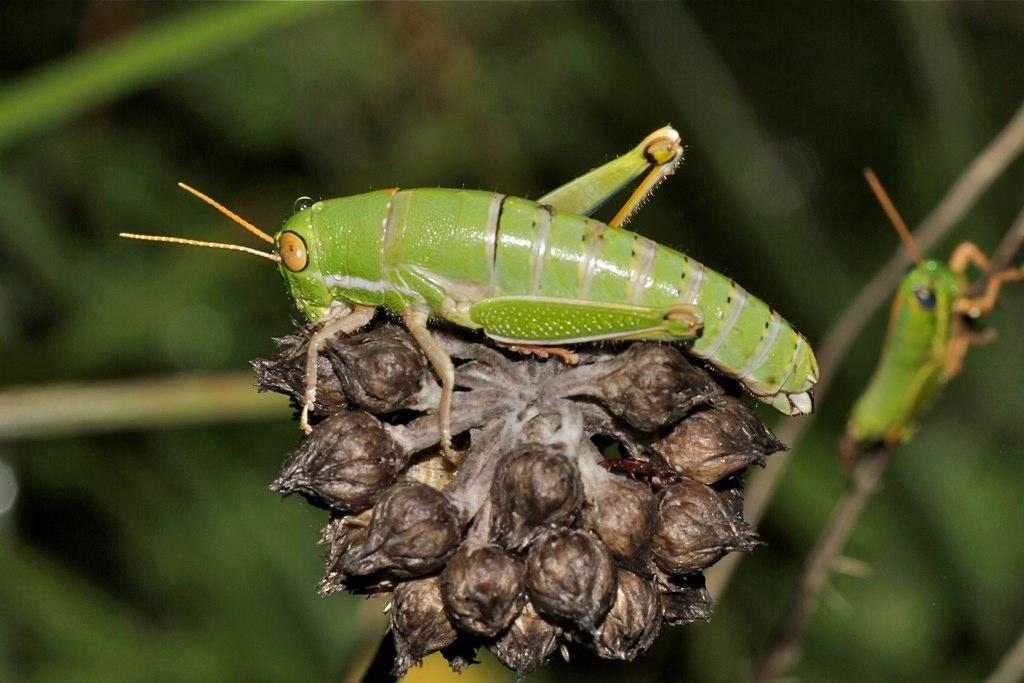
- Unknown Lentula species

Scientific classification
- Kingdom: Animalia
- Phylum: Arthropoda
- Class: Insecta
- Order: Orthoptera
- Suborder: Caelifera
- Superfamily: Acridoidea
- Family: Lentulidae; Dirsh, 1956

= Lentulidae =

Family of grasshoppers

The Lentulidae are a family of flightless grasshoppers found in sub-Saharan Africa and now includes genera previously placed in the Lithidiidae.

== Subfamilies and Genera ==
The Orthoptera Species File includes:

=== Lentulinae ===
Auth. Dirsh, 1956

- Altiusambilla Jago, 1981
- Bacteracris Dirsh, 1956
- Basutacris Dirsh, 1953
- Betiscoides Sjöstedt, 1923
- Chromousambilla Jago, 1981
- Devylderia Sjöstedt, 1923
- Eremidium Karsch, 1896 - includes Armstrongium Brown, 2014
- Gymnidium Karsch, 1896
- Helwigacris Rehn, 1944
- Karruia Rehn, 1945
- Lentula Stål, 1878
- Limpopoacris Brown, 2011
- Malawia Dirsh, 1968
- Mecostiboides Dirsh, 1957
- Mecostibus Karsch, 1896
- Microusambilla Jago, 1981
- Nyassacris Ramme, 1929
- Paralentula Rehn, 1944
- Qachasia Dirsh, 1956
- Rhainopomma Jago, 1981
- Swaziacris Dirsh, 1953
- Usambilla Sjöstedt, 1910

=== Shelforditinae ===
Auth. Ritchie, 1982

1. Afrotettix Brown, 1970
2. Atopotettix Brown, 1970
3. Calviniacris Dirsh, 1956 (synonyms Dirshidium Brown, 1970 Uvarovidium Dirsh, 1956)
4. Leatettix Dirsh, 1956
5. Shelfordites Karny, 1910 (synonyms Kalaharicus Brown, 1961, Karruacris Dirsh, 1958, Occidentula Brown, 1967)

=== Subfamily unplaced ===
1. Eneremius Saussure, 1888 - includes obsolete genus Lithidium Uvarov, 1925
2. Laurelitettix Otte, Cowper & Armstrong, 2023
3. Lithidiopsis Dirsh, 1956
4. Malentula Otte, Cowper & Armstrong, 2023
5. Ruffinia Otte, Cowper & Armstrong, 2023
6. Tanquata Otte, 2014
7. Tsautettix Otte, 2014
8. Zulutettix Otte & Armstrong, 2017

== Gallery ==
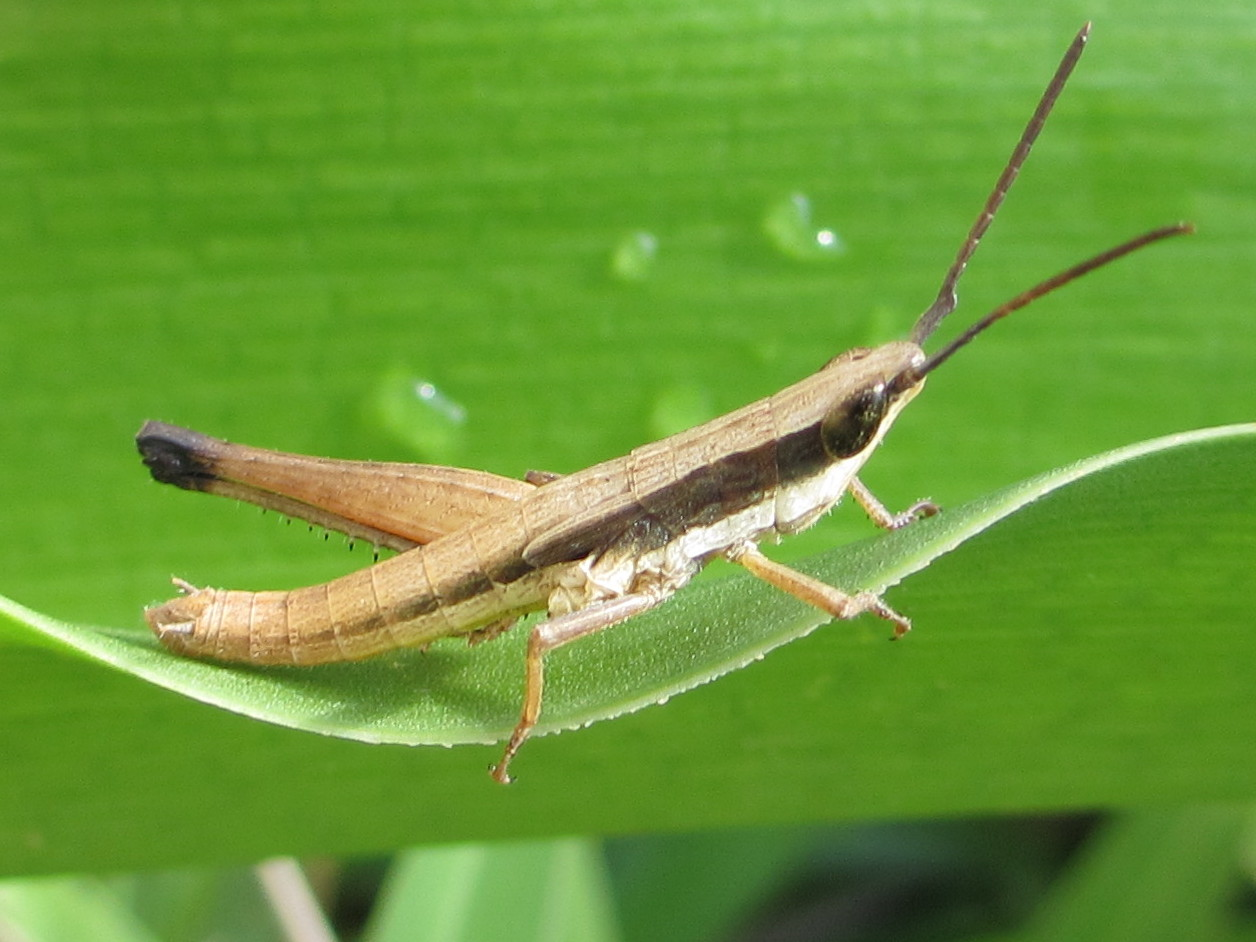
Unknown species

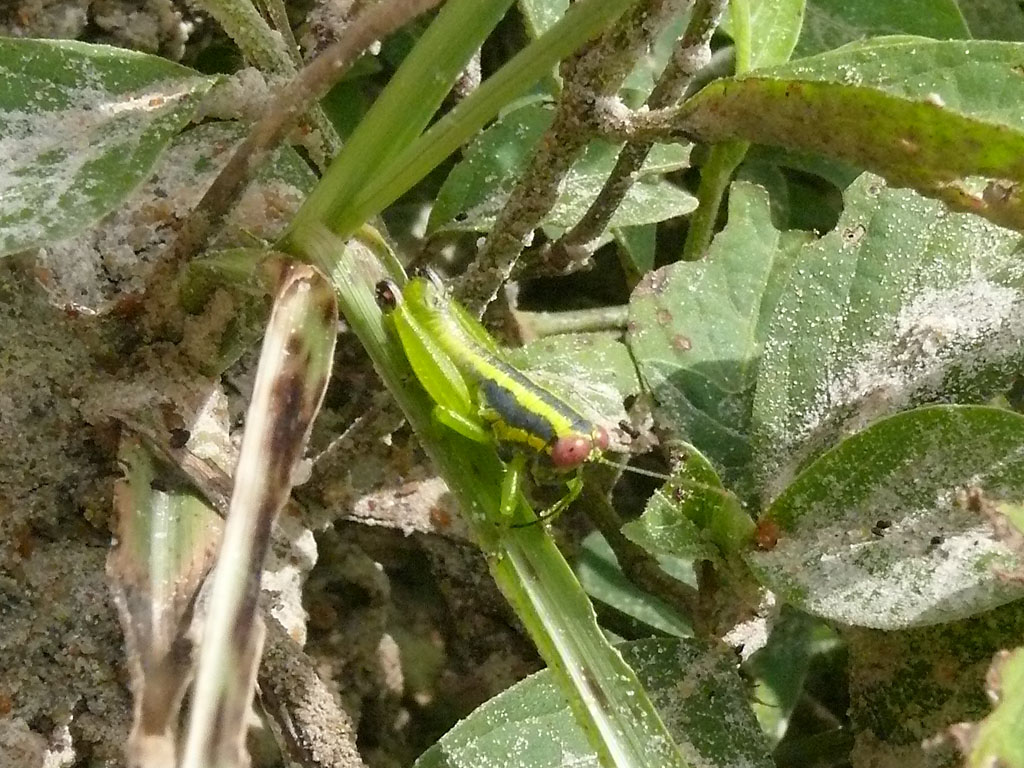
Male Chromousambilla latistriata

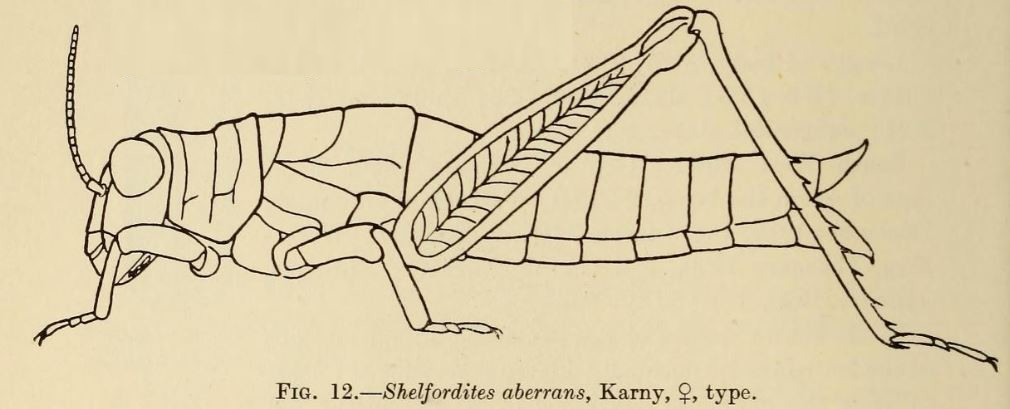
Shelfordites aberrans
