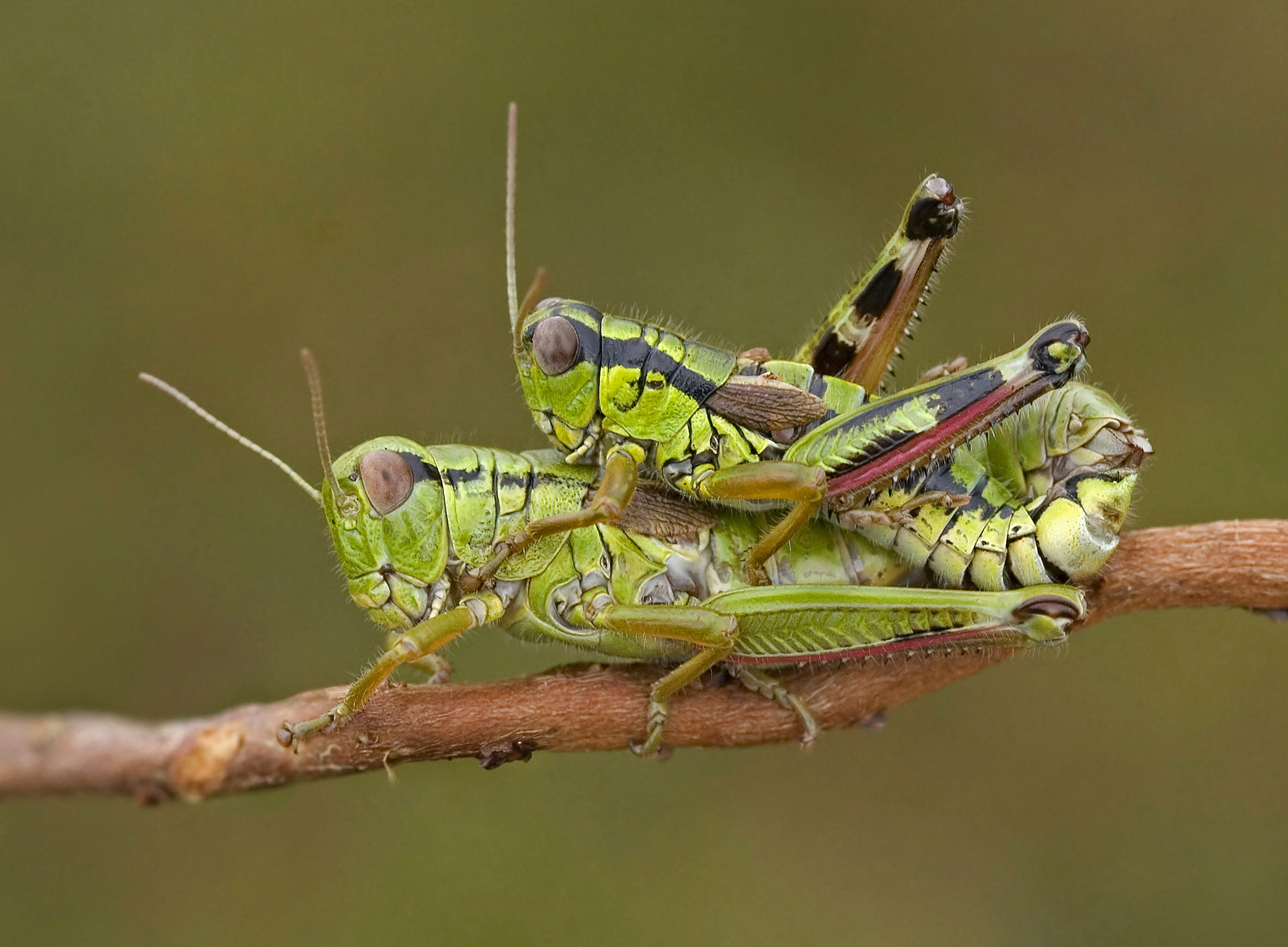
- Miramella alpina

Scientific classification
- Kingdom: Animalia
- Phylum: Arthropoda
- Class: Insecta
- Order: Orthoptera
- Suborder: Caelifera
- Infraorder: Acrididea
- Nanorder: Acridomorpha
- Superfamily: Acridoidea; MacLeay, 1821

Families
- See Classification.

Synonyms
- Acridina MacLeay, 1821; Acridiodea MacLeay, 1821; Akridiodea; Pamphagoidea Burmeister, 1840

= Acridoidea =

Superfamily of grasshoppers

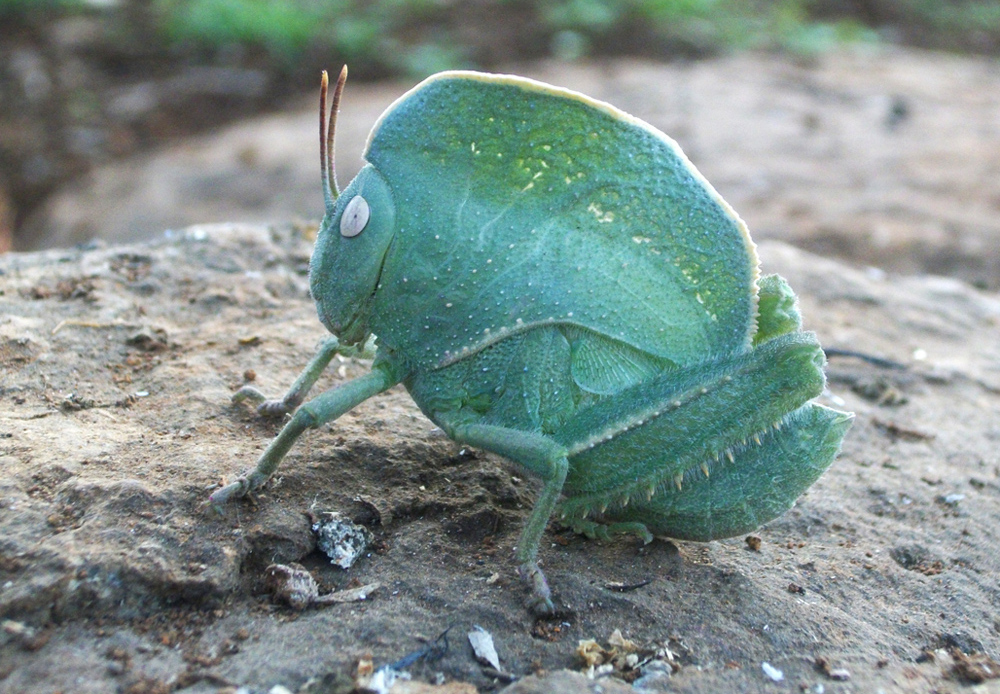
Teratodes monticollis

Acridoidea is the largest superfamily of grasshoppers in the order Orthoptera with over 11,000 species found on every continent except Antarctica.

== Classification ==
Orthoptera Species File includes the following families:

- Acrididae MacLeay, 1821
- Dericorythidae Jacobson & Bianchi, 1905
- Lathiceridae Dirsh, 1954
- Lentulidae Dirsh, 1956: now includes Lithidiidae Dirsh, 1961
- Ommexechidae Bolívar, 1884
- Pamphagidae Burmeister, 1840
- Pamphagodidae Bolívar, 1884
- Pyrgacrididae Kevan, 1974
- Romaleidae Pictet & Saussure, 1887
- Tristiridae Rehn, 1906

incertae sedis

- Microtmethis Karny, 1910 (monotypic)

== Chromosomes ==
Among the families Acrididae, Ommexechidae and Romaleidae there is reported to be chromosomal stability with a high frequency of species harbouring diploid number (2n) of 23♂/24♀ chromosomes. In species of Acrididae and Romaleidae it is common to have acrocentric chromosomes with a fundamental number (FN), i.e. number of chromosome arms, of 23♂/24♀. However, chromosomal rearrangements are frequently found as deviations from the standard acrocentric karyotype. In the subfamily Ommexechinae most species show a unique karyotype (2n = 23♂/24♀, FN = 25♂/26♀) due to the occurrence of a large autosomal pair (L1) with submetacentric morphology. There is some support for 'Mesa's hypothesis' of an ancestral pericentric inversion in the ancestor of Ommexechinae to explain this karyotype variation.
