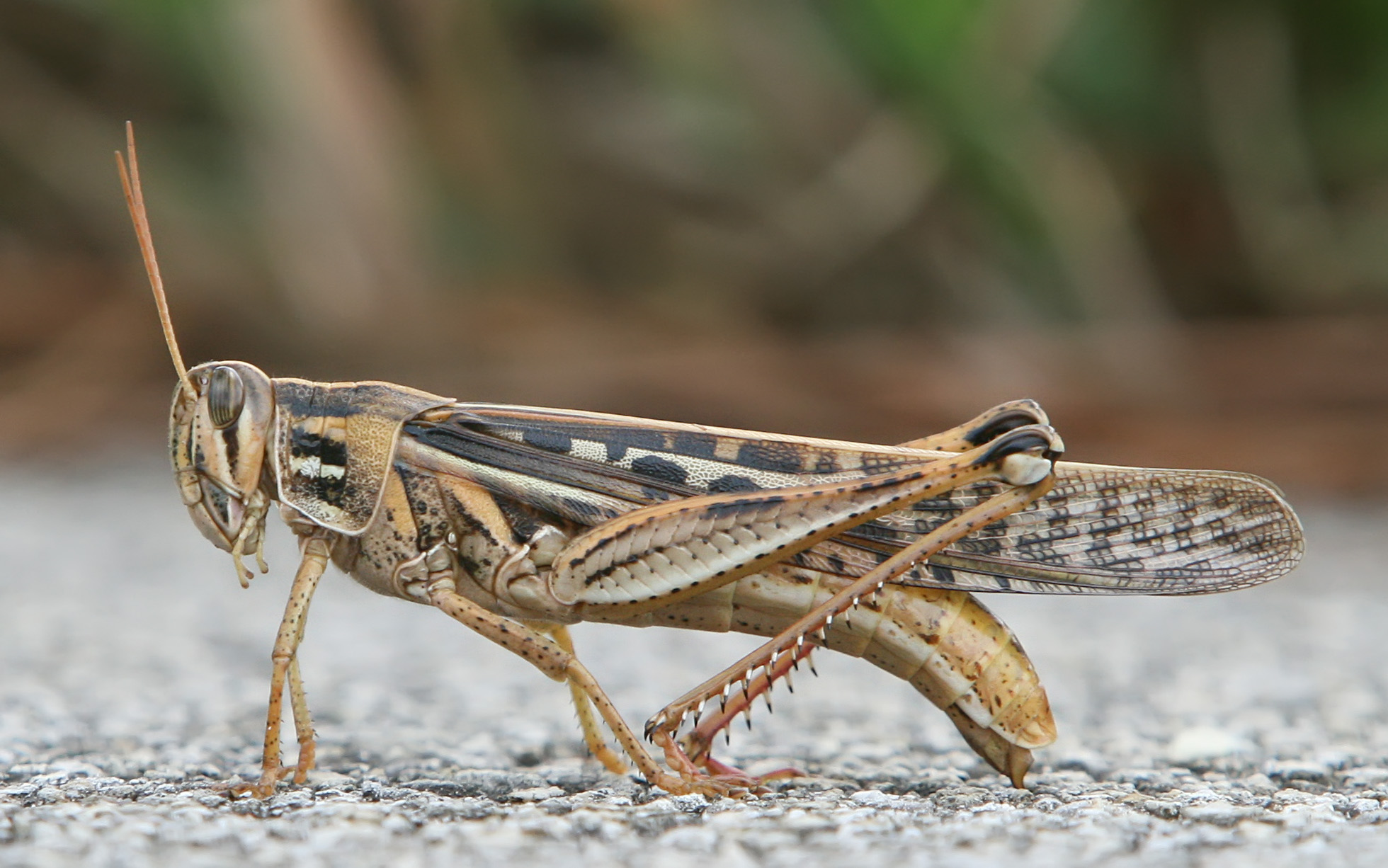
- American grasshopper (Schistocerca americana)

Scientific classification
- Kingdom: Animalia
- Phylum: Arthropoda
- Clade: Pancrustacea
- Class: Insecta
- Order: Orthoptera
- Suborder: Caelifera
- Infraorder: Acrididea
- Nanorder: Acridomorpha; MacLeay, 1821

Superfamilies
- Acridoidea; Eumastacoidea; Pneumoroidea; Proscopioidea; Pyrgomorphoidea; Tanaoceroidea; Trigonopterygoidea

= Grasshopper =

Grasshopper Temporal range: Induan–Holocene, 250–0 Ma

Common name for a group of insects

Grasshoppers are a group of insects belonging to the suborder Caelifera. They are amongst what are possibly the most ancient living groups of chewing herbivorous insects, dating back to the early Triassic, around 250 million years ago.

Grasshoppers are typically ground-dwelling insects with powerful hind legs which allow them to escape from threats by leaping vigorously. Their front legs are shorter and used for grasping food. As hemimetabolous insects, they do not undergo complete metamorphosis; they hatch from an egg into a nymph or "hopper" which undergoes five moults, becoming more similar to the adult insect at each developmental stage. The grasshopper hears through the tympanal organ which can be found in the first segment of the abdomen attached to the thorax; while its sense of vision is in the compound eyes, a change in light intensity is perceived in the simple eyes (ocelli). At high population densities and under certain environmental conditions, some grasshopper species can change colour and behavior and form swarms. Under these circumstances, they are known as locusts.

Grasshoppers are plant-eaters, with a few species at times becoming serious pests of cereals, vegetables and pasture, especially when they swarm in the millions as locusts and destroy crops over wide areas. They protect themselves from predators by camouflage; when detected, many species attempt to startle the predator with a brilliantly coloured wing flash while jumping and launching themselves into the air, usually flying for only a short distance. Other species such as the rainbow grasshopper have warning coloration which deters predators. Grasshoppers are affected by parasites and various diseases, and many predatory creatures feed on both nymphs and adults. The eggs are subject to attack by parasitoids and predators. Grasshoppers are diurnal insects, meaning they are most active during the day time.

Grasshoppers have had a long relationship with humans. Swarms of locusts can have devastating effects and cause famine, having done so since Biblical times. Even in smaller numbers, the insects can be serious pests. They are used as food in countries such as Mexico and Indonesia. They feature in art, symbolism and literature. The study of grasshopper species is called acridology.

== Phylogeny ==
Grasshoppers belong to the suborder Caelifera. Although "grasshopper" has been used as a common name for the suborder in general, modern sources restrict it to the more "evolved" families. They may be placed in the infraorder Acrididea and have been referred to as "short-horned grasshoppers" in older texts to distinguish them from the also-obsolete term "long-horned grasshoppers" (now bush-crickets or katydids) with their much longer antennae. The phylogeny of Caelifera, based on mitochondrial ribosomal RNA of thirty-two taxa in six out of seven superfamilies, is shown as a cladogram. Ensifera, Caelifera, and all the superfamilies of grasshoppers except "Pamphagoidea" appear to be monophyletic.

- Orthoptera
  - Ensifera crickets, katydids, etc.
    [6 superfamilies]
  - Caelifera
    - Tridactyloidea pygmy mole crickets
    - - Tetrigoidea groundhoppers
      - Acrididea grasshoppers
        - Eumastacoidea
        - - Proscopioidea
          - - Pneumoroidea
            - - Pyrgomorphoidea
              - Acridoidea

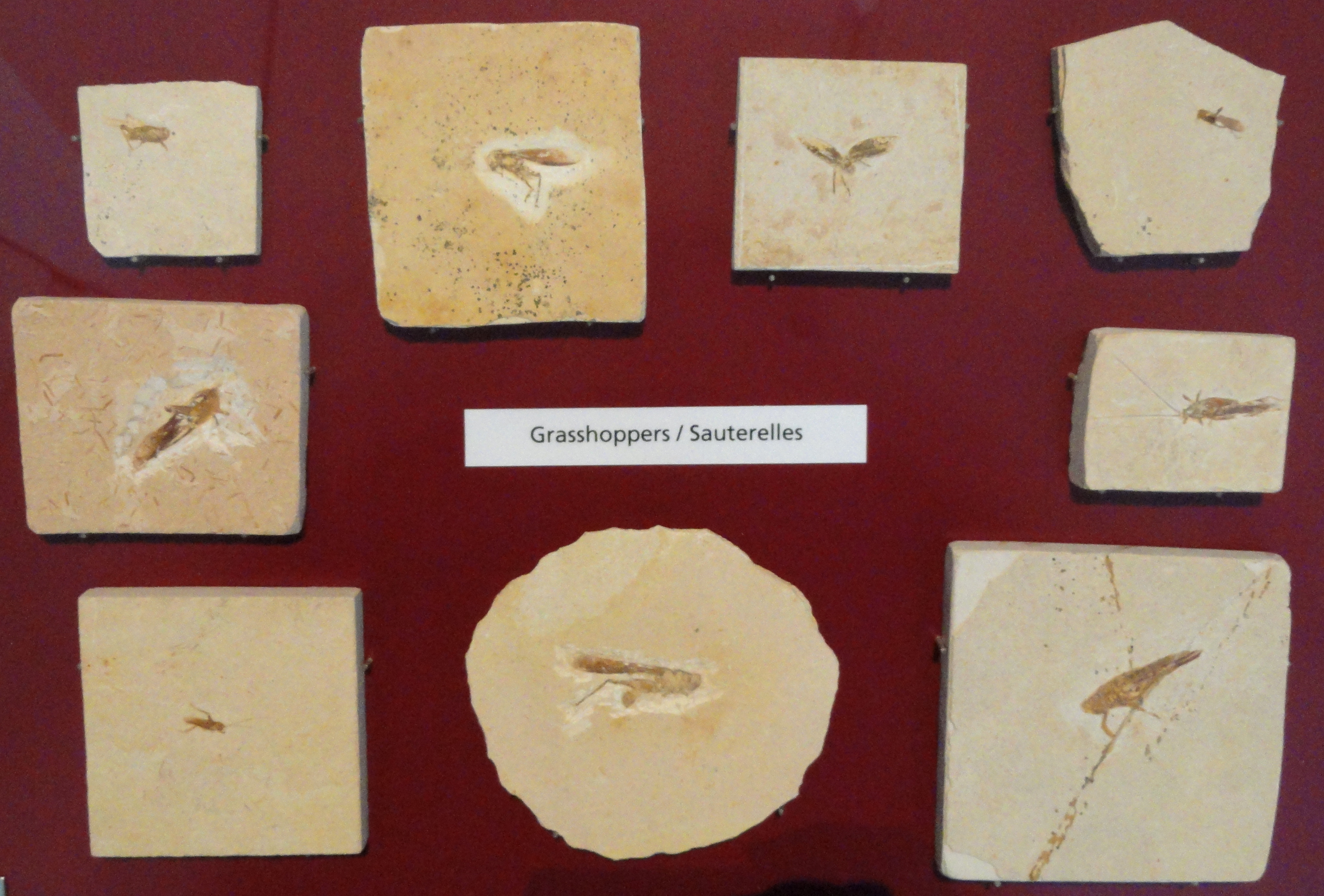
Fossil grasshoppers at the Royal Ontario Museum

In evolutionary terms, the split between the Caelifera and the Ensifera is no more recent than the Permo-Triassic boundary; the earliest insects that are certainly Caeliferans are in the extinct families Locustopseidae and Locustavidae from the early Triassic, roughly 250 million years ago. The group diversified during the Triassic and have remained important plant-eaters from that time to now. The first modern families such as the Eumastacidae, Tetrigidae and Tridactylidae appeared in the Cretaceous, though some insects that might belong to the last two of these groups are found in the early Jurassic. Morphological classification is difficult because many taxa have converged towards a common habitat type; recent taxonomists have concentrated on the internal genitalia, especially those of the male. This information is not available from fossil specimens, and the palaeontological taxonomy is founded principally on the venation of the hindwings.

The Caelifera includes some 2,400 valid genera and about 11,000 known species. Many undescribed species probably exist, especially in tropical wet forests. The Caelifera have a predominantly tropical distribution with fewer species known from temperate zones, but most of the superfamilies have representatives worldwide. They are almost exclusively herbivorous and are probably the oldest living group of chewing herbivorous insects.

The most diverse superfamily is the Acridoidea, with around 8,000 species. The two main families in this are the Acrididae (grasshoppers and locusts) with a worldwide distribution, and the Romaleidae (lubber grasshoppers), found chiefly in the New World. The Ommexechidae and Tristiridae are South American, and the Lentulidae, Lithidiidae and Pamphagidae are mainly African. The Pauliniids are nocturnal and can swim or skate on water, and the Lentulids are wingless. Pneumoridae are native to Africa, particularly southern Africa, and are distinguished by the inflated abdomens of the males.

== Characteristics ==
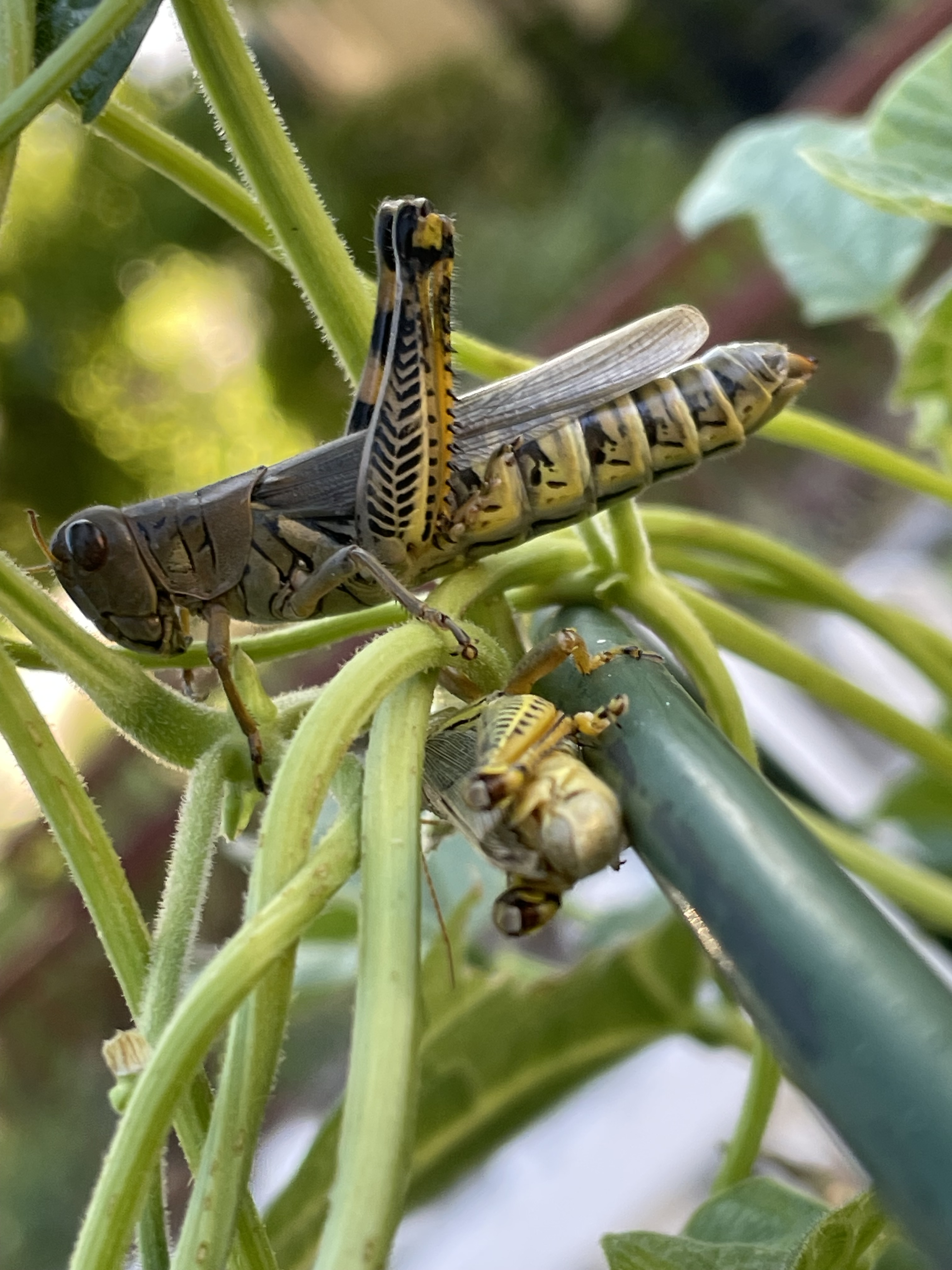
Two differential grasshoppers, with spines along the tibia of the hind legs

Grasshoppers have the typical insect body plan of head, thorax, and abdomen. The head is held vertically at an angle to the body, with the mouth at the bottom. The head bears a large pair of compound eyes which give all-round vision, three simple eyes which can detect light and dark, and a pair of thread-like antennae that are sensitive to touch and smell. They have two strong hind legs that propel them in the air to escape predators. The downward-directed mouthparts are modified for chewing and there are two sensory palps in front of the jaws.

The thorax and abdomen are segmented and have a rigid cuticle made up of overlapping plates composed of chitin. The three fused thoracic segments bear three pairs of legs and two pairs of wings. The forewings, known as tegmina, are narrow and leathery while the hindwings are large and membranous, the veins providing strength. The legs are terminated by claws for gripping. The hind leg is particularly powerful. The legs of these species are so powerful that they can jump quite a long distance; they also use this to flee from danger. The femur is robust and has several ridges where different surfaces join and the inner ridges bear stridulatory pegs in some species. The posterior edge of the tibia bears a double row of spines and there are a pair of articulated spurs near its lower end. The interior of the thorax houses the muscles that control the wings and legs.

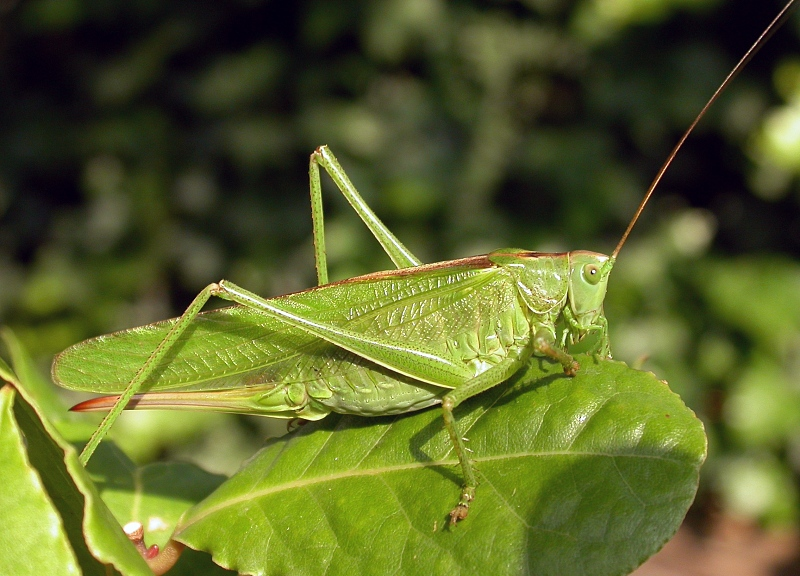
Ensifera, like this great green bush-cricket Tettigonia viridissima, somewhat resemble grasshoppers but have over 20 segments in their antennae and different ovipositors.

The abdomen has eleven segments, the first of which is fused to the thorax and contains the tympanal organ and hearing system. Segments two to eight are ring-shaped and joined by flexible membranes. Segments nine to eleven are reduced in size; segment nine bears a pair of cerci and segments ten and eleven have the reproductive organs. Female grasshoppers are normally larger than males, with short ovipositors. The name of the suborder "Caelifera" comes from the Latin and means chisel-bearing, referring to the shape of the ovipositor.

The grasshopper's auditory organs are located on its abdomen, rather than on its head. These organs consist of a pair of membranes, each positioned on either side of the first abdominal segment and tucked under the wings. Known as tympanal organs, these simple eardrums vibrate in response to sound waves, enabling the grasshopper to hear the songs of other grasshoppers.

Those species that make easily heard noises usually do so by rubbing a row of pegs on the hind legs against the edges of the forewings; this behavior is called stridulation. Stridulation is produced mainly by males to attract females, though in some species the females also stridulate. Others, like the Crackling Forest Grasshopper, produce distinctive clicks while flying; this behavior is called crepitation.

Grasshoppers may be confused with crickets, but they differ in many aspects; these include the number of segments in their antennae and the structure of the ovipositor, as well as the location of the tympanal organ and the methods by which sound is produced. Ensiferans have antennae that can be much longer than the body and have at least 20–24 segments, while caeliferans have fewer segments in their shorter, stouter antennae.

== Biology ==
=== Diet and digestion ===
Structure of mouthparts

Most grasshoppers are polyphagous, eating vegetation from multiple plant sources e.g pea plant leaves , but some are omnivorous and also eat animal tissue and animal meat. They also like to eat other insects. In general their preference is for grasses, including many cereals grown as crops. The digestive system is typical of insects, with Malpighian tubules discharging into the midgut. Carbohydrates are digested mainly in the crop, while proteins are digested in the ceca of the midgut. Saliva is abundant but largely free of enzymes, helping to move food and Malpighian secretions along the gut. Some grasshoppers possess cellulase, which by softening plant cell walls makes plant cell contents accessible to other digestive enzymes. Grasshoppers can also be cannibalistic when swarming.

=== Sensory organs ===
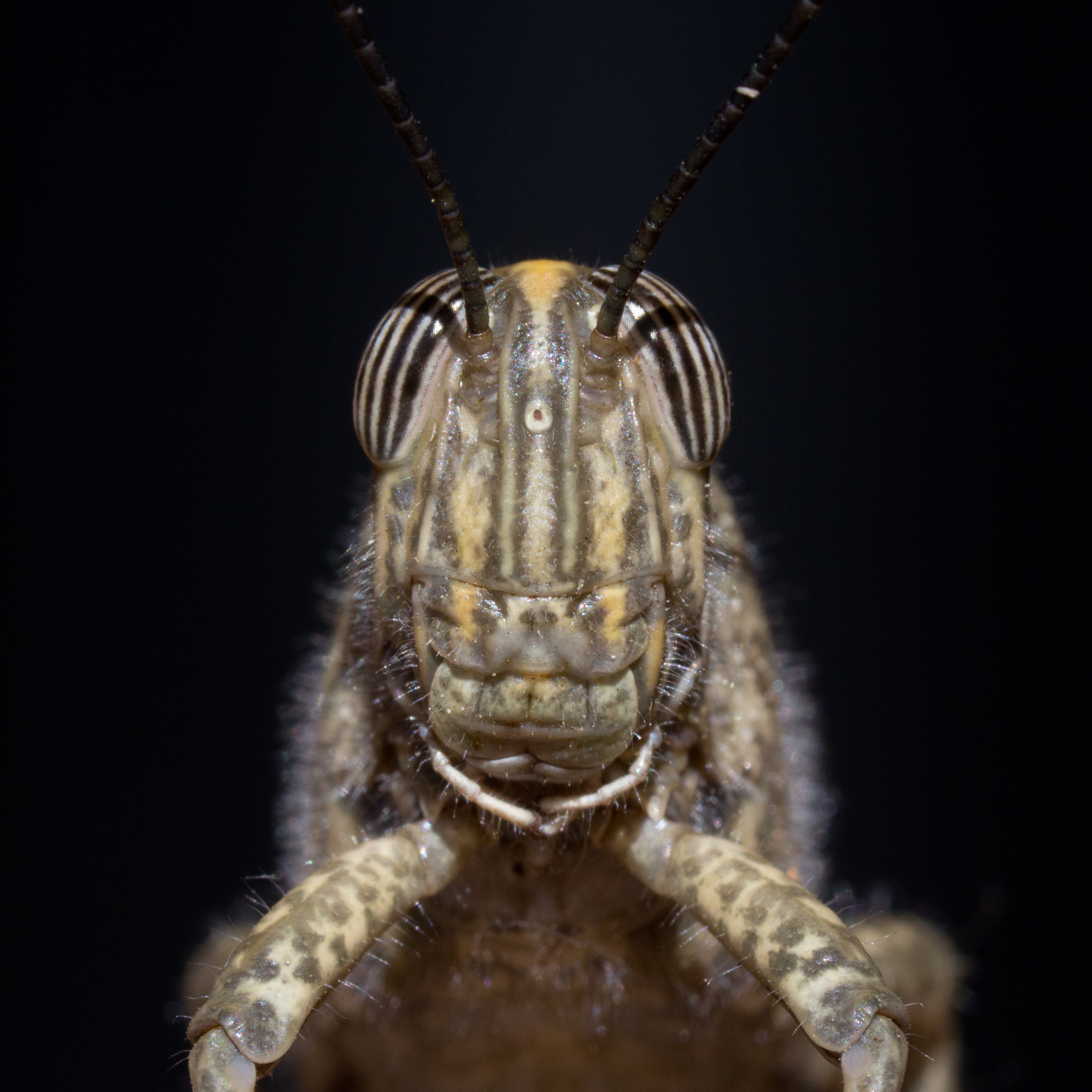
Frontal view of Egyptian locust (Anacridium aegyptium) showing the compound eyes, tiny ocelli and numerous setae

Grasshoppers have a typical insect nervous system, and have an extensive set of external sense organs. On the side of the head are a pair of large compound eyes which give a broad field of vision and can detect movement, shape, colour and distance. There are also three simple eyes (ocelli) on the forehead which can detect light intensity, a pair of antennae containing olfactory (smell) and touch receptors, and mouthparts containing gustatory (taste) receptors. At the front end of the abdomen there is a pair of tympanal organs for sound reception. There are numerous fine hairs (setae) covering the whole body that act as mechanoreceptors (touch and wind sensors), and these are most dense on the antennae, the palps (part of the mouth), and on the cerci at the tip of the abdomen. There are special receptors (campaniform sensillae) embedded in the cuticle of the legs that sense pressure and cuticle distortion. There are internal "chordotonal" sense organs specialized to detect position and movement about the joints of the exoskeleton. The receptors convey information to the central nervous system through sensory neurons, and most of these have their cell bodies located in the periphery near the receptor site itself.

=== Circulation and respiration ===
Like other insects, grasshoppers have an open circulatory system and their body cavities are filled with haemolymph. A heart-like structure in the upper part of the abdomen pumps the fluid to the head from where it percolates past the tissues and organs on its way back to the abdomen. This system circulates nutrients throughout the body and carries metabolic wastes to be excreted into the gut. Other functions of the haemolymph include wound healing, heat transfer and the provision of hydrostatic pressure, but the circulatory system is not involved in gaseous exchange. Respiration is performed using tracheae, air-filled tubes, which open at the surfaces of the thorax and abdomen through pairs of valved spiracles. Larger insects may need to actively ventilate their bodies by opening some spiracles while others remain closed, using abdominal muscles to expand and contract the body and pump air through the system.

=== Jumping ===
Grasshoppers store energy for a jump, overcoming the limitations of muscle which cannot contract powerfully and quickly at the same time. Representations of structure are diagrammatic.

Grasshoppers jump by extending their large back legs and pushing against the substrate (the ground, a twig, a blade of grass or whatever else they are standing on); the reaction force propels them into the air. A large grasshopper, such as a locust, can jump about a metre (20 body lengths) without using its wings; the acceleration peaks at about 20 g.

They jump for several reasons: to escape from a predator, to launch themselves into flight, or simply to move from place to place. For the escape jump in particular there is strong selective pressure to maximize take-off velocity, since this determines the range. This means that the legs must thrust against the ground with both high force and a high velocity of movement. A fundamental property of muscle is that it cannot contract with high force and high velocity at the same time. Grasshoppers overcome this by using a catapult mechanism to amplify the mechanical power produced by their muscles.

The jump is a three-stage process. First, the grasshopper fully flexes the lower part of the leg (tibia) against the upper part (femur) by activating the flexor tibiae muscle (the back legs of the grasshopper in the top photograph are in this preparatory position). Second, there is a period of co-contraction in which force builds up in the large, pennate extensor tibiae muscle, but the tibia is kept flexed by the simultaneous contraction of the flexor tibiae muscle. The extensor muscle is much stronger than the flexor muscle, but the latter is aided by specialisations in the joint, giving it a large effective mechanical advantage over the former when the tibia is fully flexed. Co-contraction can last for up to half a second, and during this period the extensor muscle shortens and stores elastic strain energy by distorting stiff cuticular structures in the leg. The extensor muscle contraction is quite slow (almost isometric), allowing it to develop high force (up to 14 N in the desert locust), but because it is slow, only low power is needed. The third stage of the jump is the trigger relaxation of the flexor muscle, releasing the tibia from the flexed position. The subsequent rapid tibial extension is driven mainly by the relaxation of the elastic structures, rather than by further shortening of the extensor muscle. In this way the stiff cuticle acts like the elastic of a catapult, or the bow of a bow-and-arrow. Energy is put into the store at low power by slow but strong muscle contraction and retrieved from the store at high power by rapid relaxation of the mechanical elastic structures.

=== Stridulation ===
Grasshopper stridulation
Several unidentified grasshoppers stridulating

Male grasshoppers spend much of the day stridulating, singing more actively under optimal conditions and being more subdued when conditions are adverse; females also stridulate, but their efforts are insignificant when compared to the males. Late-stage male nymphs can sometimes be seen making stridulatory movements, although they lack the equipment to make sounds, demonstrating the importance of this behavioural trait. The songs are a means of communication; the male stridulation seems to express reproductive maturity, the desire for social cohesion and individual well-being. Social cohesion becomes necessary among grasshoppers because of their ability to jump or fly large distances, and the song can serve to limit dispersal and guide others to favourable habitat. The generalised song can vary in phraseology and intensity, and is modified in the presence of a rival male, and changes again to a courtship song when a female is nearby. In male grasshoppers of the family Pneumoridae, the enlarged abdomen amplifies stridulation.

=== Life cycle ===
Six stages (instars) of development, from newly hatched nymph to fully winged adult

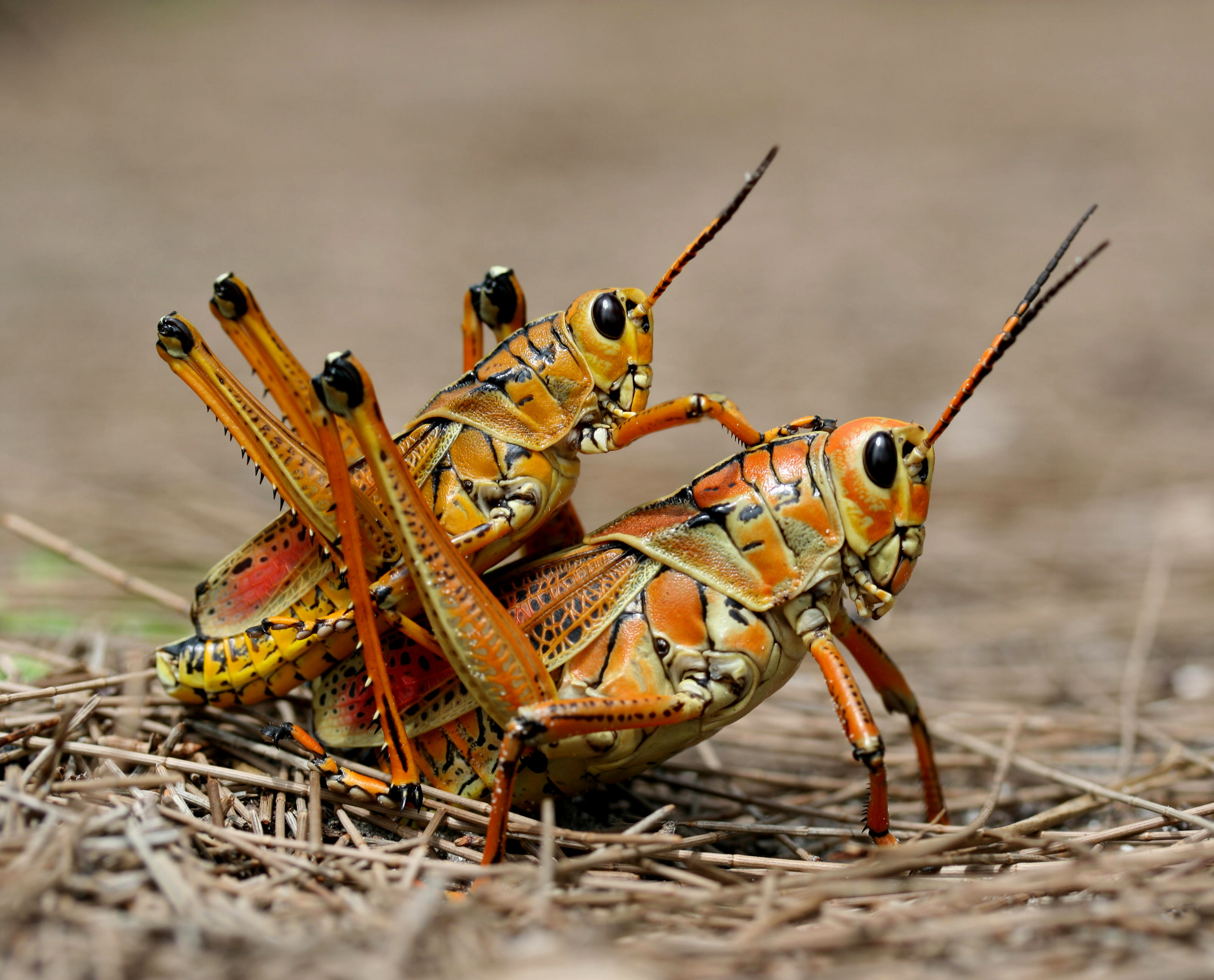
Romalea microptera grasshoppers: female (larger) is laying eggs, with male in attendance.

In most grasshopper species, conflicts between males over females rarely escalate beyond ritualistic displays. Some exceptions include the chameleon grasshopper (Kosciuscola tristis), where males may fight on top of ovipositing females; engaging in leg grappling, biting, kicking and mounting.

Female grasshoppers of the species Chorthippus biguttulus appear to be able to integrate information from male calling songs. An unattractive song subunit far outweighs an attractive song subunit, and this asymmetrical integration is consistent with theories of sexual selection because it helps females avoid potentially costly interaction with unsuitable mating partners if the song belongs to another species or indicates a low-quality male.

The newly emerged female grasshopper has a preoviposition period of a week or two while she increases in weight and her eggs mature. After mating, the female of most species digs a hole with her ovipositor and lays a batch of eggs in a pod in the ground near food plants, generally in the summer. After laying the eggs, she covers the hole with soil and litter. Some, like the semi-aquatic Cornops aquaticum, deposit the pod directly into plant tissue. The eggs in the pod are glued together with a froth in some species. After a few weeks of development, the eggs of most species in temperate climates go into diapause, and pass the winter in this state. Diapause is broken by a sufficiently low ground temperature, with development resuming as soon as the ground warms above a certain threshold temperature. The embryos in a pod generally all hatch out within a few minutes of each other. They soon shed their membranes and their exoskeletons harden. These first instar nymphs can then jump away from predators.

Grasshoppers undergo incomplete metamorphosis: they repeatedly moult, each instar becoming larger and more like an adult, with the wing-buds increasing in size at each stage. The number of instars varies between species but is often six. After the final moult, the wings are inflated and become fully functional. The migratory grasshopper, Melanoplus sanguinipes, spends about 25 to 30 days as a nymph, depending on sex and temperature, and lives for about 51 days as an adult.

=== Swarming ===
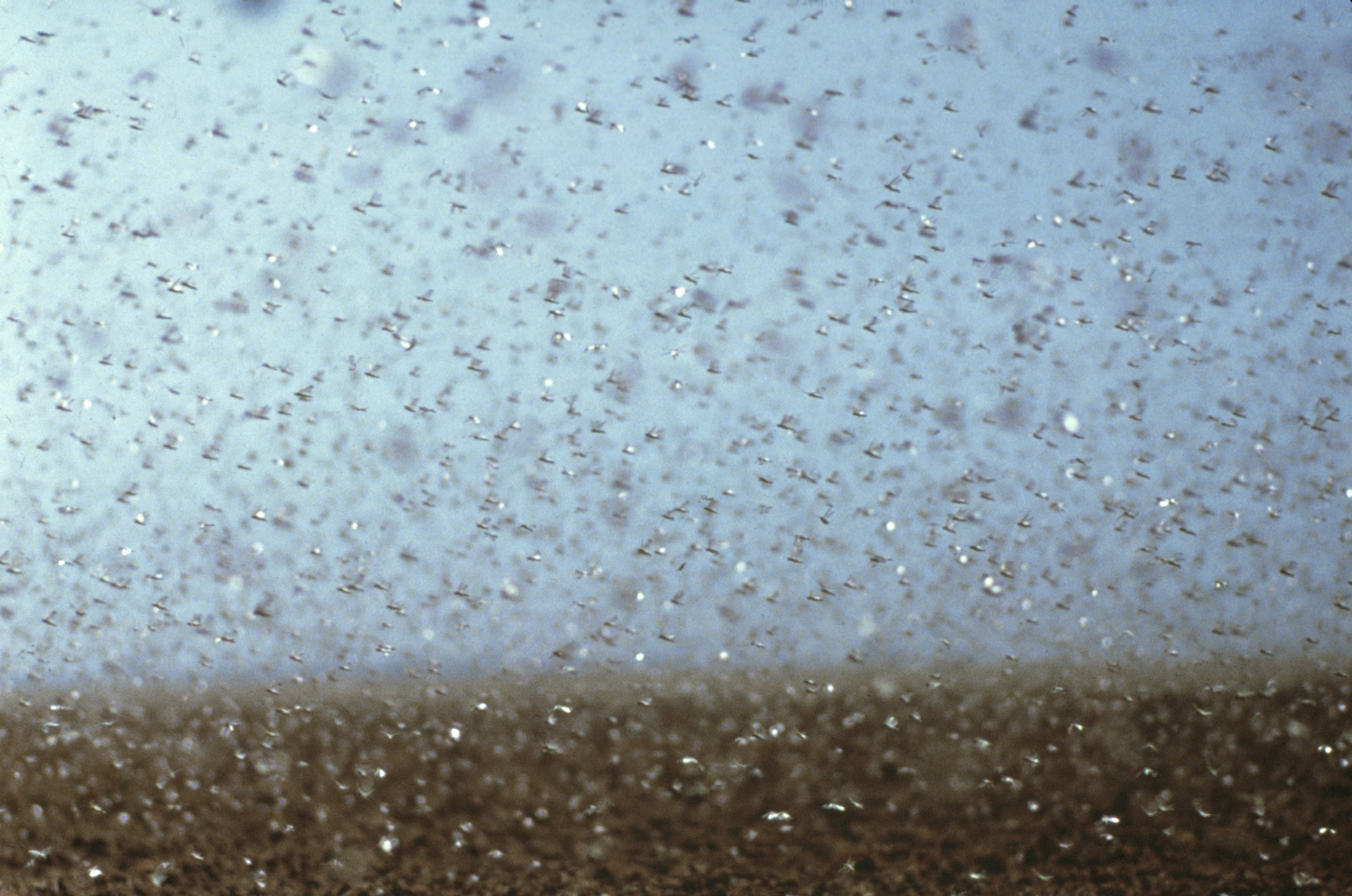
Millions of plague locusts on the move in Australia

Locusts are the swarming phase of certain species of short-horned grasshoppers in the family Acrididae. Swarming behaviour is a response to overcrowding. Increased tactile stimulation of the hind legs causes an increase in levels of serotonin. This causes the grasshopper to change colour, feed more and breed faster. The transformation of a solitary individual into a swarming one is induced by several contacts per minute over a short period.

Following this transformation, under suitable conditions dense nomadic bands of flightless nymphs known as "hoppers" can occur, producing pheromones which attract the insects to each other. With several generations in a year, the locust population can build up from localised groups into vast accumulations of flying insects known as plagues, devouring all the vegetation they encounter. The largest recorded locust swarm was one formed by the now-extinct Rocky Mountain locust in 1875; the swarm was 1,800 miles (2,900 km) long and 110 miles (180 km) wide, and one estimate puts the number of locusts involved at 3.5 trillion. An adult desert locust can eat about 2 g (0.1 oz) of plant material each day, so the billions of insects in a large swarm can be very destructive, stripping all the foliage from plants in an affected area and consuming stems, flowers, fruits, seeds and bark.

== Predators, parasites, and pathogens ==
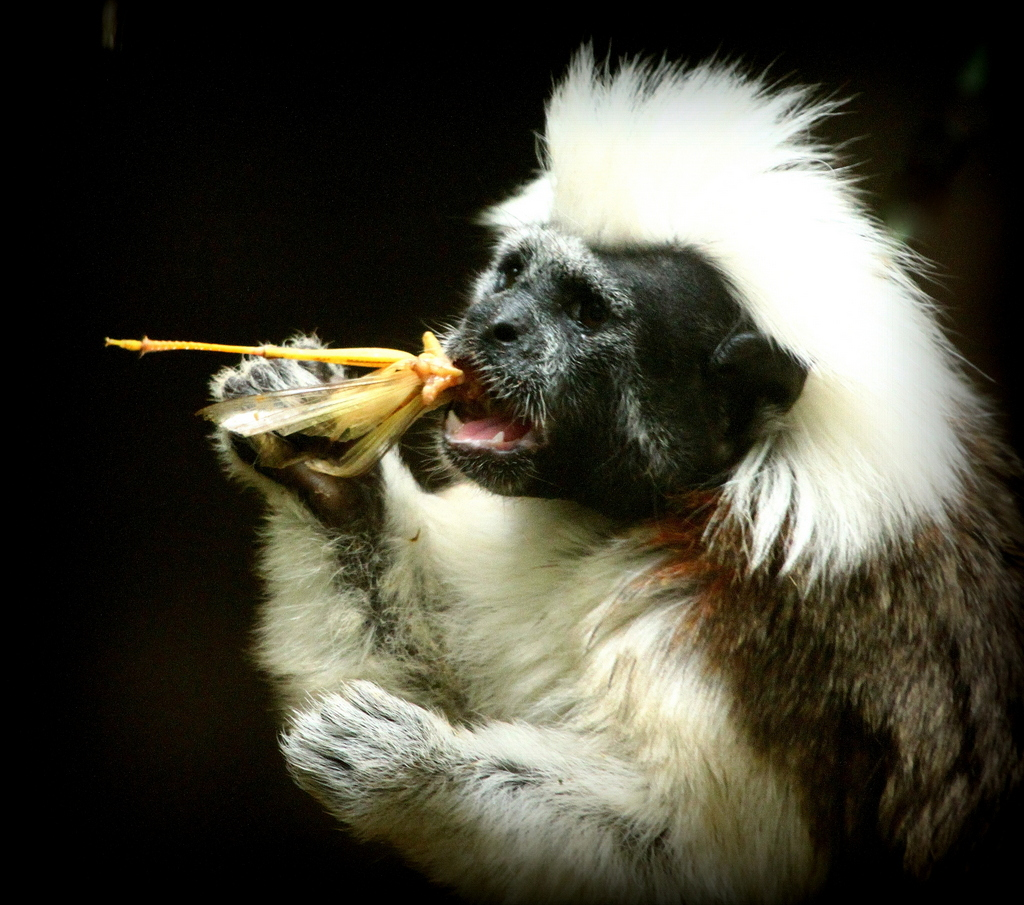
Cottontop tamarin monkey eating a grasshopper

Grasshoppers have a wide range of predators at different stages of their lives; eggs are eaten by bee-flies, ground beetles and blister beetles; hoppers and adults are taken by other insects such as ants, robber flies and sphecid wasps, by spiders, and by many birds and small mammals including dogs and cats.

The eggs and nymphs are under attack by parasitoids including blow flies, flesh flies, and tachinid flies. External parasites of adults and nymphs include mites. Female grasshoppers parasitised by mites produce fewer eggs and thus have fewer offspring than unaffected individuals.

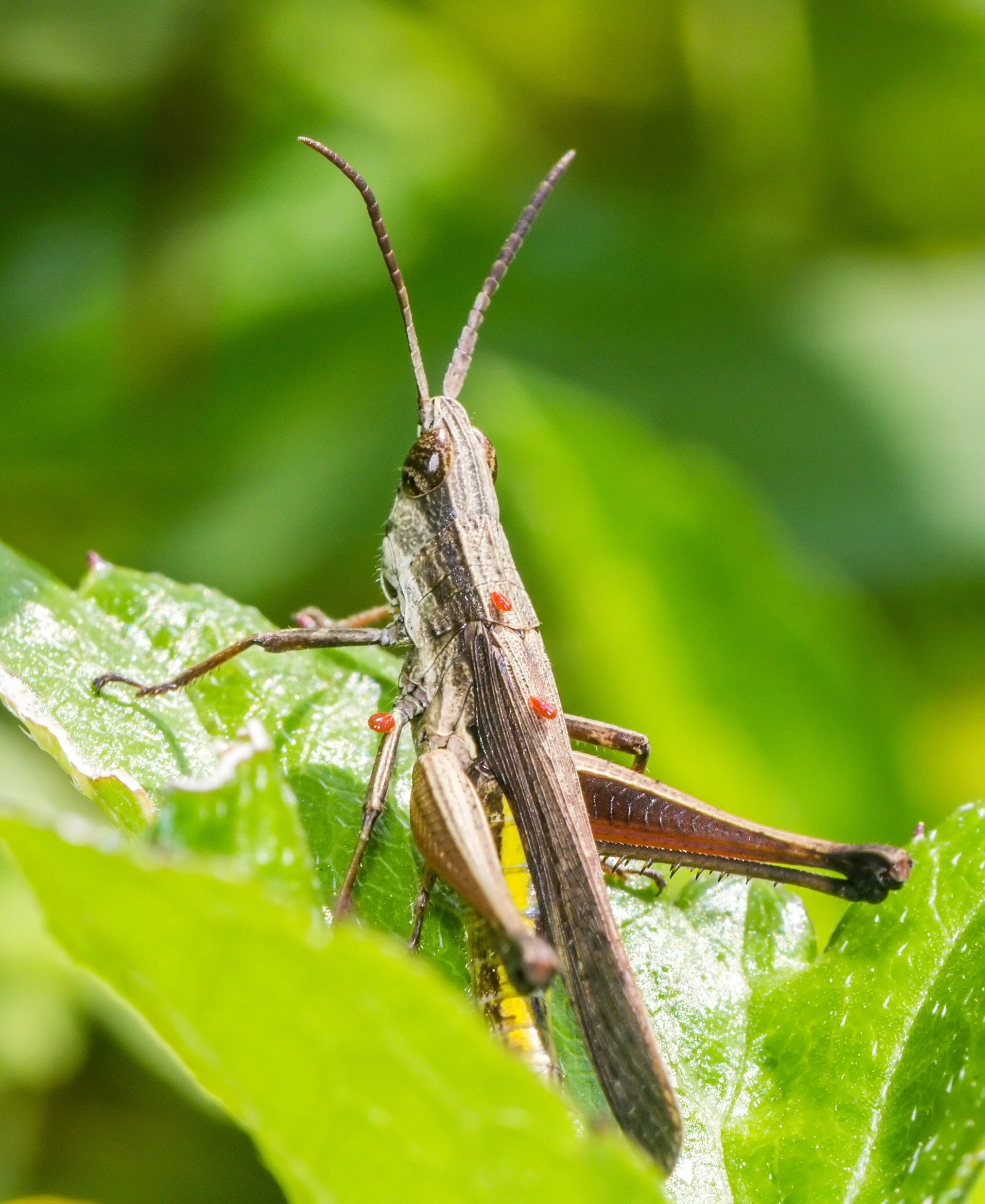
Grasshopper with parasitic mites

The grasshopper nematode (Mermis nigrescens) is a long slender worm that infects grasshoppers, living in the insects' hemocoel. Adult worms lay eggs on plants and the host becomes infected when the foliage is eaten. Spinochordodes tellinii and Paragordius tricuspidatus are parasitic worms that infect grasshoppers and alter the behaviour of their hosts. When the worms are sufficiently developed, the grasshopper is persuaded to leap into a nearby body of water where it drowns, thus enabling the parasite to continue with the next stage of its life cycle, which takes place in water.

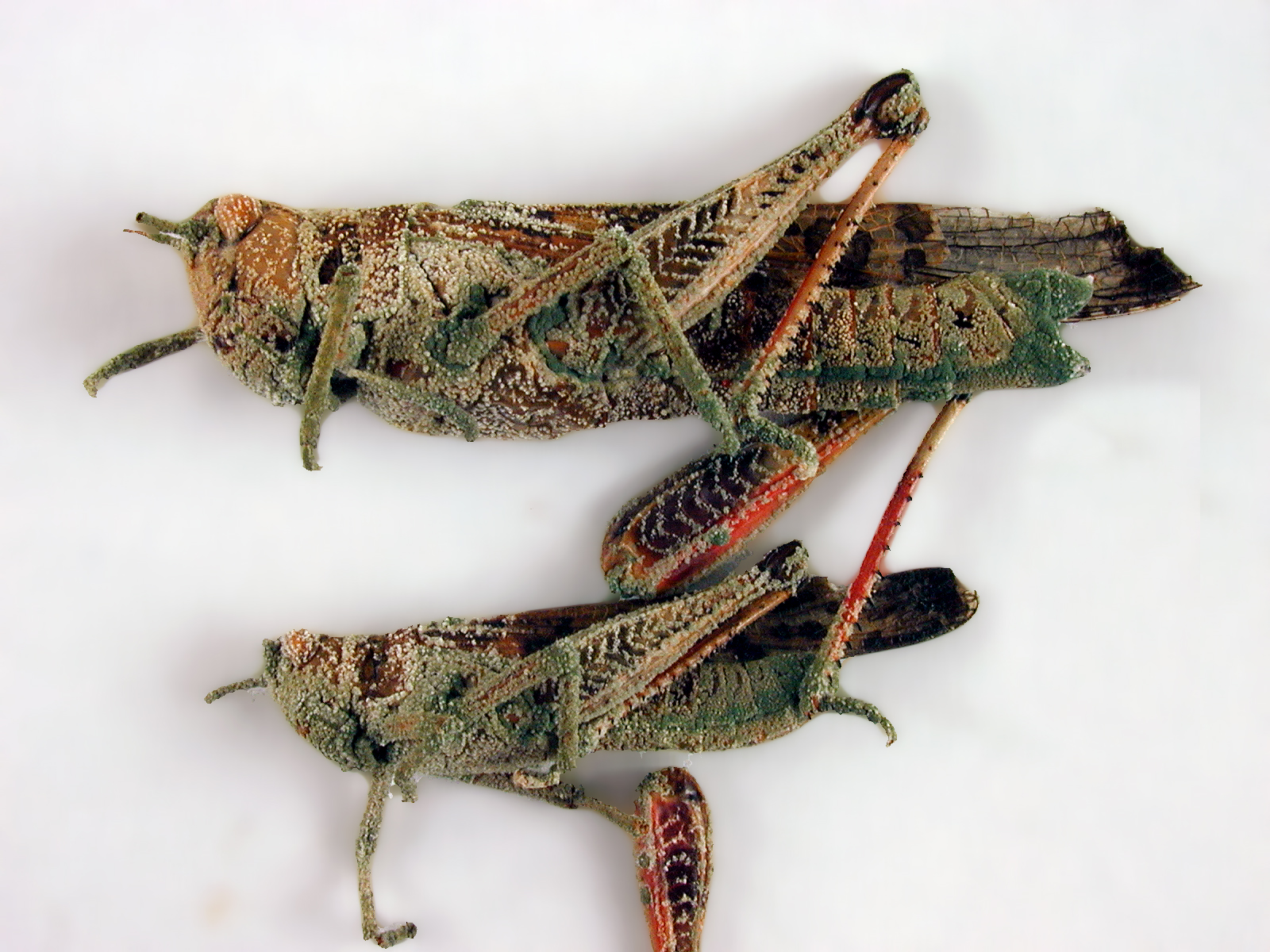
Locusts killed by the naturally occurring fungus, Metarhizium, an environmentally friendly means of biological control. CSIRO, 2005

Grasshoppers are affected by diseases caused by bacteria, viruses, fungi and protozoa. The bacteria Serratia marcescens and Pseudomonas aeruginosa have both been implicated in causing disease in grasshoppers, as has the entomopathogenic fungus Beauveria bassiana. This widespread fungus has been used to control various pest insects around the world, but although it infects grasshoppers, the infection is not usually lethal because basking in the sun has the result of raising the insects' temperature above a threshold tolerated by the fungus. The fungal pathogen Entomophaga grylli is able to influence the behaviour of its grasshopper host, causing it to climb to the top of a plant and cling to the stem as it dies. This ensures wide dispersal of the fungal spores liberated from the corpse.

The fungal pathogen Metarhizium acridum is found in Africa, Australia and Brazil where it has caused epizootics in grasshoppers. It is being investigated for possible use as a microbial insecticide for locust control. The microsporidian fungus Nosema locustae, once considered to be a protozoan, can be lethal to grasshoppers. It has to be consumed by mouth and is the basis for a bait-based commercial microbial pesticide. Various other microsporidians and protozoans are found in the gut.

=== Anti-predator defences ===
Grasshoppers exemplify a range of anti-predator adaptations, enabling them to avoid detection, to escape if detected, and in some cases to avoid being eaten if captured. Grasshoppers are often camouflaged to avoid detection by predators that hunt by sight; some species can change their coloration to suit their surroundings.

Several species such as the hooded leaf grasshopper Phyllochoreia ramakrishnai (Eumastacoidea) are detailed mimics of leaves. Stick grasshoppers (Proscopiidae) mimic wooden sticks in form and coloration. Grasshoppers often have deimatic patterns on their wings, giving a sudden flash of bright colours that may startle predators long enough to give time to escape in a combination of jump and flight.

Some species are genuinely aposematic, having both bright warning coloration and sufficient toxicity to dissuade predators. Dictyophorus productus (Pyrgomorphidae) is a "heavy, bloated, sluggish insect" that makes no attempt to hide; it has a bright red abdomen. A Cercopithecus monkey that ate other grasshoppers refused to eat the species. Another species, the rainbow or painted grasshopper of Arizona, Dactylotum bicolor (Acridoidea), has been shown by experiment with a natural predator, the little striped whiptail lizard, to be aposematic.

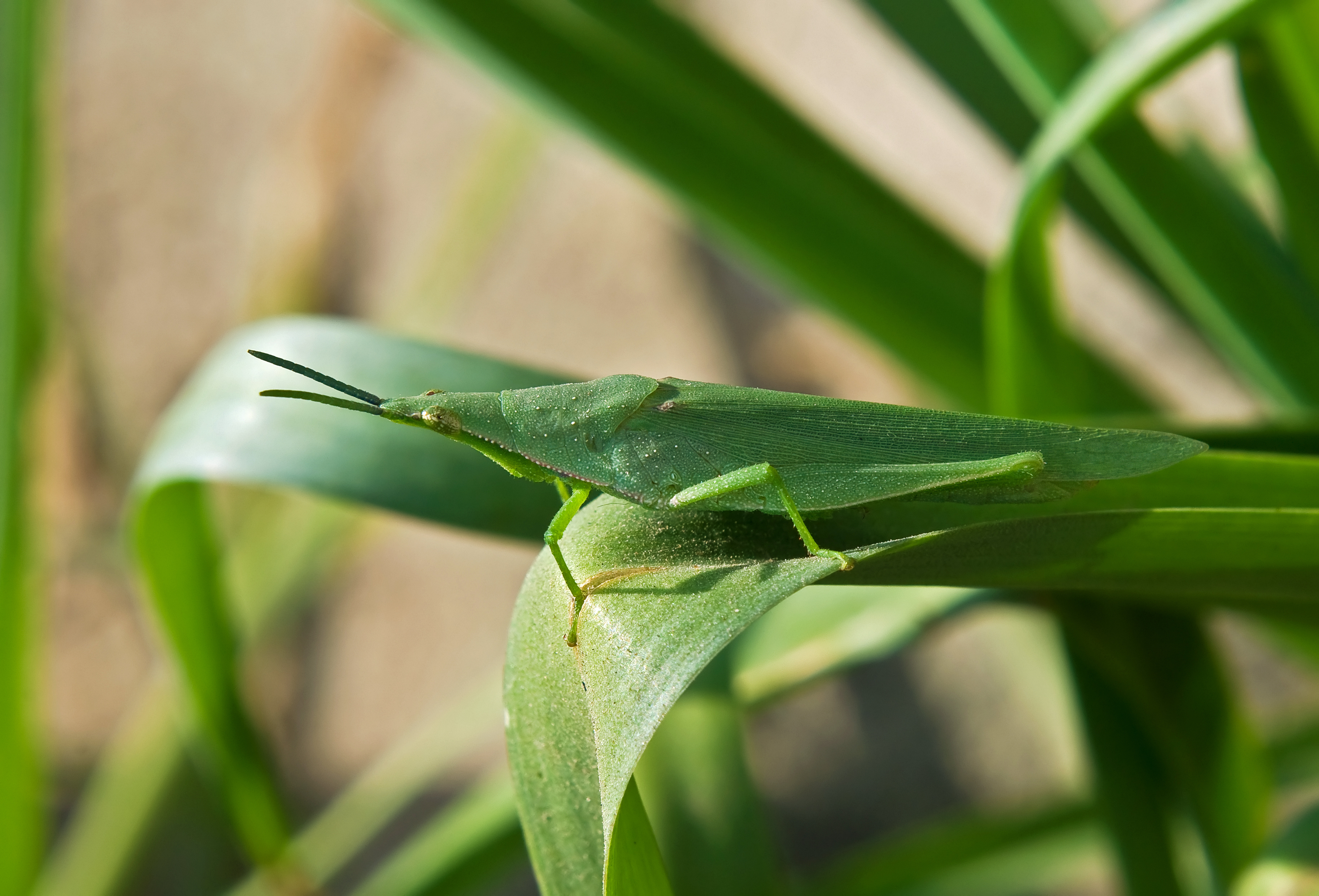
Gaudy grasshopper, Atractomorpha lata, evades predators with camouflage.

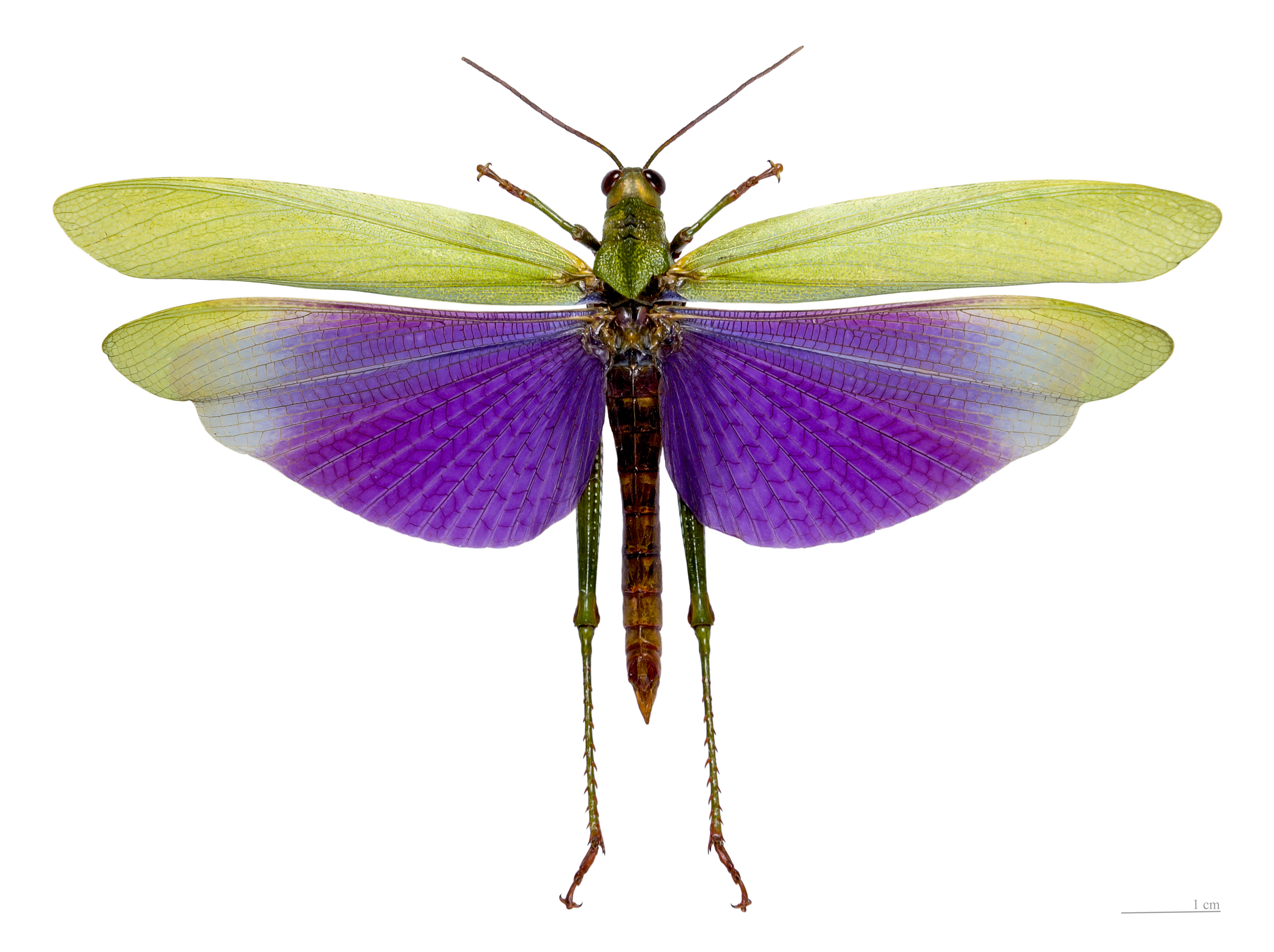
Lubber grasshopper, Titanacris albipes, has deimatically coloured wings, used to startle predators.

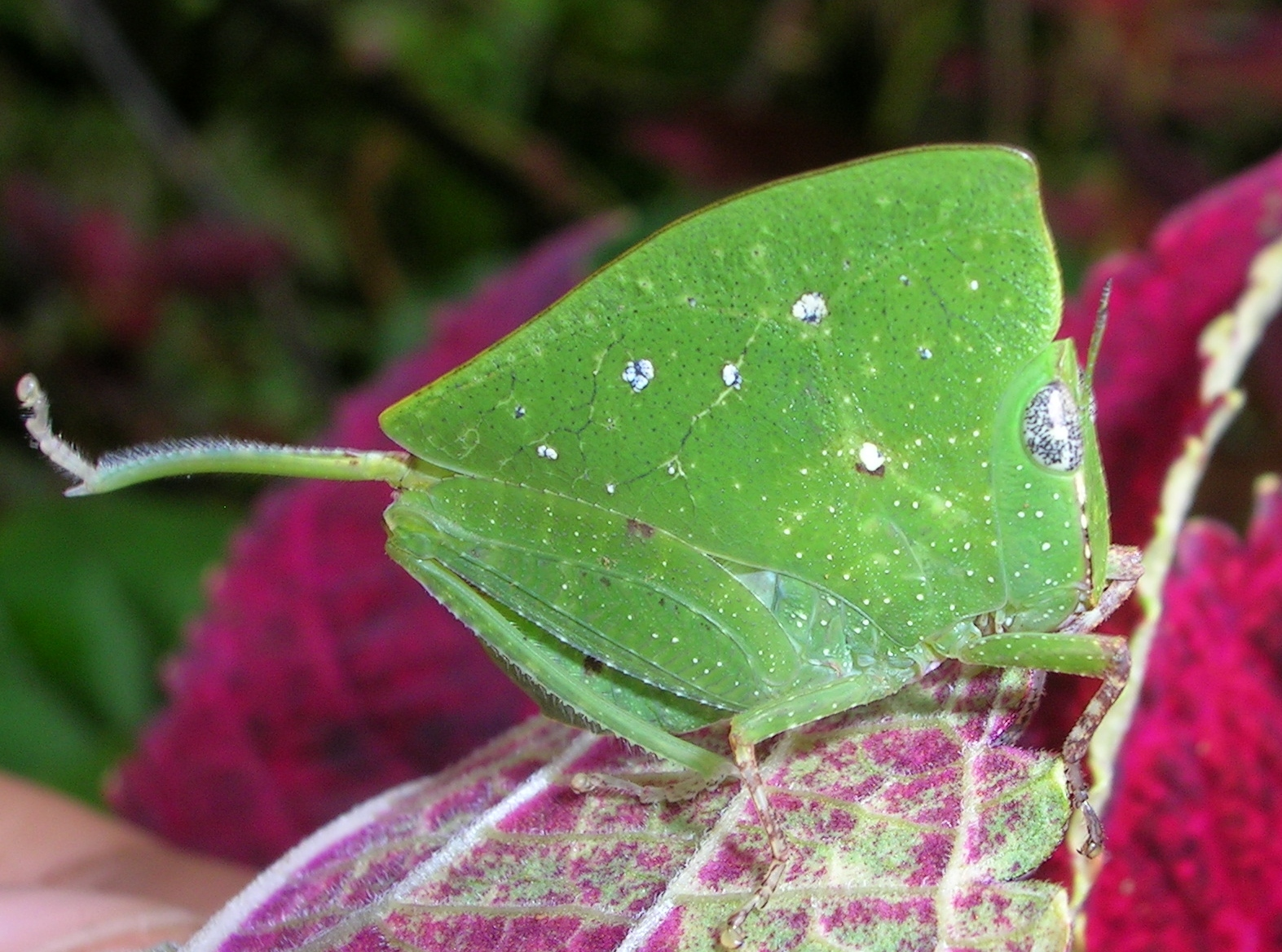
Leaf grasshopper, Phyllochoreia ramakrishnai, mimics a green leaf.

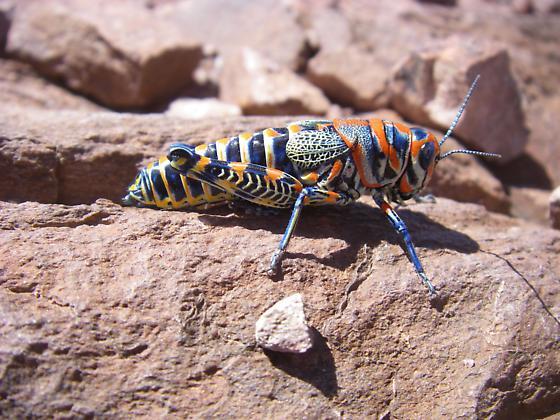
Painted grasshopper, Dactylotum bicolor, deters predators with warning coloration.

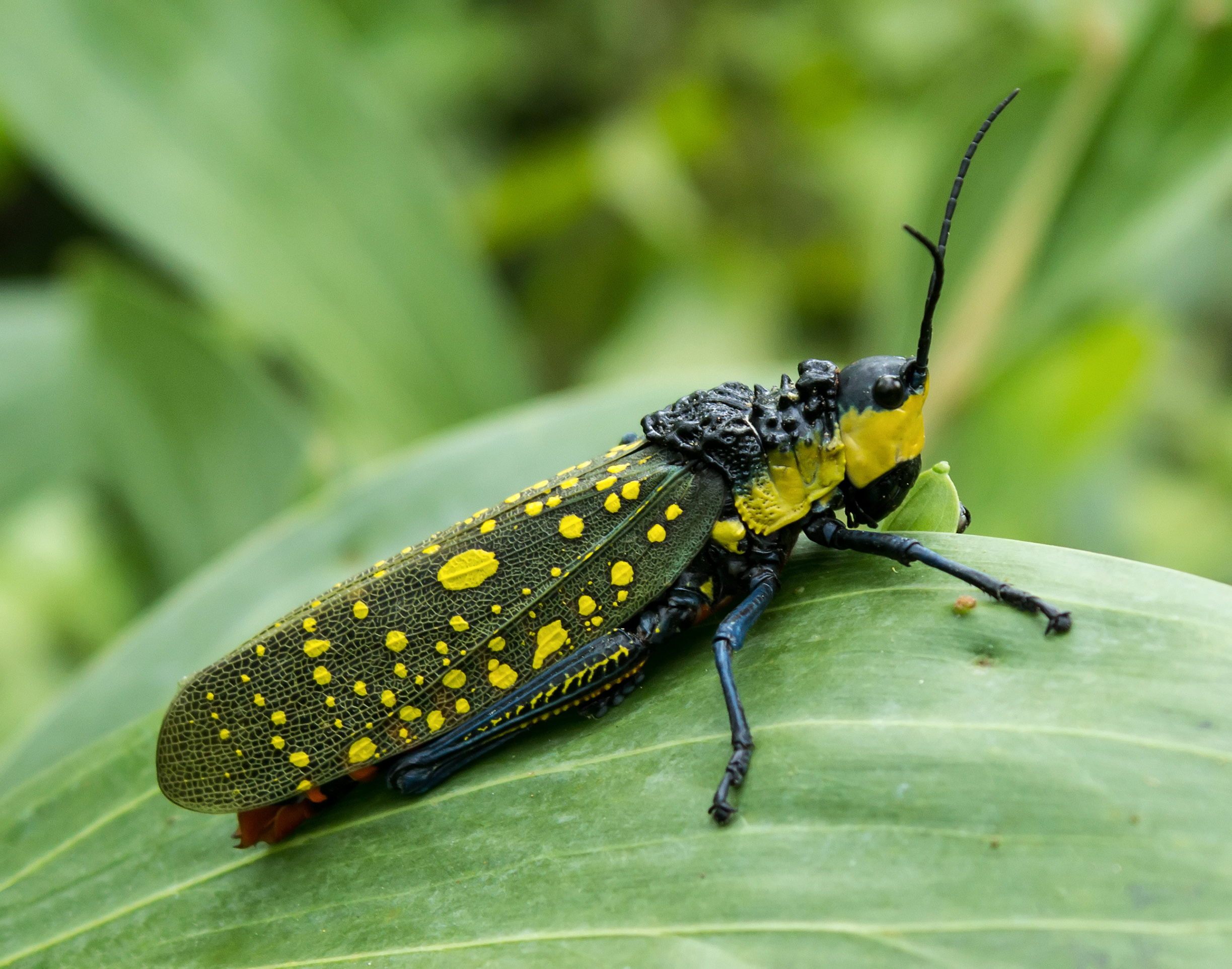
Spotted grasshopper, Aularches miliaris, defends itself with toxic foam and warning colours.

== Relationship with humans ==
=== In art and media ===
Grasshoppers are occasionally depicted in artworks, such as the Dutch Golden Age painter Balthasar van der Ast's still life oil painting, Flowers in a Vase with Shells and Insects, c. 1630, now in the National Gallery, London, though the insect may be a bush-cricket.

Another orthopteran is found in Rachel Ruysch's still life Flowers in a Vase, c. 1685. The seemingly static scene is animated by a "grasshopper on the table that looks about ready to spring", according to the gallery curator Betsy Wieseman, with other invertebrates including a spider, an ant, and two caterpillars.

Grasshoppers are featured in cinema. The 1957 film Beginning of the End portrayed giant grasshoppers attacking Chicago. In the 1998 Disney/Pixar animated film A Bug's Life, the antagonists are a gang of grasshoppers, with their leader Hopper serving as the main villain.

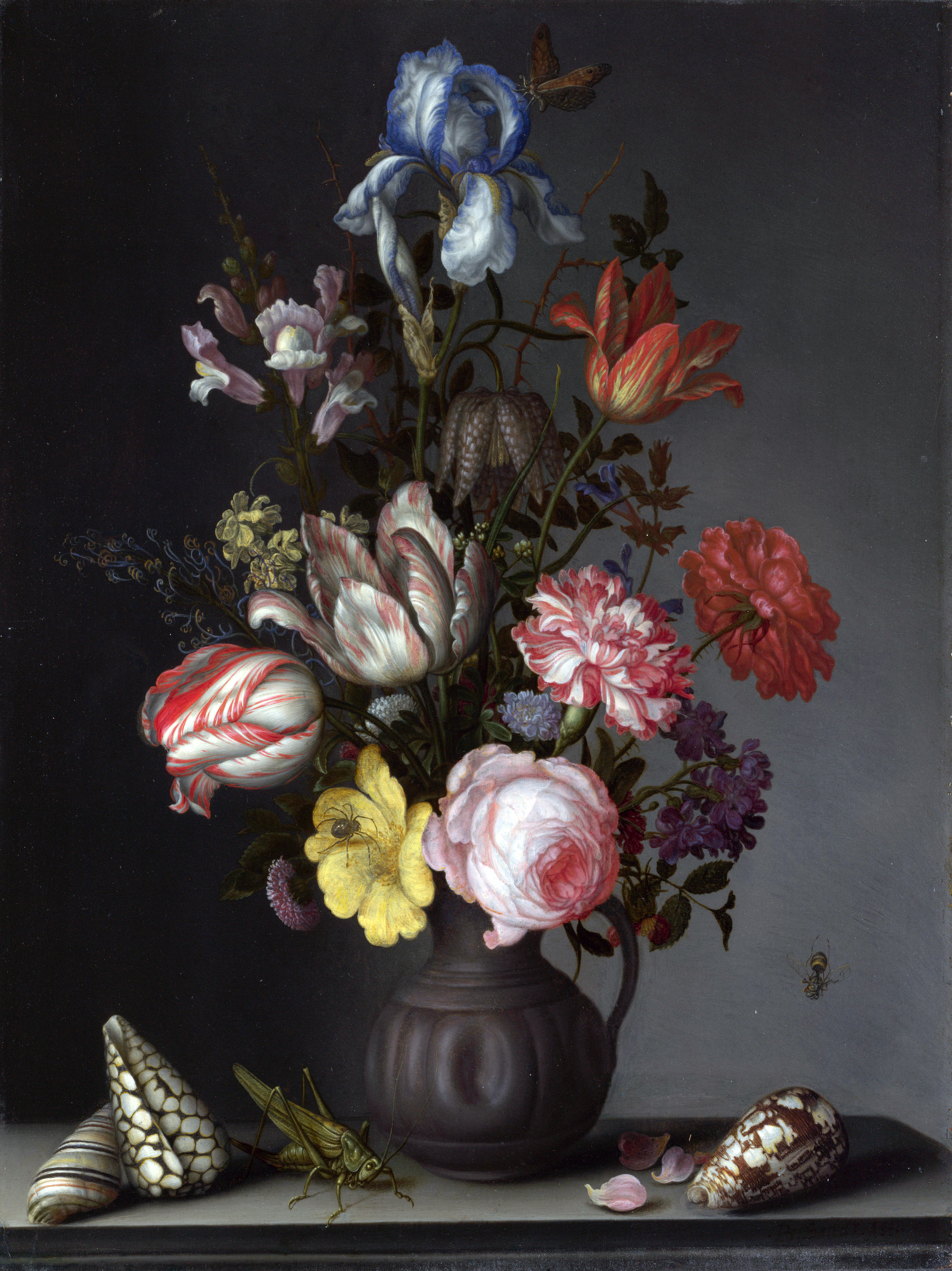
Balthasar van der Ast's oil painting Flowers in a Vase with Shells and Insects, c. 1630

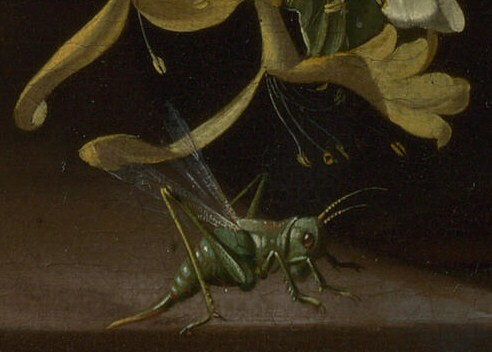
Detail of grasshopper on table in Rachel Ruysch's painting Flowers in a Vase, c. 1685. National Gallery, London

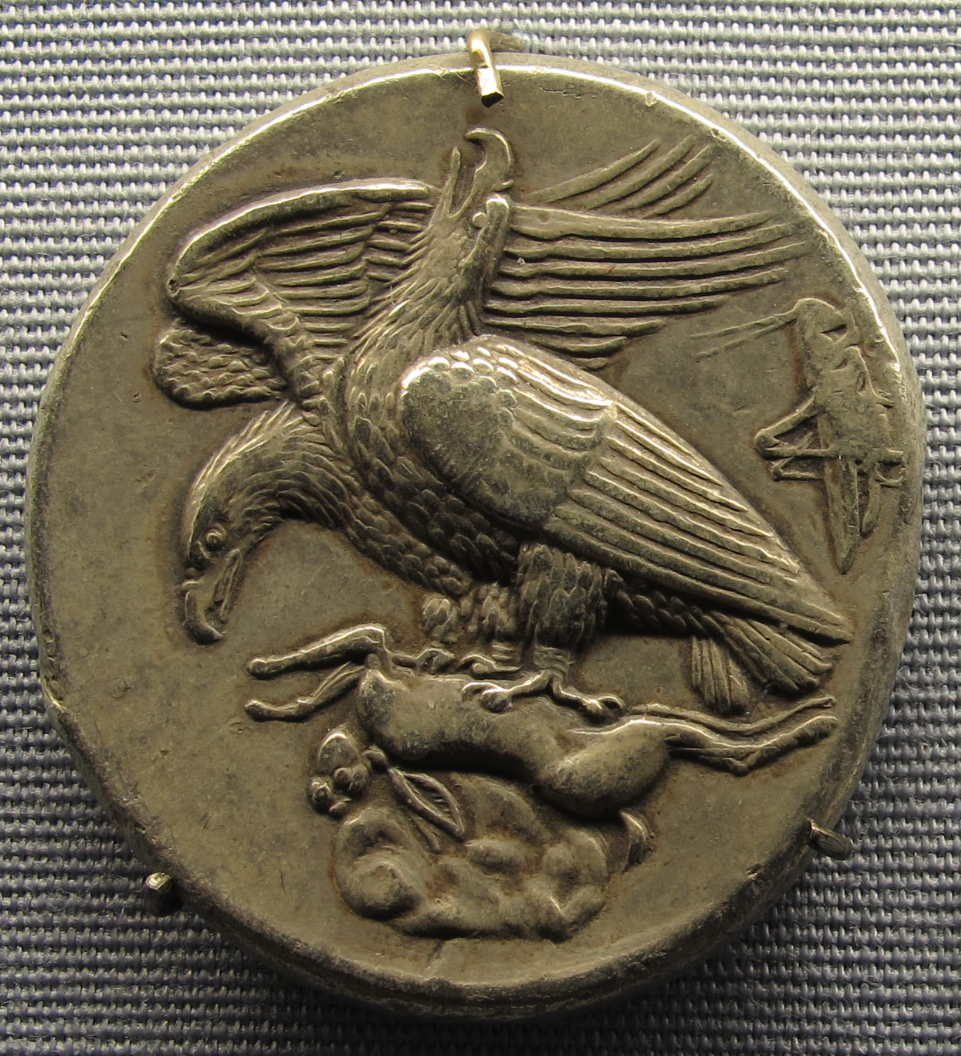
Ancient Greek tetradrachm coin, 410 BC, with grasshopper at right

=== Symbolism ===
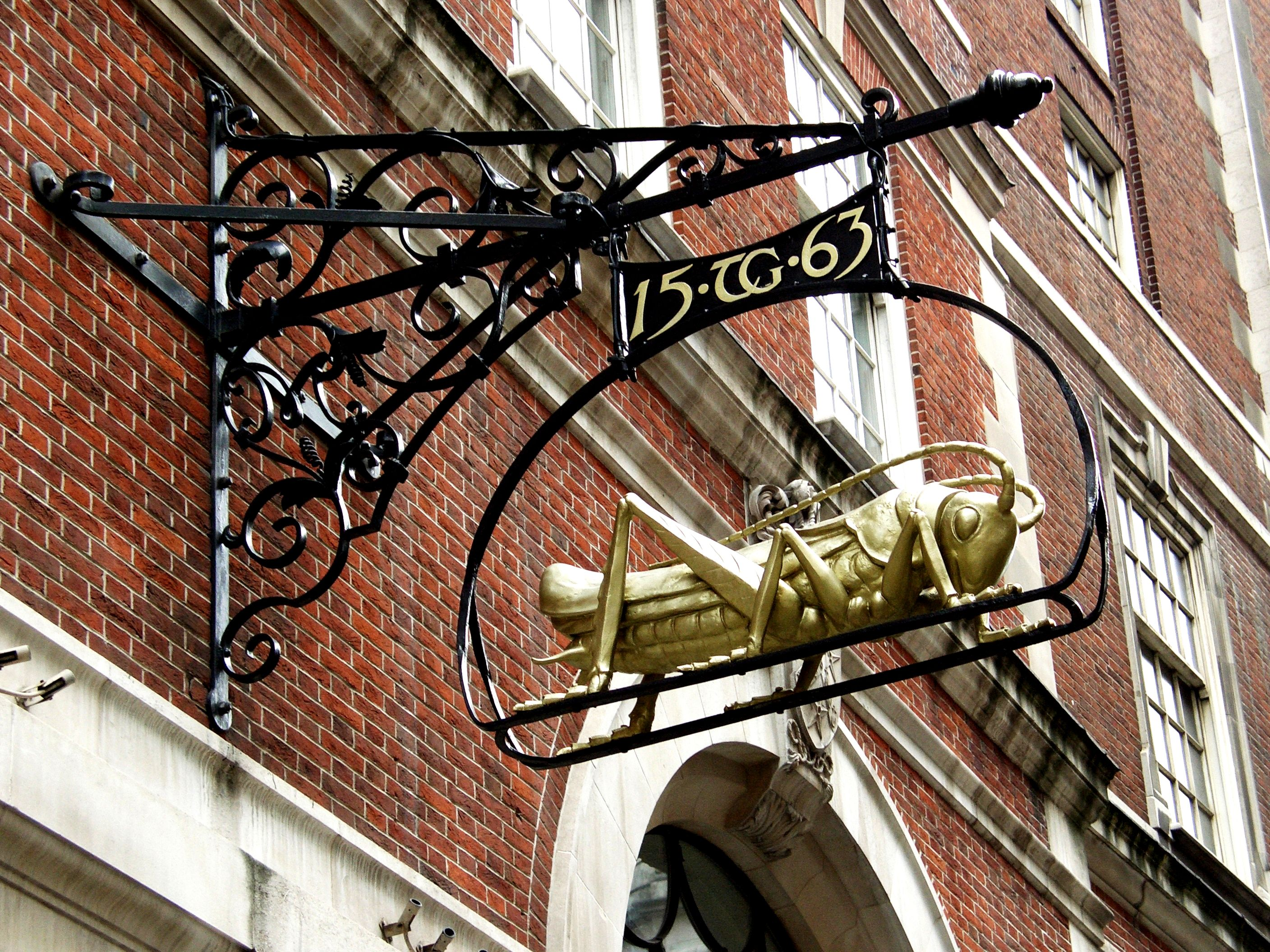
Sir Thomas Gresham's gilded grasshopper symbol, Lombard Street, London, 1563

Grasshoppers are sometimes used as symbols. During the Greek Archaic Era, the grasshopper was the symbol of the polis of Athens, possibly because they were among the most common insects on the dry plains of Attica. Native Athenians for a while wore golden grasshopper brooches to symbolise that they were of pure Athenian lineage with no foreign ancestors. In addition, Peisistratus hung the figure of a kind of grasshopper before the Acropolis of Athens as apotropaic magic.

Another symbolic use of the grasshopper is Sir Thomas Gresham's gilded grasshopper in Lombard Street, London, dating from 1563; (Note: The symbol is a wordplay on the name Gresham and "grass".) the building was for a while the headquarters of the Guardian Royal Exchange, but the company declined to use the symbol for fear of confusion with the locust.

Grasshoppers appearing in dreams have been interpreted as symbols of "Freedom, independence, spiritual enlightenment, inability to settle down or commit to decision". Locusts are taken literally to mean devastation of crops in the case of farmers; figuratively as "wicked men and women" for non-farmers; and "Extravagance, misfortune, & ephemeral happiness" by "gypsies".

=== As food ===
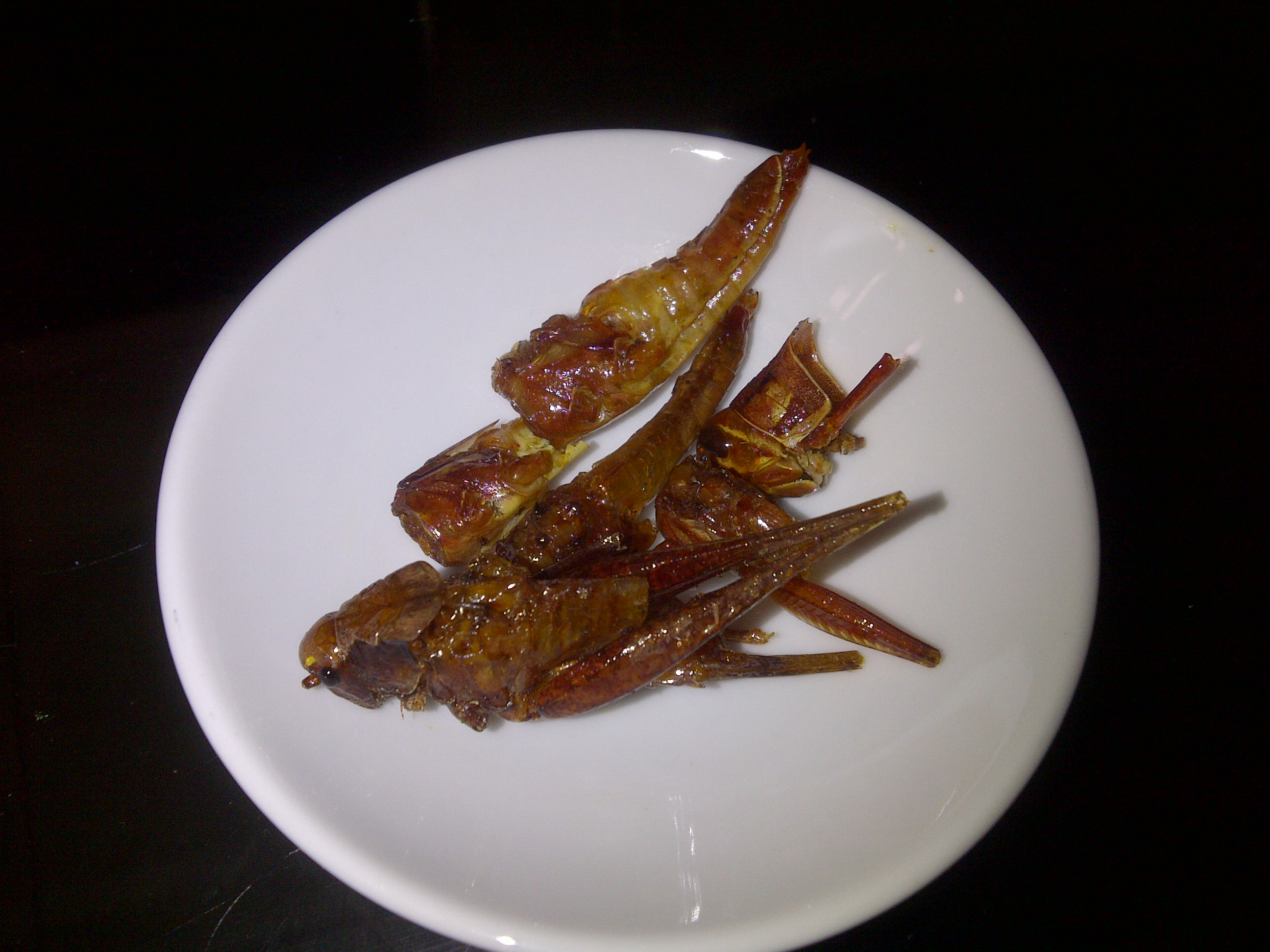
Fried grasshoppers from Gunung Kidul, Indonesia

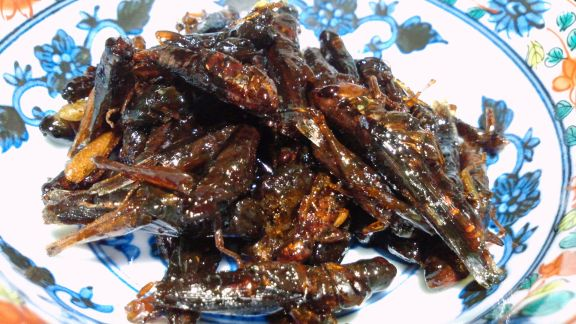
Sweet-and-salty grasshoppers dish in Japan (Inago no Tsukudani)

In some countries, grasshoppers are used as food. In southern Mexico, grasshoppers, known as chapulines, are eaten in dishes such as in tortillas with chilli sauce. Grasshoppers are served on skewers in some Chinese food markets. Fried grasshoppers (walang goreng) are eaten in the Gunung Kidul Regency in Indonesia. Grasshoppers are a delicacy in Uganda; they are eaten fried. In America, the Ohlone burned grassland to herd grasshoppers into pits where they could be collected as food. Among ancient Jews, grasshoppers were considered a popular and even luxurious food, as attested by rabbinic sources. John the Baptist is recorded as having eaten locusts while living in the wilderness. In modern times, grasshoppers continued to be consumed by Bedouins, as well as by Jewish communities in Yemen and North Africa.

=== As pests ===
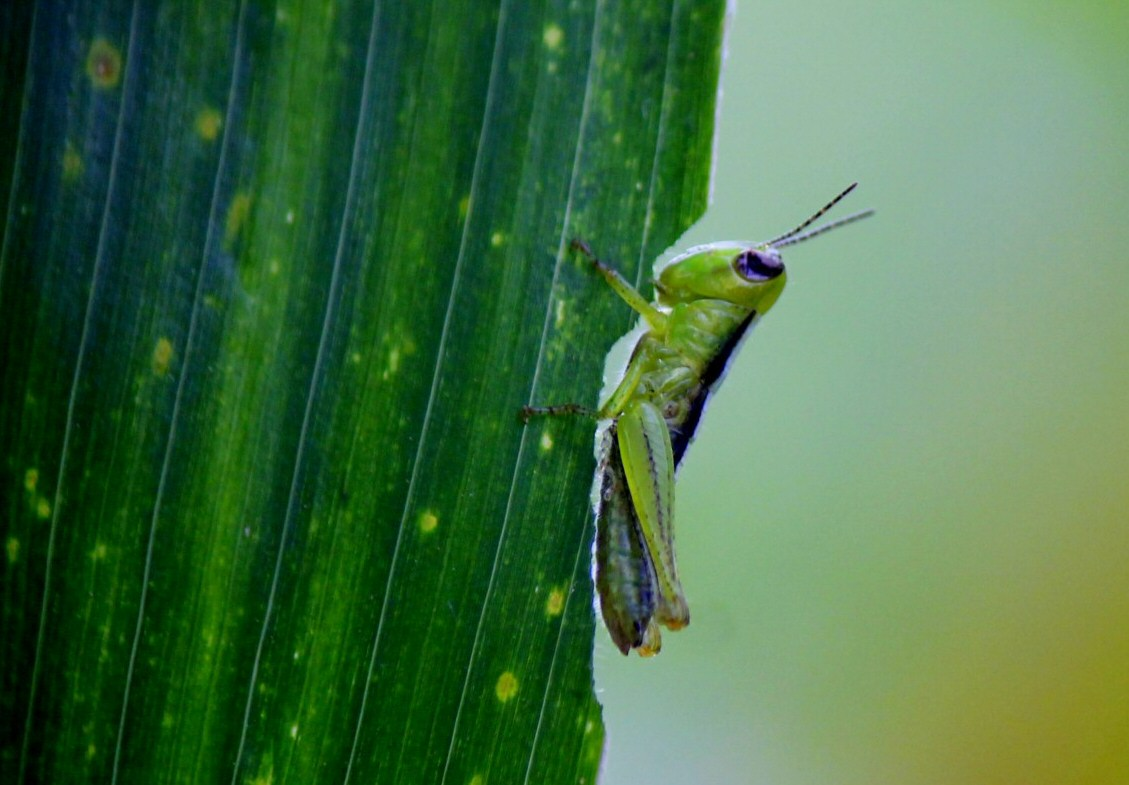
Crop pest: grasshopper eating a maize leaf

Grasshoppers eat large quantities of foliage both as adults and during their development, and can be serious pests of arid land and prairies. Pasture, grain, forage, vegetable and other crops can be affected. Grasshoppers often bask in the sun, and thrive in warm sunny conditions, so drought stimulates an increase in grasshopper populations. A single season of drought is not normally sufficient to stimulate a major population increase, but several successive dry seasons can do so, especially if the intervening winters are mild so that large numbers of nymphs survive. Although sunny weather stimulates growth, there needs to be an adequate food supply for the increasing grasshopper population. This means that although precipitation is needed to stimulate plant growth, prolonged periods of cloudy weather will slow nymphal development.

Grasshoppers can best be prevented from becoming pests by manipulating their environment. Shade provided by trees will discourage them and they may be prevented from moving onto developing crops by removing coarse vegetation from fallow land and field margins and discouraging thick growth beside ditches and on roadside verges. With increasing numbers of grasshoppers, predator numbers may increase, but this seldom happens rapidly enough to have much effect on populations. Biological control is being investigated, and spores of the protozoan parasite Nosema locustae can be used mixed with bait to control grasshoppers, being more effective with immature insects. On a small scale, neem products can be effective as a feeding deterrent and as a disruptor of nymphal development. Insecticides can be used, but adult grasshoppers are difficult to kill, and as they move into fields from surrounding rank growth, crops may soon become reinfested.

Some grasshopper species, like the Chinese rice grasshopper, are a pest in rice paddies. Ploughing exposes the eggs on the surface of the field, to be destroyed by sunshine or eaten by natural enemies. Some eggs may be buried too deeply in the soil for hatching to take place.

Grangers versus Grasshoppers on the Irrepressible Conflict, St. Peter, Minnesota.

Locust plagues can have devastating effects on human populations, causing famines and population upheavals. They are mentioned in both the Qur'an and the Bible and have also been held responsible for cholera epidemics, resulting from the corpses of locusts drowned in the Mediterranean Sea and decomposing on beaches. The FAO and other organisations monitor locust activity around the world. Timely application of pesticides can prevent nomadic bands of hoppers from forming before dense swarms of adults can build up. Besides conventional control using contact insecticides, biological pest control using the entomopathogenic fungus Metarhizium acridum, which specifically infects grasshoppers, has been used with some success.

=== Detection of explosives ===
In February 2020, researchers from Washington University in St. Louis announced they had engineered "cyborg grasshoppers" capable of accurately detecting explosives. Grasshoppers were fitted with lightweight sensor backpacks that recorded and transmitted the electrical activity of their antennal lobes to a computer. The grasshoppers were able to detect the location of the highest concentration of explosives. The researchers also tested the effect of combining sensorial information from several grasshoppers on detection accuracy. The neural activity from seven grasshoppers yielded an average detection accuracy rate of 80%, whereas a single grasshopper yielded a 60% rate.

=== In literature ===
Egyptian hieroglyphs "snḥm"

The Egyptian word for locust or grasshopper was written snḥm in the consonantal hieroglyphic writing system. The pharaoh Ramesses II compared the armies of the Hittites to locusts: "They covered the mountains and valleys and were like locusts in their multitude."

One of Aesop's Fables, later retold by La Fontaine, is the tale of The Ant and the Grasshopper. The ant works hard all summer, while the grasshopper plays. In winter, the ant is ready but the grasshopper starves. Somerset Maugham's short story "The Ant and the Grasshopper" explores the fable's symbolism via complex framing. Other human weaknesses besides improvidence have become identified with the grasshopper's behaviour. So an unfaithful woman (hopping from man to man) is "a grasshopper" in "Poprygunya", an 1892 short story by Anton Chekhov, and in Jerry Paris's 1969 film The Grasshopper.

=== In mechanical engineering ===
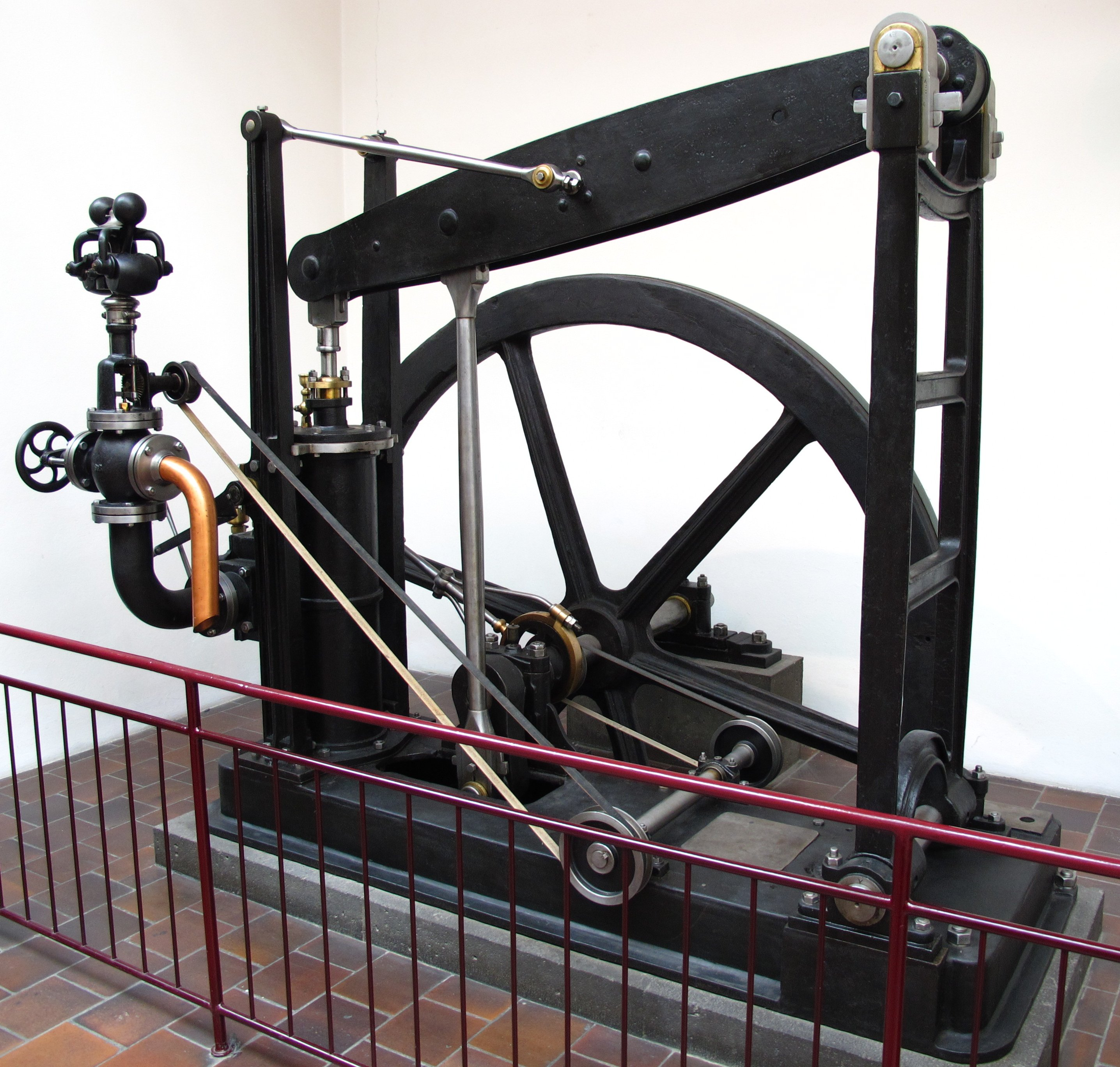
A grasshopper beam engine, 1847

The name "Grasshopper" was given to the Aeronca L-3 and Piper L-4 light aircraft, both used for reconnaissance and other support duties in World War II. The name is said to have originated when Major General Innis P. Swift saw a Piper making a rough landing and remarked that it looked like a grasshopper for its bouncing progress.

Grasshopper beam engines were beam engines pivoted at one end, the long horizontal arm resembling the hind leg of a grasshopper. The type was patented by William Freemantle in 1803.

== Sources ==
- Capinera, John L., ed. (2008). Encyclopedia of Entomology (2nd ed.). Springer. ISBN 978-1-4020-6242-1.
- Chapman, R. F.; Simpson, Stephen J.; Douglas, Angela E. (2013). The Insects: Structure and Function. Cambridge University Press. ISBN 978-0-521-11389-2.
- Cott, Hugh (1940). Adaptive Coloration in Animals. Oxford University Press.
- Pfadt, Robert E. (1994). Field Guide to Common Western Grasshoppers (2nd ed.). Wyoming Agricultural Experiment Station.
