= March Mammal Madness =

Simulated combat between animals

The 2016 logo for Mammal March Madness

March Mammal Madness is an alternate March Madness tournament focusing on simulated combat between organisms of all kinds, despite the name. Katie Hinde created March Mammal Madness, using a 64-animal bracket, with the goal of using biological research to create (simulated) battles.

Katie Hinde, originally an assistant professor in the Department of Human Evolutionary Biology at Harvard University and currently an associate professor in the School of Human Evolution and Social Change at Arizona State University, later brought in three other educators to help her organize the event. This includes assistant professor at Boston University School of Medicine Kristi Lewton, a lecturer at State University of New York Joshua Drew, and assistant professor at Dominican University Christopher Anderson. Along with these educators, a team of artists led by Charon Henning provides artwork of the various mammal competitors throughout the tournament. Together, they research all of the combatants, using what they learned to provide entertainment and information.

In 2017, more educators were added on to the March Mammal Madness team to help. This includes Ph.D. student at the University of Notre Dame Mauna Dasari, postdoctoral fellow at the University of Notre Dame Marc Kissel, post-doctoral researcher and instructor at the University of Utah Patrice Kurnath genetics, genomics, and the phylogeny of the various mammals participating. This includes Anne Stone of the School of Human Evolution and Social Change, and Melissa Wilson Sayres from the School of Life Sciences at Arizona State University.

== Bracket ==
The bracket itself is modeled after the NCAA championship, including an Elite Eight and a Final Four. The bracket is divided into four divisions, which change yearly. The 64 animals are chosen and put into the various divisions based on their characteristics. In the 2015 bracket, the chosen divisions were Mighty Mini Mammals, Mythical Mammals, Critically Endangered Mammals, and Sexy Beasts. Mammals such as the dwarf mongoose and the Java mouse-deer were chosen for the Mighty Mini Mammals, while legendary beasts such as Ratatoskr and the Yeti battled it out in the Mythical Mammals. The mammals compete against others in their division, eventually working their way down to the Final Four (one from each division), and finally the championship.

== Battles ==
The battles are decided by a mix of scientific research and chance. Katie Hinde and the March Mammal Madness organizing team do in-depth research on the contestants. Temperament, diet, social behavior, environment, size, and fight style are just a few of the factors taken into consideration. After these factors are weighed against each other, the team determines probability of one animal defeating another. This is how they develop the seed, or rank, of each animal. Then a 100 sided die is rolled with a determined percentage numbers attributed to each animal. This adds an element of chance, since in sport nothing is guaranteed. Additionally, the environment in which the encounter takes place can be a major factor in the outcome. For the first few rounds, each fight takes place in the environment of the higher seeded animal. After the Sweet Sixteen, it is chosen at random and announced immediately prior to the encounter.

Combining research with an element of chance has led to some major upsets, just like in real life. In round one of the 2015 Mighty Mini Mammal division, the 14th-seeded numbat defeated the 3rd-seed quokka. The research is then used to create a narrative to explain the loss. The narratives can range from a serious battle, to humorous happenstance. In 2014, research showed the pangolin to be the most trafficked animal on the planet. Before the match even began, the pangolin was captured by poachers and shipped away, forfeiting the fight. Each round has a scheduled day and time, found on Arizona State's March Mammal Madness blog.

Instead of just announcing the winners, the written narratives are live-tweeted as if the match was happening in real time. Fans can follow along and tweet back using the designated March Mammal Madness hashtag, creating a fun and exciting atmosphere where people can learn about the animals they support. The creators use a combination of gamification, social media, and narrative in an attempt to make scientific research more accessible. As of 2019, approximately 1100 scholarly works have been represented by March Mammal Madness, which reached about 1% of all high school students in the United States.

In 2017, the wildcard match was performed as a live-action movie to celebrate the fifth anniversary of the tournament. The wildcard match was also done with four mammal competitors instead of the usual two. Members of the March Mammal Madness team dressed up as the competing mammals and acted out the battle in front of a green screen. The battle was then edited together and the final video was tweeted out during the first day of the 2017 March Mammal Madness season.

In 2018, brief summaries of the battles in the style of sports reporting were added, providing for a short recap of each encounter.

== Past battle outcomes ==
All past battle outcomes and play by plays of the battles can be found on the March Mammal Madness Archives.

All tables begin with round two, after the first elimination. The animals' seed number is in parentheses (after round 2 only). If no animals advanced the cell is grey, if the animal was the champion the cell is gold.

=== 2013 ===
Divisions: Carnivores, Primates, Grazers and Browsers, and Hodge Podge

Division	Round 2	Sweet Sixteen	Elite Eight	Final Four	Finals	Champion
Carnivores	Tiger, honey badger, river otter, elephant seal, hyena, lion, leopard seal, polar bear	Honey badger (8), elephant seal (4), lion (3), polar bear (2)	Elephant seal (4), polar bear (2)	Elephant seal (4)		
Primates	Gorilla, Hanuman langur, hamadryas, Anubis baboon, gelada, chimpanzee, uakari, orangutan	Gorilla (1), Anubis baboon (4), chimpanzee (3), orangutan (2)	Gorilla (1), chimpanzee (3)	Gorilla (1)		
Grazers and Browsers	Elephant, oryx, tapir, bison, moose, hippopotamus, elk, rhinoceros	Elephant (1), bison (4), hippopotamus (3), rhinoceros (2)	Elephant (1), hippopotamus (3)	Elephant (1)	Elephant (1)	Elephant
Hodge Podge	Kangaroo, platypus, armadillo, possum, flying fox, warthog, sloth, koala	Armadillo (12), kangaroo (1), warthog (3), sloth (10)	Kangaroo (1), warthog (3)	Warthog (3)	Warthog (3)	

Animals which did not advance to round two: ferret, wolverine, leopard, meerkat, coyote, fennec fox, Tasmanian devil, island fox, dik-dik, camel, wildebeest, gerenuk, reindeer, gazelle, giraffe, duiker, shrew, anteater, wombat, ground squirrel, capybara, sugar glider, red panda, tenrec, naked mole rat, dusky titi monkey, rhesus macaque, lemur catta, bush baby, capuchin, tamarin, red colobus, marmoset

=== 2014 ===
Divisions: Social Mammals, Marine Mammals, Who in the What Now, and Fossil Mammals

Division	Round 2	Sweet Sixteen	Elite Eight	Final Four	Finals	Champion
Social Mammals	Hyena, musk ox, hamadryas, mandrill, Ethiopian wolf, Tibetan macaque, African wild dogs, army ants	Hyena (1), African wild dogs (3), musk ox (2), army ants (12)	Hyena (1), musk ox (2)	Hyena (1)	Hyena (1)	Hyena (1)
Marine Mammals	Orca, sea lion, walrus, humpback whale, bowhead whale, oceanic whitetip shark, dwarf sperm whale, polar bear	Polar bear (2), orca (1), humpback whale (4), oceanic whitetip shark (3)	Orca (1), oceanic whitetip shark (3)	Orca (1)	Orca (1)	
Who in the What Now	Dhole, binturong, cassowary, caracal, saiga, wallaroo, fossa, babirusa	Babirusa (3), wallaroo (10), binturong (5), dhole (1)	Babirusa (3), binturong (5)	Babirusa (3)		
Fossil Mammals	Mastodon, Paraceratherium, woolly rhinoceros, short-faced bear, giant hyena, sabertooth cat, giant ground sloth, Neanderthal	Mastodon, (1) Paraceratherium (2), woolly rhino (3), giant ground sloth (13)	Paraceratherium (2), mastodon (1)	Paraceratherium (2)		

Animals which did not advance to round two: titi monkey, dingo, meerkat, beaver, marmot, bush dog, hyrax, bandicoot, fisher, saki monkey, Sunda colugo, pangolin, echidna, olinguito, mara, A. afarensis, A. sediba, dire wolf, aurochs, giant giraffid, megalania, rhino wombat, giant baboon, Godzilla platypus, sea otter, beluga whale, harbor seal, river dolphin, hooded seal, ringed seal, narwhal, manatee

=== 2015 ===
Divisions: Mighty Minis, Critically Endangered, Mythical Mammals, and Sexy Beasts

Division	Round 2	Sweet Sixteen	Elite Eight	Final Four	Finals	Champion
Mighty Minis	Fennec fox, desert rain frog, pygmy rabbit, tenrec, pygmy marmoset, numbat, Java mouse-deer, dwarf mongoose	Fennec fox (1), tenrec (13), numbat (14), dwarf mongoose (2)	Tenrec (13), dwarf mongoose (2)	Dwarf mongoose (2)	Dwarf mongoose (2)	
Critically Endangered	Sumatran rhino, tenkile, Visayan warty pig, crested black macaque, Iberian lynx, Mediterranean monk seal, northern muriqui, tamaraw	Sumatran rhino (1), crested black macaque (4), Mediterranean monk seal (3), tamaraw (2)	Sumatran rhino (1), tamaraw (2)	Sumatran rhino (1)	Sumatran rhino (1)	Sumatran rhino (1)
Mythical Mammals	Cath Palug, Unicorn, Rougarou, Yeti, Leucrocotta, Ratatoskr, Hanuman, Minotaur	Cath Palug (1), Yeti (now a Were-Yeti after a Rougarou bite) (4), Leucrocotta (6), Minotaur (2)	Were-Yeti (4), Minotaur (2)	Were-Yeti (4)		
Sexy Beasts	Amphicyonidae, lion, Daeodon, brown bear, wolverine, Gigantopithecus, kangaroo, elephant seal	Amphicyonidae (1), brown bear (4), Gigantopithecus (3), elephant seal (2)	Brown bear (4), elephant seal (2)	Brown bear (4)		

Animals which did not advance to round two: jerboa, bumblebee bat, tent-making bat, pygmy mouse lemur, least weasel, pygmy possum, quokka, social tuco-tuco, dormouse, Kanko, Pegasus, Pooka, Ichneumon, Water Horse, Greek Sphinx, Kishi, Colo Colo, yellow-bellied marmot, bighorn sheep, olive baboon, vervet monkey, bongo, koala, Irish elk, European hare, silver pika, black dorcopsis, cloud rat, Siau Island tarsier, Javan slow loris, riverine rabbit, saola, Sibree's dwarf lemur

=== 2016 ===
Divisions: Cold-Adapted Mammals, Mighty Giants, Mammal Mascots, and Mammals of the Nouns. For the mascot mammal bracket, the university and the mammal the mascot represents are linked separately.

Division	Round 2	Sweet Sixteen	Elite Eight	Final Four	Finals	Champion
Cold-Adapted Mammals	Polar bear, hoary marmot, Arctic fox, takin, Pallas' cat, wolverine, Andean mountain cat, snow leopard	Polar bear (1), takin (4), wolverine (3), snow leopard (2)	Polar bear (1), wolverine (3)	Wolverine (3)		
Mighty Giants	Giant panda, Indian giant squirrel, giant anteater, giant river otter, greater mouse deer, large tree shrew, giant flying fox, giant forest hog	Giant panda (1), giant anteater (5), greater mouse deer (6), giant forest hog (2)	Giant panda (1), giant forest hog (2)	Giant forest hog (2)	Giant forest hog (2)	
Mammal Mascots	Howard bison, Quinnipiac bobcat, West Point mules, UW badger, UA Russian boar, UT Longhorn, CSU bighorn sheep, Coast Guard Academy bear	Howard bison (1), West Point mules (5), UT Longhorn (3), Coast Guard Academy bear (2)	Howard bison (1), UT Longhorn (3)	Howard bison (1)		
Mammals of the Nouns	Goat of the mountain, hyrax of the rock, wallaby of the swamp, otter of the sea, dog of the bush, porcupine of the cape, polecat of the steppe, wolf of the tundra	Goat of the mountain (1), otter of the sea (4), porcupine of the cape (3), wolf of the tundra (2)	Goat of the mountain (1), wolf of the tundra (2)	Wolf of the tundra (2)	Wolf of the tundra (2)	Wolf of the tundra (2)

Mammals who did not advance to round two: lemming, snow monkey, caribou, snowshoe hare, Antarctic fur seal, stoat, vicuña, Siberian chipmunk, Haverford black squirrel, Schoolcraft College ocelots, Santa Clara bronco, Penn State mountain lions, Lethbridge pronghorn, Naval Academy goat, Texas A&M javelina, Yale bulldog, Thor's hero shrew, giant cloud rat, giant elephant shrew, giant otter shrew, greater dwarf lemur, giant armadillo, giant flying squirrel, giant mole rat, shrew of the water, viscacha of the mountain, rabbit of the volcano, pocket gopher of the mountain, dog of the prairie, baby of the bush, cat of the sand, vole of the bank

=== 2017 ===
Divisions: Adjective Mammals, Coulda Shoulda, Desert Adapted, and Two Animals One Mammal

Division	Round 2	Sweet Sixteen	Elite Eight	Final Four	Finals	Champion
Adjective Mammals	Spectacled bear, spotted skunk, white-headed capuchin, screaming hairy armadillo, pouched rat, maned wolf, linsang, clouded leopard	Spectacled bear (1), white-headed capuchin (5), maned wolf (3), clouded leopard (2)	Spectacled bear (1), clouded leopard (2)	Spectacled bear (1)		
Coulda Shoulda	Sabertooth cat, Greek sphinx, Neanderthal hunting party, giraffe, tiger, leopard seal, Pegasus, short-faced bear	Greek sphinx (8), Neanderthal hunting party (5), leopard seal (3), short-faced bear (2)	Neanderthal hunting party (5), short-faced bear (2)	Short-faced bear (2)	Short-faced bear (2)	Short-faced bear (2)
Desert Adapted	Honey badger, Gila monster, ringtail, aardwolf, Tibetan sand fox, saiga, South American gray fox, guanaco	Honey badger (1), aardwolf (4), saiga (3), guanaco (2)	Honey badger (1), guanaco (2)	Honey badger (1)	Honey badger (1)	
Two Animals One Mammal	Bear cat, tiger quoll, antelope squirrel, spider monkey, bear cuscus, hog badger, hog deer, leopard cat	Bear cat (1), spider monkey (4), hog badger (3), hog deer (7)	Spider monkey (4), hog deer (7)	Spider monkey (4)		

Animals which did not advance to round two: snow leopard, fisher, rhesus macaque, sac-winged bat, long-tailed pangolin, burrowing bettong, hairy-nosed wombat, bat-eared fox, red squirrel, brown-throated sloth, silky anteater, southern marsupial mole, meerkat, patas monkey, marbled polecat, bilby, long-eared hedgehog, sand cat, jerboa, giant red flying squirrel, lion, leopard, fossil baboon, dire wolf, giant armadillo, Irish elk, quokka, shrew mole, raccoon dog, otter civet, kangaroo rat, mouse opossum, deer mouse, squirrel monkey, grasshopper mouse

=== 2018 ===
Divisions: Antecessors, Great Adaptations, When the Kat's Away, and Urban Jungle

Division	Round 2	Sweet Sixteen	Elite Eight	Final Four	Finals	Champion
Antecessors	Doedicurus, Thalassocnus, Thylacoleo, Andrewsarchus, Pseudaelurus, Dimetrodon, Homo floresiensis, Amebelodon	Doedicurus (1), Andrewsarchus (4), Dimetrodon (3), Amebelodon (2)	Doedicurus (1), Amebelodon (2)	Amebelodon (2)	Amebelodon (2)	
Great Adaptations	Pygmy hippo, maned rat, water deer, Tasmanian devil, jaguarundi, crabeater seal, aye-aye, cheetah	Pygmy hippopotamus (1), Tasmanian devil (4), crabeater seal (3), cheetah (2)	Pygmy hippopotamus (1), cheetah (2)	Pygmy hippopotamus (1)	Pygmy hippopotamus (1)	pygmy hippopotamus (1)
When the Kat's Away	Orinoco crocodile, Goliath tarantula, secretary bird, mantis shrimp, Eurasian eagle owl, Komodo dragon, common octopus, green anaconda	Orinoco crocodile (1), secretary bird (5), Komodo dragon (3), green anaconda (2)	Orinoco crocodile (1), green anaconda (2)	Orinoco crocodile (1)		
Urban Jungle	Harar hyena, Bristol fox, sewer rat, coyote, bobcat, Berlin boar, porcupine, Cape Town baboon	Harar hyena (1), coyote (4), Berlin boar (3), porcupine (7)	coyote (4), porcupine (7)	coyote (4)		

Animals which did not advance to round two: Jugulator, Thalassocnus, Procoptodon, Nuralagus rex, Archaeoindris, Aegyptopithecus, Palaeoloxodon, Deinogalerix, star-nosed mole, platypus, solenodon, ghost bat, desman, edible dormouse, coatimundi, fat-tailed dunnart, goldcrest, praying mantis, Bothrops asper, horseshoe crab, alligator snapping turtle, beaded lizard, giant salamander, cookiecutter shark, tardigrade, Belo Horizonte marmoset, raccoon, Moscow dog, opossum, striped skunk, eastern gray squirrel, Delhi rhesus, hedgehog

=== Alt Advance ===
In 2018, the tardigrade advanced several rounds without winning. In the When the Kat's Away division, the anaconda didn't see it, but was the official winner. The tardigrade continued to ride each winning animal, thus becoming an "alt-champion".

=== 2019 ===
Divisions: Jump Jump, Waterfalls, Tag Team, and CAT-e-Gory

Division	Round 2	Sweet Sixteen	Elite Trait	Final Roar	Finals	Champion
Jump Jump	Bengal tiger, tenrec, rock-wallaby, armadillo, impala, bharal, springhare, spinner dolphin	Bengal tiger (1), spinner dolphin (3), bharal (4), armadillo (10)	Bengal tiger (1), spinner dolphin (3)	Bengal tiger (1)	Bengal tiger (1)	Bengal tiger (1)
Waterfalls	Beaver, moose, flat-headed cat, manatee, rakali, lowland tapir, aquatic genet, moonrat	Manatee (2), moose (1), rakali (13), tapir (3)	Manatee (2), moose (1)	Moose (1)		
Tag Team	Zebra & oxpecker, aardvark & aardvark cucumber, crab & sea turtle, wrasse & moray eel, Diana monkey & red colobus, banded mongoose & warthog, wattled jacana & capybara, coyote & badger	Zebra & oxpecker (1), crab & sea turtle (5), mongoose & warthog (3), coyote & badger (2)	Zebra & oxpecker (1), mongoose & warthog (3)	Mongoose & warthog (3)	Warthog & mongoose (3)	
CAT-e-Gory	Sea lion, tiger quoll, lion-tailed macaque, bearcat, small spotted cat shark, fisher cat, tiger owl, nimravid	Sea lion (1), tiger owl (5), bearcat (3), tiger quoll (7)	Sea lion (1), tiger quoll (7)	Sea lion (1)		

Animals which did not advance to round two: tiger beetle, ringtail cat, jackrabbit, serval, stoat, klipspringer, spinifex hopping mouse, sifaka, markhor, bulldog bat, water chevrotain, mink, white-lipped peccary, crab-eating fox, water opossum, marine otter, vontsira, batfly & gammaproteobacteria, Goeldi's monkey & saddleback tamarin & white-lipped tamarin, clownfish & sea anemone, fire coral & algae, Bornean bat & pitcher plant, burying beetles & phoretic mites, fork-tailed drongo & sociable weaver, ants & aphids, antlion, stonecat, panther chameleon, tiger salamander, cat snake, leopard frog, green catbird, dandelion

=== 2020 ===
Divisions: Tiny Terrors, Double Trouble, Cat-ish vs. Dog-ish, and AnthropoSCENE

Division	Round 2	Sweet Sixteen	Elite Trait	Final Roar	Finals	Champion
Tiny Terrors	Finlayson's squirrel, southern African hedgehog, island fox, kodkod, tree hyrax, raccoon dog, pudu, pygmy hog	Pygmy hog (1), pudu (2), raccoon dog (3), tree hyrax (4)	Pygmy hog (1), raccoon dog (3)	Raccoon dog (3)		
Double Trouble	Wolverine, sarus crane, red-footed booby, seahorse, gorilla, largetooth sawfish, Indian cobra, speartooth shark	Indian cobra (4), speartooth shark (2), largetooth sawfish (3), gorilla (1)	largetooth sawfish (3), gorilla (1)	Gorilla (1)	Gorilla (1)	Gorilla (1)
Cat-ish vs. Dog-ish	Red panda, tayra, fossa, African civet, common kusimanse, European badger, brown hyena, sloth bear	tayra (7), sloth bear (1), African civet (4), brown hyena (3)	Sloth bear (1), brown hyena (3)	Brown hyena (3)	Brown hyena (3)	
AnthropoSCENE	Gopher tortoise, house cat, California condor, Australian feral camel, common cuttlefish, thylacine, trumpeter swan, Florida panther	Common cuttlefish (5), trumpeter swan (4), Australian feral camel (1), gopher tortoise (7)	Trumpeter swan (4), gopher tortoise (7)	Gopher tortoise (7)		

Animals which did not advance to round two: Grandidier's mongoose, spotted linsang, falanouc, greater grison, kinkajou, Caspian seal, giant forest genet, solongoi, pygmy spotted skunk, kowari, collared pika, gray-bellied caenolestid, least chipmunk, bank vole, northern short-tailed shrew, Seba's short-tailed bat, southern ningaui, feral pigeon, chinchilla, little brown bat, face mite, bogue, monarch butterfly, honeybee, chytrid, lynx, zokor, green iguana, harbor porpoise, filarial nematode, acorn barnacle, long-legged bat, amoeba

=== 2021 ===
Divisions: Tricksy Taxonomy, Red in Fur, Of Myth and Monsters, and Sea Beasties

Division	Round 2	Sweet Sixteen	Elite Trait	Final Roar	Finals	Champion
Tricksy Taxonomy	Dugong, musk deer, Egyptian fruit bat, solenodon, jaguarundi, mountain tapir, tarsier, red wolf	Dugong (1), Egyptian fruit bat (12), mountain tapir (3), red wolf (2)	Dugong (1), mountain tapir (3)	Mountain tapir (3)		
Red in Fur	Red kangaroo, red-crested tree rat, red brocket, maroon langur, red fox, bay cat, red ruffed lemur, red hartebeest	Red kangaroo (1), red brocket (5), bay cat (3), red hartebeest (2)	Red kangaroo (1), red hartebeest (2)	Red kangaroo (1)	Red kangaroo (1)	Red kangaroo (1)
Of Myth and Monsters	Harpy eagle, ghost bat, devil frog, Picado's jumping pitviper, sphinx monkey, chimpanzee, blue-capped ifrit, crypt-keeper wasp	Harpy eagle (1), devil frog (5), sphinx monkey (6), blue-capped ifrit (7)	Harpy eagle (1), sphinx monkey (6)	Harpy eagle (1)	Harpy eagle (1)	
Sea Beasties	Saber-toothed anchovy, pink vent fish, vampire squid, black dragonfish, ammonite, platyzilla, yeti crab, midgardia seastar	Saber-toothed anchovy (1), vampire squid (5), ammonite (6), midgardia seastar (2)	Saber-toothed anchovy (1), midgardia seastar (2)	Saber-toothed anchovy (1)		

Animals which did not advance to round two: colo colo opossum, aoudad, Kinda baboon, Malagasy striped civet, Amami rabbit, common treeshrew, mara, red wolf, southern red-backed vole, Hopi chipmunk, red & white giant flying squirrel, Siberian weasel, little red flying fox, ring-tailed vontsira, red-necked pademelon, red squirrel, Goliath beetle, thorny devil, fire salamander, flying dragon lizard, black & red bush squirrel, white-winged vampire bat, Brussels Griffon, Masrasector nananubis, planktonic copepod, lathe acteon (snail), basket star, blue glaucus, demon eartheater cichlid, tube anemone, Aphrodite anthias, Hydra

=== 2022 ===
Divisions: Mammal Collectives, Wild North America, Queens of the Sea and Sky, and Why Not Both?

Division	Round 2	Sweet Sixteen	Elite Trait	Final Roar	Finals	Champion
Mammal Collectives	Pride of lionesses, embarrassment of pandas, cauldron of bats, lodge of beavers, conspiracy of lemurs, wisdom of wombats, sneak of weasels, stench of skunks	Pride of lionesses (1), lodge of beavers (4), wisdom of wombats (11), stench of skunks (10)	Pride of lionesses (1), stench of skunks (10)	Pride of lionesses (1)	Pride of lionesses (1)	Pride of lionesses (1)
Wild North America	Grizzly bear, bison, black bear, jaguar, mountain lion, elk, bighorn sheep, grey wolf	Grizzly bear (1), jaguar (4), elk (6), bighorn sheep (7)	Grizzly bear (1), elk (6)	Grizzly bear (1)		
Queens of the Sea and Sky	Orca, sea snake, common map turtle, blanket octopus, eclectus parrot, Steller's sea eagle, Indian fruit bat, Hawaiian monk seal	Orca (1), common map turtle (5), Steller's sea eagle (3), Hawaiian monk seal (2)	Orca (1), Steller's sea eagle (3)	Orca (1)	Orca (1)	
Why Not Both?	Walrus, echidna, serval, pangolin, therapsid, spotted salamander, hairy frogfish, swordfish	Walrus (1), pangolin (4), therapsid (6), swordfish (2)	Walrus (1), swordfish (2)	Swordfish (2)		

Animals which did not advance to round two: labor of moles, town of prairie dogs, herd of reindeer, prickle of hedgehogs, troop of monkeys, romp of otters, glaring of cats, skulk of foxes, Mexican free-tailed bat, southern bog lemming, 13-lined ground squirrel, marsh rabbit, kit fox, yellow-bellied marmot, coyote, badger, Mexican free-tailed bat, Florida bonneted bat, common prawn, Iberian ribbed newt, northern jacana, macaroni penguin, dobsonfly, Arctic tern, anglerfish, hagfish, lichen, leaf slug, lungfish, painted redstart, New Zealand lesser short-tailed bat, scansoriopterygid, hairy frog, muntjac

=== 2023 ===
Divisions: Mighty Stripes, Itty Bitty Comeback City, Animal Engineers, and Dad Bods

Division	Round 2	Sweet Sixteen	Elite Trait	Final Roar	Finals	Champion
Mighty Stripes	Okapi, kudu, striped hyena, striped dolphin, side-striped jackal, striped rabbit, striped polecat, highland streaked tenrec	Okapi (1), kudu (2), striped hyena (3), striped dolphin (4)	Okapi (1), kudu (2)	Okapi (1)	Okapi (1)	
Itty Bitty Comeback City	Sea otter, rock hyrax, dik dik, mara, Sibree dwarf lemur, itjaritjari, bulldog bat, grasshopper mouse	Rock hyrax (2), dik dik (3), mara (4), grasshopper mouse (9)	Rock hyrax (2), mara (4)	Rock hyrax (2)		
Animal Engineers	Golden eagle, cathedral termite, Homo habilis, lungfish, Palaeocastor, goanna, puffer fish, New Caledonian crow	Golden eagle (1), cathedral termite (2), Homo habilis (3), Palaeocastor (5)	Golden eagle (1), Homo habilis (3)	Golden eagle (1)		
Dad Bods	Emperor penguin, greater rhea, wolverine, siamang, Pacific spiny lumpsucker, bat-eared fox, owl monkey, dayak fruit bat	Emperor penguin (1), greater rhea (2), wolverine (3), Pacific spiny lumpsucker (5)	Emperor penguin (1), wolverine (3)	Wolverine (3)	Wolverine (3)	Wolverine (3)

Animals which did not advance to round two: four-striped grass mouse, striped polecat, striped possum, chequered elephant shrew, wildcat, fire-footed rope squirrel, numbat, badger bat, shrew mole, bumblebee bat, southern ningaui, silver pika, Siberian chipmunk, silky anteater, colo colo opossum, Thor's hero shrew, pygmy jerboa, spongilla fly, veined octopus, trapdoor spider, tent-making bat, rufous hornero, bee, Montezuma oropendola, dung beetle, lined seahorse, Caspian tern, peacock wrasse, Darwin's frog, spotted sandpiper, giant water bug, greater flamingo, three-spined stickleback

=== 2024 ===
Divisions: Epic Animals, Rainbow Collection, Connoisseur Critters, and Take a Bow

Division	Round 2	Sweet Sixteen	Elite Trait	Final Roar	Finals	Champion
Epic Animals	Sperm whale, giant squid, tiger, wolf, stag, boar, Lucy, raven	Sperm whale (1), giant squid (2), tiger (3), stag (5)	Sperm whale (1), giant squid (2)	Giant squid (2)	Giant squid (2)	
Rainbow Collection	Painted wild dog, red-shanked douc, Wolf's mona monkey, marbled polecat, Halloween crab, peacock mantis shrimp, Nicobar pigeon, mottled cup moth	Painted wild dog (1), marbled polecat (4), peacock mantis shrimp (6), mottled cup moth (10)	Painted wild dog (1), peacock mantis shrimp (6)	Painted wild dog (1)		
Connoisseur Critters	Kob, great skua, porcupine, tufted ground squirrel, pitcher plant, chestnut-headed bee-eater, batfly, cobra lily	Kob (1), great skua (2), porcupine (3), cobra lily (13)	Kob (1), great skua (2)	Great skua (2)		
Take a Bow	Northern elephant seal, great white shark, leatherback sea turtle, pronghorn, opossum, flame bowerbird, swamp nightjar, honey bee	Northern elephant seal (1), great white shark (3), leatherback sea turtle (4), honey bee (15)	Northern elephant seal (1), great white shark (3)	Great white shark (3)	Great white shark (3)	Great white shark (3)

Animals which did not advance to round two: albatross, bigeye houndshark, Indian grey mongoose, starling, mouse, catfish, Tarzan chameleon, schizomid, golden-headed lion tamarin, Himalayan monal, mandarin fish, Bornean rainbow toad, Madagascan sunset moth, flat lizard, rainbow scarab, sparklemuffin peacock spider, rainbow grasshopper, koala, fork-marked lemur, hairy-legged bee, northern short-tailed shrew, Wichita Mountains pillsnail, velvet worm, parasitic guest ant, bear's head, forest elephant, howler monkey, coral snake, hognose snake, wrinkle-faced bat, singing mouse, elegant dancing frog, Asian cornborer moth

=== 2025 ===
Division	Round 2	Sweet 16	Elite Trait	Final Roar	Finals	Champion
Same & Different	Thorold's deer, gelada, paca, coati, aardvark, sun bear, flying snake, Sunda colugo	Gelada (8), coati (4), sun bear (2), colugo (3)	Gelada (8), sun bear (2)	Gelada (8)		
The Only Ones	Addax, spotted-necked otter, maned wolf, peccary, quokka, puma/cougar, indri, saiga	Addax (1), peccary (4), puma (2), saiga (3)	Addax (1), puma (2)	Puma (2)	Puma (2)	
Tuxedo Style	Polar bear, Tasmanian devil, tapir, Cape buffalo, ribbon seal, narwhal, zebra, wild yak	Polar bear (1), Cape buffalo (4), narwhal (2), zebra (6)	Polar bear (1), narwhal (2)	Polar bear (1)	Polar bear (1)	Polar bear (1)
Roots & Relicts	Ginkgo & rhizo*, forest tortoise, ringed seal, coelacanth, horseshoe crab, gar, tuatara, frilled shark	Ginkgo & rhizo* (1), ringed seal (4), gar (2), frilled shark (3)	Ginkgo & rhizo*, gar (2)	Ginkgo & rhizo* (1)		

Animals which did not advance to round two: Olympic marmot, grey kangaroo, mouse deer, fig-eating bat, bandicoot, hedgehog, greater glider, northern flying squirrel, Grant's golden mole, tayra, muskrat, mountain beaver, marsh mongoose, star-nosed mole, hispid hare, woolly giant rat, Eurasian water shrew, Delacour's langur, giant cloud rat, moonrat, tamandua, eastern spotted skunk, white-faced capuchin, zorilla, mycorrhizal fungus*, platypus, olm, mudskipper, pelican, cyanobacteria, starry sturgeon, fern

*#1 seed ginkgo and #16 rhizo merged to become "ginkgo & rhizo" who made the Final Roar

=== 2026 ===
Division	Round 2	Sweet 16	Elite Trait	Final Roar	Finals	Champion
Library Legends	Nile croc, mouse, grey fox, Eurasian eagle owl, cat, dog, white stork, lions	Nile croc (1), grey fox (5), cat (6), lions (2)	Nile croc (1), lions (2)	Nile croc (1)	Nile croc (1)	
That's So Metal	Honey badger, least shrew, chuckwalla, Pacific lamprey, grasshopper mouse, Gila monster, shrike, ossifrage	Honey badger (1), Pacific lamprey (4), Gila monster (3), ossifrage (2)	Honey badger (1), Gila monster (3)	Honey badger (1)		
Money Mammals	Humpback whale, eastern gorilla, giraffe, Indian rhino, Bornean orangutan, hippo, Arabian oryx, Asian elephant	Humpback whale (1), Indian rhino (4), hippo (3), Asian elephant (2)	Humpback whale (1), hippo (3)	Humpback whale (1)	Humpback whale (1)	Humpback whale (1)
Extinction is Forever	Steller's sea cow, Saudi gazelle, baiji, yallara, thylacine, aurochs, sea mink, dromedary camel	Steller's sea cow (1), baiji (5), aurochs (3), dromedary camel (2)	Steller's sea cow (1), aurochs (3)	Aurochs (3)		
