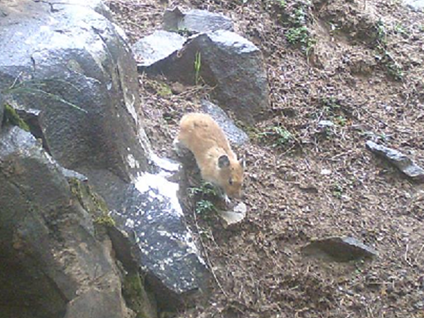
- Summer coat, Helan Mountains, Ningxia, China

Conservation status
- Endangered (IUCN 3.1)

Scientific classification
- Kingdom: Animalia
- Phylum: Chordata
- Class: Mammalia
- Order: Lagomorpha
- Family: Ochotonidae
- Genus: Ochotona
- Species: O. argentata

Binomial name
- Ochotona argentata Howell, 1928
- Helan Shan pika range
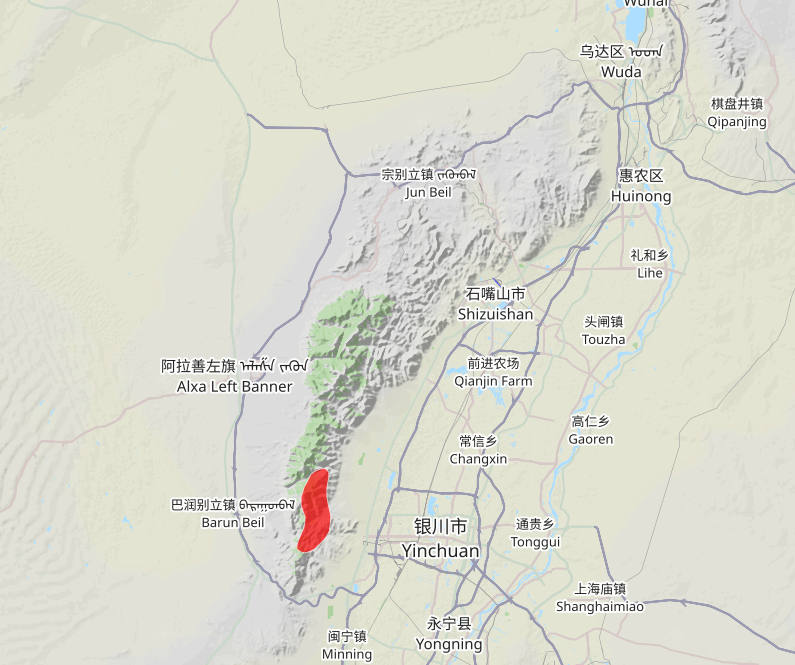
- Zoomed-in range map showing relief of the Helan Mountains

Synonyms
- Ochotona alpina argentata Howell, 1928; Ochotona helanshanensis Zheng Tao in Wang Xiangtin, 1990

= Helan Shan pika =

Species of mammal

The Helan Shan pika (Chinese: 贺兰山鼠兔; pinyin: Hèlánshān shǔtù) or silver pika (Ochotona argentata) is a rock-dwelling species of pika that is endemic to a small region of the Helan Mountains in Inner Mongolia and Ningxia, China. As a pika, it is a small mammal that resembles and is closely related to rodents. It is a large species relative to other pikas, and has an orange-red fur coat that changes to silver in winter. This pika typically lives in forested areas among rocks and in tunnels and rock slides formed by human mining activities.

The Helan Shan pika is an herbivore and builds haypiles out of vegetation for food storage, like most other pikas. It makes little noise compared to other pikas, outside of the breeding season, and is potentially active at night. It is closely related to Pallas's pika, and is listed as an endangered species by the International Union for Conservation of Nature due to deforestation across its limited distribution.

== Evolution ==
=== Taxonomy and etymology ===
The Helan Shan pika was first described as a subspecies of the alpine pika (Ochotona alpina) in 1928 by American zoologist Alfred Brazier Howell. He described it as the subspecies Ochotona alpina argentata based on a female specimen collected in 1923 by explorer Janet Elliott Wulsin's husband Frederick, and noted its "striking" silvery winter coat. The pika was thought to be related to another alpine pika subspecies, O. a. nitida, which is now synonymous with the nominate subspecies, O. a. alpina. Its type locality was "15 miles north-northwest of Ninghsia [Yinchuan], northern Kansu, China".

There was a period of confusion following the 1990 description of Ochotona helanshanensis, a species discovered in the same narrow distribution as O. argentata, whether it was distinct from Pallas's pika (Ochotona pallasi) and O. argentata. O. helanshanensis was described as a subspecies of Pallas's pika (O. p. helanshanensis) based on genetic evidence in studies from 2000 and 2001. This changed in 2006, when it was made synonymous with O. argentata. O. argentata was still considered a subspecies of the alpine pika up until 1997, when it was given species status.

Common names for the species include "silver pika", based on its winter coat, and "Ningxia pika", (Note: Chinese: 宁夏鼠兔; pinyin: Níngxià shǔtù) based on its habitat.

=== Phylogeny ===
There are no subspecies of the Helan Shan pika. It is closely related to Pallas's pika (Ochotona pallasi) based on molecular analyses; the original assumption that it was related to the alpine pika has been disproven by differences in the two species' behavior, chromosome number, size, and genetics. The Helan Shan pika has a diploid chromosome number of 38.

== Description ==
The Helan Shan pika is a small, furred lagomorph. Its ears are widely spaced and the feet are covered with white, slightly buff fur. The pika's body fur changes colour with the season, being orange-red across the head and back and light gray underneath in summer, and silver across the entire upper body and back and white to buff on the underside in winter. The winter coat has notably fine black tips on the silver hairs of the pika's back. An indistinct white stripe borders the pika's ears, which maintain a gray colouration throughout the year and do not become red in summer. The Helan Shan pika has an adult head and body length of 208 to 235 millimetres (8.2 to 9.3 in), ear diameter of 22 to 25 mm (0.87 to 0.98 in), hind foot length of 31 to 35 mm (1.2 to 1.4 in) and weight of 176 to 236 grams (6.2 to 8.3 oz).

This pika has a slightly convex skull, with long nasal cavities. The auditory bullae (bone structures that form the inner ears) are large and spaced far apart from each other. The space between the eyes is formed by a broad, flat bone structure. There are several pear-shaped foramina (openings) in the back of the palate. The length of these foramina, as well as the large size of the pika's orbits (eye sockets), allows for differentiation of Helan Shan pika specimens from those of the alpine pika, which has shorter palatal foramina and smaller orbits.

== Distribution and habitat ==
The Helan Shan pika is endemic to and only occurs in the Helan Mountains in the Inner Mongolia and Ningxia regions of China which lie between the semi-arid Ordos Desert and the Yellow River Valley to the east and the Badain Jaran Desert to the west. The pika occupies a region covering 107 km^{2} (41 sq mi) of the mountain range. It occurs at elevations up to 3,000 m (9,800 ft).

The Helan Shan pika is a rock-dwelling species, and occupies rocky outcrops in both open and forested areas. It has been found up to 20 metres (66 ft) deep in the entrances of disused mines, and has been known to take shelter in the cairns known as ovoo built as part of Mongolian shamanism.

== Behavior and ecology ==
The Helan Shan pika lives among stones and piled rocks from mines. It is a generalized herbivore and feeds on grass and other green vegetation. For food storage, it makes haypiles of dried grass and sedges and stores them in cool areas such as mines. While it is most often seen during the day, some Helan Shan pikas have been observed as active during the night, when it is generally cooler, which may be an adaptation to climate change. This same behavior has been seen in American pikas (O. princeps) that reside in warming areas at low elevations.

Pikas are well known for their vocalizations, but the Helan Shan pika is less vocal than the alpine pikas and Pallas's pikas found nearby. It is somewhat more vocal during the breeding season in the spring and at midday in the winter. The breeding season lasts from early April to August, and females produce a single litter of two to four young within a year. Their gestation period is roughly 25 days.

== Conservation status ==
The Helan Shan pika is known only from a high altitude site in a single mountain range in China. This habitat was presumed to be only 3 km^{2} (1.2 sq mi) on the first surveys of the species, leading the International Union for Conservation of Nature (IUCN) to evaluate it as a critically endangered species in 1996. Surveys by an ornithologist working in the region that happened to note the pika increased its potential range to 107 km^{2} (41 sq mi), which caused it to no longer meet the criteria for critically endangered species. Its population size is unknown, but is likely to be decreasing as a result of logging activities within its range resulting in loss of habitat. Individuals are noted as being especially sensitive to changes in temperature, which affects their ability to disperse from shelter to safer potential habitats and may be a detriment to the species as climate change affects the region.

Observations of the Helan Shan pika were only recorded five times from the period between 2017 and 2023. As of 2016, the species is listed by the IUCN as endangered, and it is considered as critically endangered by the authors of the Red List of China's Vertebrates. Recommendations have been made to conserve the Helan Shan pika's remaining habitat and research the species further to uncover its sparsely-known biology, ecology, habitat, and population sizes, as it is one of the least-studied species of pika in China, where many species in the pika genus are endemic. Most of the studies that describe the Helan Shan pika focus on its systematics and genetic relationships with other pikas.

== See also ==
- List of endangered and protected species of China
