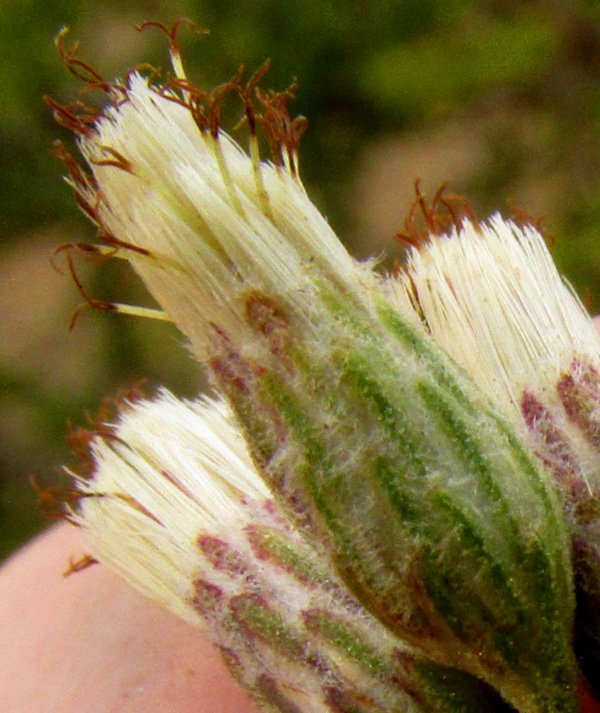
- Brickellia pedunculosa flowering head

Scientific classification
- Kingdom: Plantae
- Clade: Tracheophytes
- Clade: Angiosperms
- Clade: Eudicots
- Clade: Asterids
- Order: Asterales
- Family: Asteraceae
- Genus: Baccharis
- Species: B. sordescens

Binomial name
- Baccharis sordescens DC.

Synonyms
- Neomolina sordescens (DC.) F.H. Hellw.

= Baccharis sordescens =

Species of plant

Baccharis sordescens, with no commonly used English name, is a species of shrub native only to Mexico. It belongs to the family Asteraceae.

== Discription ==
Here are distinctive field marks of Baccharis sordescens:

- Shrubs stand up to 1.1 m (3 ft 7 in) tall, with densely hairy stems.
- Hairy leaves with petioles up to 6 mm (1/4 in) long have blades up to 3.9 cm (1 1/2 in) long and 1.8 cm (3/4 in) wide. The margin is distinctly toothed with about 5 teeth per 1 cm (3/8 in).
- Plants are dioecious, bearing either male or female flowers, but not both; male heads produce no fruits. Heads of the sexes are similar in general appearance, though corollas of male florets are 4.5–5.5 mm (3/16–7/32 in) long while those of the female are 2.5–4 mm (1/8–3/16 in), and female corollas are more slender than those of the males. Woolly-hairy, purple-tinged, green, scale-like involucral bracts enclosing and mostly concealing the florets' lower parts are arranged in 4 series.
- One-seeded, cypsela-type fruits are up to 2 mm (1/16 in) long, somewhat hairy, and each is topped with up to 74 bristles as long as 6.5 mm (1/4 in).

== Distribution ==
Baccharis sordescens is endemic just to Mexico, from the northern states of Nuevo León, Tamaulipas and Coahuila south to the states of Jalisco, México, Hildago and Veracruz.

== Habitat ==
In the Valley of Mexico, at elevations between 2,250–2,800 m (7,380–9,190 ft), Baccharis sordescens occurs in dry scrub as well as thickets of Bursera and Schinus as in grassy areas with Maguey (Agave) and eucalyptus. Images on this page show an individual in central Mexico surviving in a heavily overgrazed abandoned field, protected inside a spiny Vachellia farnesiana at an elevation of 1,880 m (6,170 ft).

== Ecology ==
It is known that in general the presence of Baccharis species protects soil from degradation, and that they are useful for restoring productivity to degraded land.

An example of Baccharis sordescens interacting with other organisms in its environment is that in central Mexico it is the main plant host of the brightly colored Rainbow Grasshopper, Dactylotum bicolor. A study found that when the plant was ingested by the grasshopper at least three chemical compounds likely provided potential toxic effects which protected the grasshopper from predation. The grasshopper's bright colors are an instance of "warning coloration," or aposematism, warning of the toxicity.

== Taxonomy ==
In 1836 when Augustin Pyramus de Candolle formally described and named Baccharis sordescens, he remarked that he had seen a dried specimen in the herbarium of Hænke, "sent by the renowned de Sternberg."

From historical context, Hænke was undoubtedly the pioneer Czech botanist Thaddäus Haenke, whose notes on South America were studied by Alexander von Humboldt who later collected many plants while in Mexico during his American Expedition of 1799-1804. De Sternberg almost certainly was Kaspar Maria von Sternberg, whose collection of fossil plants Humboldt considered to be the best and largest of the world. Humboldt collected plants in central Mexico in 1803. De Candolle collaborated with Humboldt, who is known to have shared specimens collected from his expedition with other scientists. A good bet is that de Candolle's type specimen was a Humboldt collection.

=== Etymology ===
The genus name Baccharis is making an obscure allusion to the Roman god Bacchus, perhaps used originally for a different plant.

The species name sordescens is from Latin meaning "somewhat dirty" or "becoming dirty." Possibly this refers to the off-white, pale tan color of the pappi, as seen in images on this page.

== Gallery ==
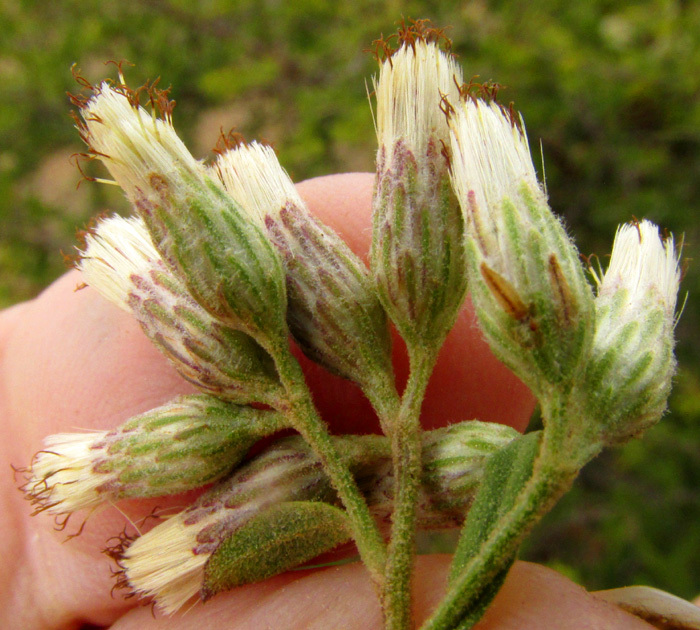
Cluster of flora heads

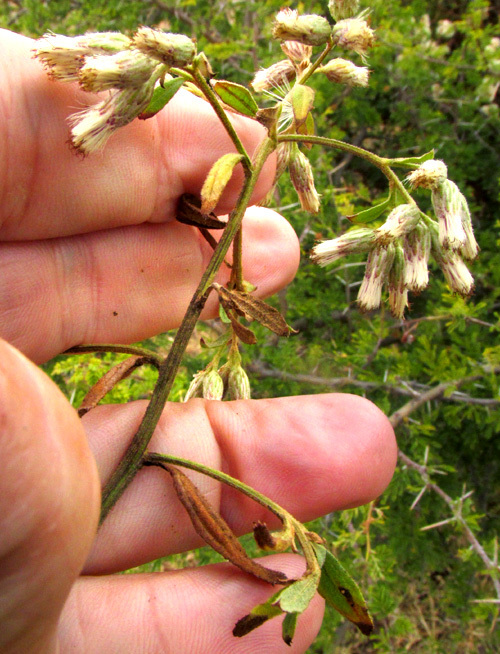
Inflorescence

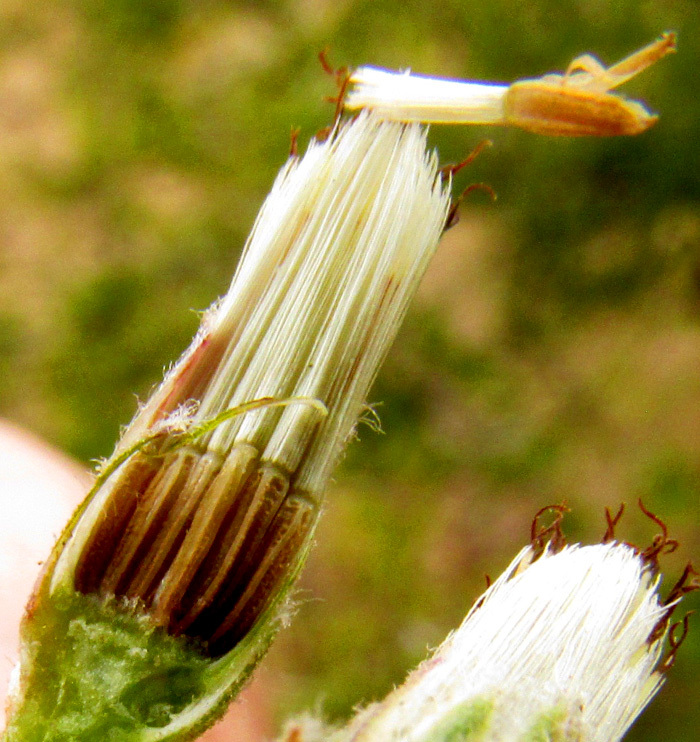
Cypselae developing in dissected head

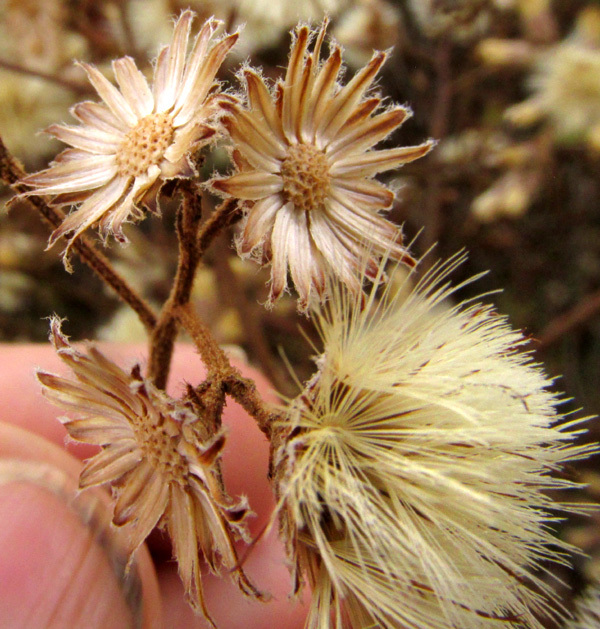
Conspicuous involucral bracts after seed dispersal

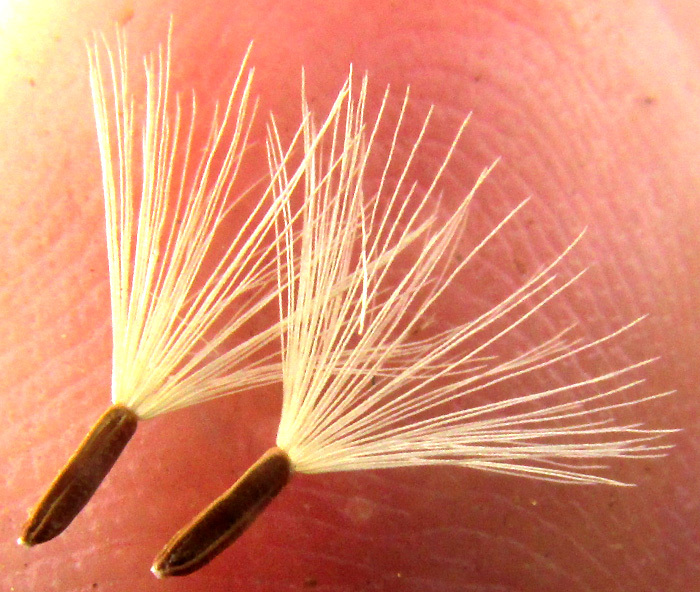
Cypselae with off-white pappi

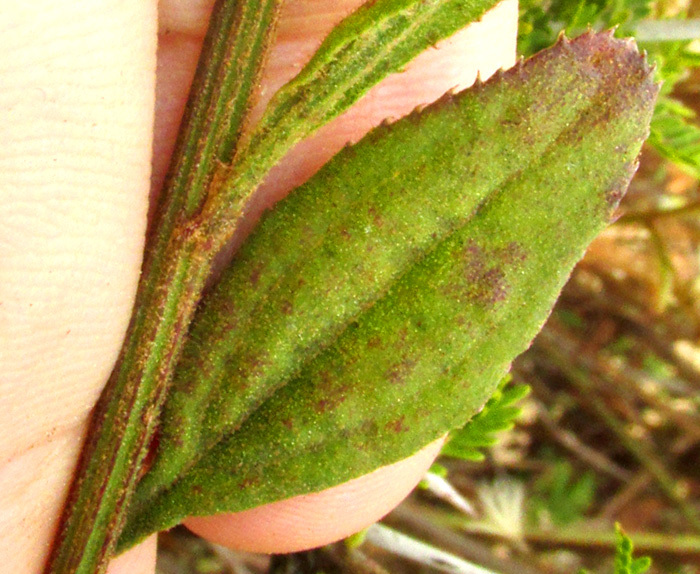
Leaf upper surface

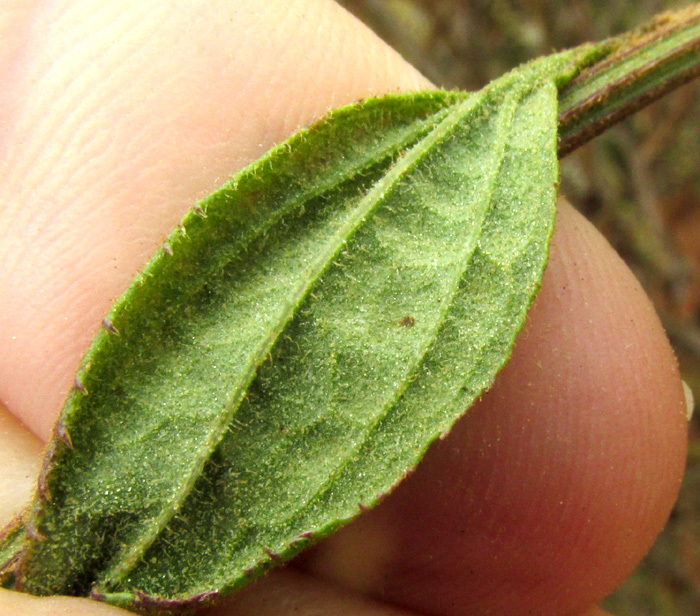
Leaf lower surface showing down-curved margins

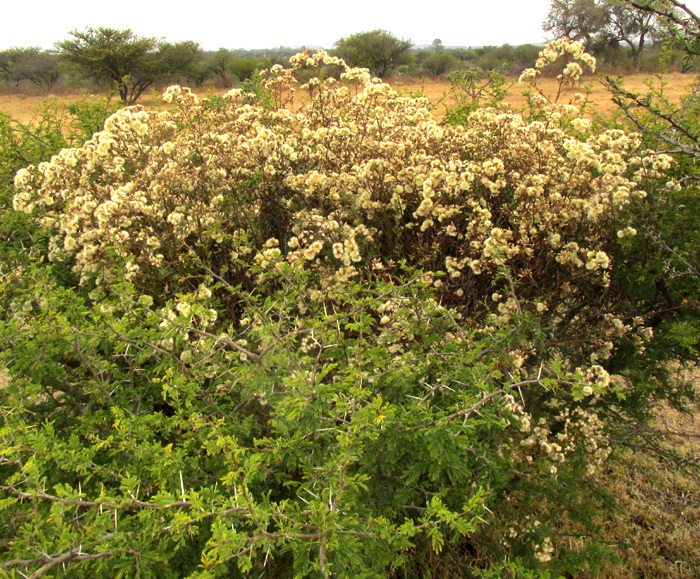
Plant protected inside spiny Vachellia farnesiana
