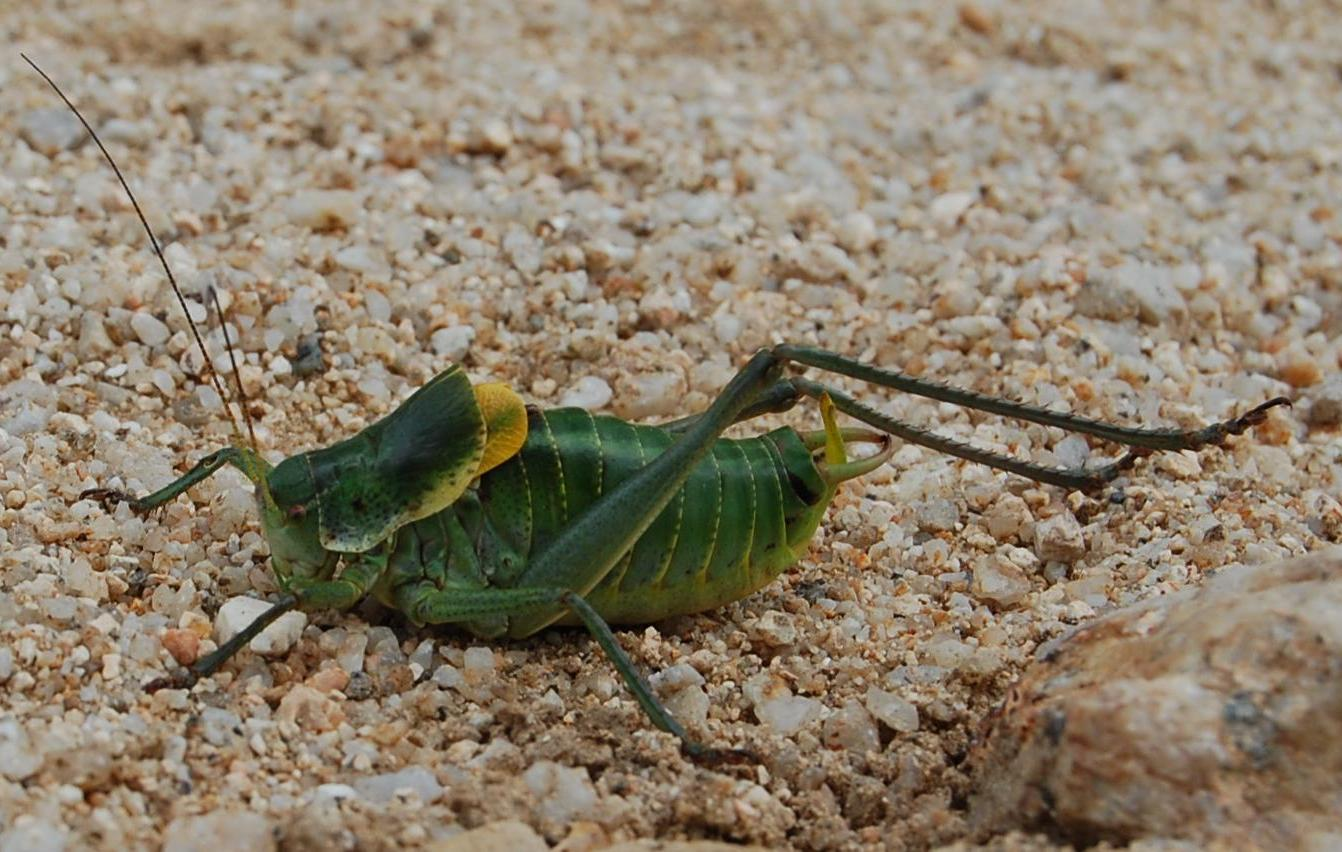
- Polysarcus denticauda male

Scientific classification
- Kingdom: Animalia
- Phylum: Arthropoda
- Clade: Pancrustacea
- Class: Insecta
- Order: Orthoptera
- Suborder: Ensifera
- Family: Tettigoniidae
- Subfamily: Phaneropterinae
- Genus: Polysarcus
- Species: P. denticauda

Binomial name
- Polysarcus denticauda (Charpentier, 1825)

Audio
- Song

= Polysarcus denticauda =

Species of cricket-like animal

Polysarcus denticauda is a species of insect belonging to the family Tettigoniidae subfamily Phaneropterinae. It is found in Spain, France, Germany, Hungary, Austria, Czech Republic, Slovak Republic, Albania, Croatia, Bosnia and Herzegovina, Greece, European Turkey, Switzerland and Bulgaria. The habitat is long grass meadows with lush vegetation. Such meadows should be mowed late and fertilized only slightly.

Close-up of a Polysarcus denticauda
