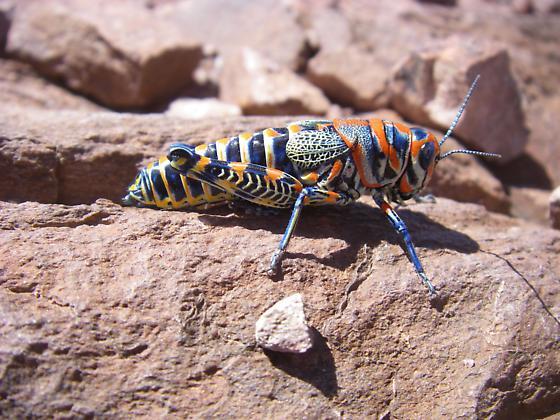
- Dactylotum bicolor

Scientific classification
- Kingdom: Animalia
- Phylum: Arthropoda
- Class: Insecta
- Order: Orthoptera
- Suborder: Caelifera
- Family: Acrididae
- Tribe: Dactylotini
- Genus: Dactylotum; Charpentier, 1845

Synonyms
- Poepedetes Saussure, 1861

= Dactylotum =

Genus of grasshoppers

Dactylotum is genus of grasshoppers in the family Acrididae. They occur in North America.

== Species ==
There are two species:

- Dactylotum bicolor Charpentier, 1845
- Dactylotum corallinum (Saussure, 1861)
