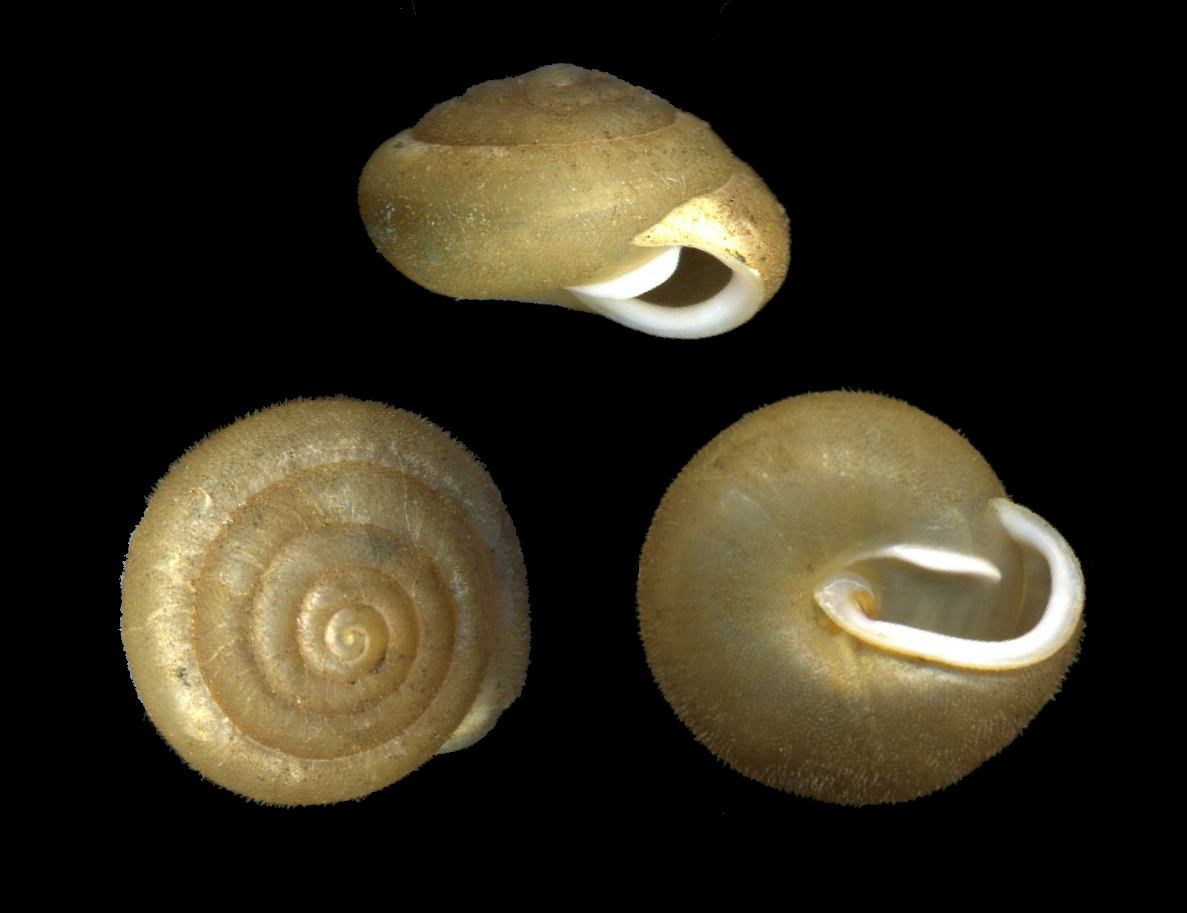
- Three views of a shell of Euchemotrema fraternum

Conservation status
- Secure (NatureServe)

Scientific classification
- Kingdom: Animalia
- Phylum: Mollusca
- Class: Gastropoda
- Order: Stylommatophora
- Family: Polygyridae
- Genus: Euchemotrema
- Species: E. fraternum

Binomial name
- Euchemotrema fraternum (Say, 1824)

= Euchemotrema fraternum =

Species of gastropod

Euchemotrema fraternum is a species of air-breathing land snail, a terrestrial pulmonate gastropod mollusc in the family Polygyridae.

== Subspecies ==
- Euchemotrema fraternum montanum (Archer, 1939)
