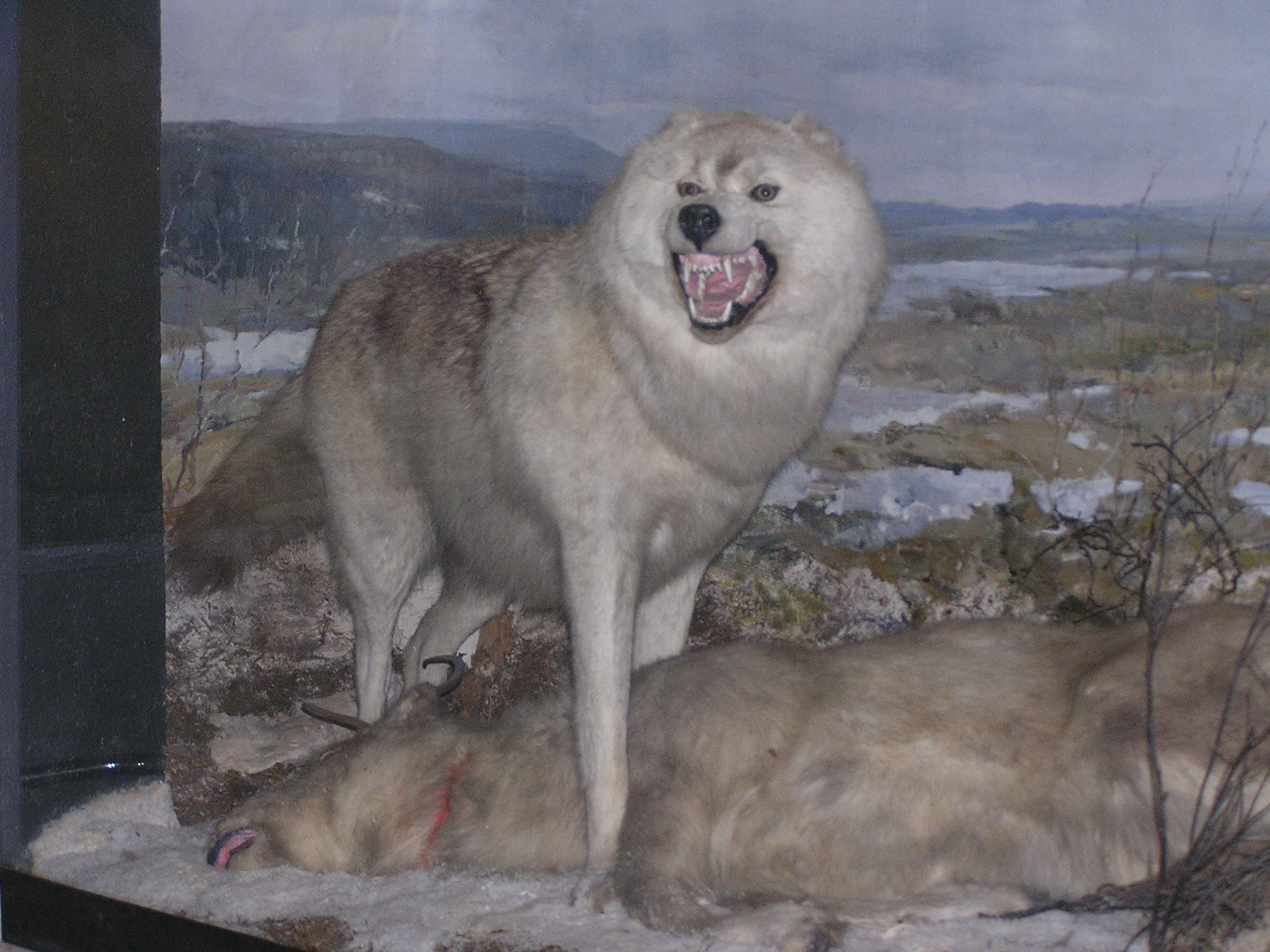
- Taxidermy exhibit at the Museum of Zoology, St. Petersburg

Scientific classification
- Kingdom: Animalia
- Phylum: Chordata
- Class: Mammalia
- Order: Carnivora
- Family: Canidae
- Genus: Canis
- Species: C. lupus
- Subspecies: C. l. albus

Trinomial name
- Canis lupus albus Kerr, 1792
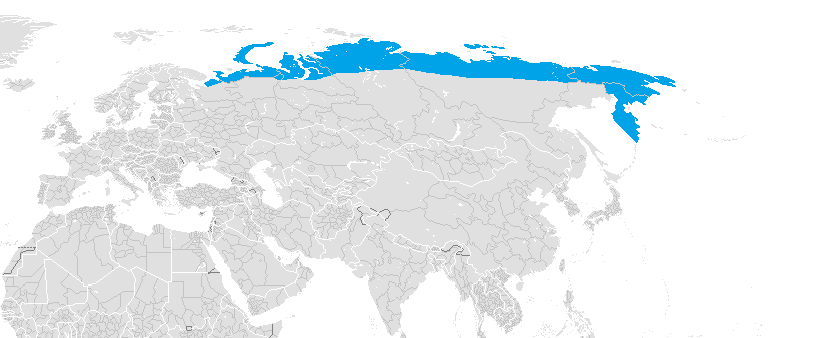
- Tundra wolf range

Synonyms
- C. l. dybowskii (Domaniewski, 1926); C. l. kamtschaticus (Dybowski, 1922); C. l. turuchanensis (Ognev, 1923)

= Tundra wolf =

Subspecies of carnivore

The tundra wolf (Canis lupus albus), also known as the Turukhan wolf, is a subspecies of grey wolf native to northern Eurasia.

== Taxonomy ==
It was first classified in 1792 by Robert Kerr based on a description by Gerhard Friedrich Müller, describing it as a "white wolf" with a highly valued pelt living around the Yenisei. Reginald Innes Pocock provisionally supported the continued distinction of the tundra wolf in 1935 after examining a single mounted skin from Minusinsk held in the British Museum. In 1951, Ellerman and Morrison-Scott would synonymise two putative subspecies from the Kamchatka Peninsula, C. l. kamtschaticus and C. l. dybowskii, and another from the Turukhansky District, C. l. turuchanensis, to C. l. albus.

Ronald Nowak recognised the tundra wolf as a distinct subspecies in 1995 on the basis of morphometric measurements of skulls from northwestern Siberia, noting that it showed greater affinity to North American Arctic wolves than to other Eurasian wolf subspecies. It is recognised as distinct by Mammal Species of the World, but not by the American Society of Mammalogists. A 2022 review of available data on the taxonomy of Asiatic wolf populations found that recognition of this subspecies' distinctiveness hinges entirely on morphometric skull measurements, with no further supporting evidence for its validity.

== Description ==
It is a large subspecies, with adult males measuring 118–137 cm (46.5–54 in) in body length, and females 112–136 cm (44–53.5 in). Average weight is 40–49 kg (88–108 lb) for males and 36.6–41 kg (81–90 lb) for females. The highest weight recorded among 500 wolves caught in the Taymyr Peninsula and the Kanin Peninsula during 1951-1961 was from an old male killed on the Taymyr at the north of the Dudypta River weighing 52 kg (115 lb). Vladimir Geptner described the subspecies as smaller than C. l. lupus, while Sokolov and Rossolimo described it as larger on average, being surpassed in size only by the North American C. l. occidentalis.

The fur is very long, dense, fluffy, and soft, and is usually light grey in colour. The lower fur is lead-grey and the upper fur is reddish-grey. Black guard hairs form a fairly broad stripe along the ridge of the back. It is paler than C. l. lupus, but slightly darker than C. l. arctos.

== Range and ecology ==
The tundra wolf occurs throughout the tundra and forest-tundra regions of Eurasia. Both L. David Mech and Vladimir Geptner placed the tundra wolf's easternmost occurrence in the Kamchatka Peninsula, though Mech placed its westernmost occurrence at Finland, while Geptner placed it at "perhaps in the extreme north of the Scandinavian Peninsula". The IUCN's Wolf Specialist Group, however, placed the tundra wolf's range as "northern Russia", not listing it among the subspecies present in Scandinavian countries. Sokolov and Rossolimo noted that the southern boundary of the tundra wolf's range is difficult to determine, as it overlaps extensively with the northern range of C. l. lupus.

The tundra wolf generally rests in river valleys, thickets and forest clearings. In winter it feeds almost exclusively on female or young wild and domestic reindeer: 93.1% of the stomach contents of 74 wolves caught in the Nenets Autonomous Okrug in the 1950s during the winter and spring months were found to consist of reindeer remains. Nevertheless, hares, arctic foxes and other animals are sometimes targeted. In the summer, tundra wolves feed extensively on birds and small rodents, as well as newborn reindeer calves.

== History ==
During the first working meeting of the IUCN's wolf specialists' group in 1973, Dmitriy Bibikov noted that, although there was no risk of extinction for any of the wolf subspecies in the Soviet Union, tundra wolves were the closest to being endangered, as their numbers had been "heavily reduced" through aerial hunting. Pressure from this method of hunting drove some tundra wolves southwards into taiga areas, where they interbred with C. l. lupus. They were eliminated in some Arctic islands, including Wrangel Island. Tundra wolf populations increased after the dissolution of the Soviet Union due to shortages in the fuel necessary to power the helicopters used for hunting them. The subspecies was nevertheless considered threatened by oil exploration.

== Bibliography ==
- Bibikov, D. I. (1975). "The Wolf in USSR". In Pimlott, D. H. (ed.). Wolves. Proceedings of the First Working Meeting of Wolf Specialists and of the First International Conference on the Conservation of the Wolf (PDF). Stockholm: IUCN Publications. pp. 29–36.
- Ellerman, J. R.; Morrison-Scott, T. C. S. (1951). Checklist of Palaearctic and Indian Mammals, 1758 to 1946. London: Trustees of the British Museum (Natural History).
- Gibson, N. (1996). Wolves. Colin Baxter Photography Ltd. ISBN 1-900455-12-9.
- Heptner, V. G.; Naumov, N. P. (1998). Mammals of the Soviet Union Vol. II Part 1a, Sirenia and Carnivora (Sea cows; Wolves and Bears). Science Publishers, Inc. USA. ISBN 978-1-886106-81-9.
- Kerr, R. (1792). The animal kingdom, or zoological system, of the celebrated Sir Charles Linnæus: containing a complete systematic description, arrangement, and nomenclature, of all the known species and varieties of the mammalia, or animals which give suck to their young. Printed for A. Strahan, and T. Cadell, London, and W. Creech, Edinburgh. "γ. White Wolf.—C. Lupus albus.
  Of a white colour. Muller. Russ. Sam. iii. 527.
  This variety is found near the Jenisea, in the eastern parts of Asiatic Russia, and is much valued on account of its fur."
- Mech, L. D. (1981). The Wolf: The Ecology and Behaviour of an Endangered Species. University of Minnesota Press. ISBN 978-0-8166-1026-6.
- Sokolov, V. E.; Rossolimo, O. L. (1985). "Sistematika i izmenchivost'". In Bibikov, D. I. (ed.). Volk. Proiskhozhdeniye, sistematika, morfologiya, ekologiya (in Russian). Moscow: Nauka. pp. 21–50. "Диагноз. Размеры крупные – средняя кондилобазальная длина черепа в разных популяциях у самцов 246,6-248,4, у самок – 235,7 мм. Окраска светлая, преимущественно серая или серо-голыбоватая, иногда с рыжеватым или желтоватым оттенком. Черные остевые волосы образыют влодь жребта довольно широкий ремень.
  Распространение. Материковая тундра и лесотундра Евразии, северная часть тайти Европы и Азии, Камчатка.
  Притечание. Наиболее крупные волки Налеарктики уступают по размерам лишь североамериканскому подвиду C. l. occidentalis. В среднем несколько крупнее и светлее лесного волка Старого Света C. l. lupus. Немвого темнее и заметно крыпнее американского арктического волка C. l. arctos. От C. l. occidentalis отличается более мелкими размерами. Южная граница ареала подвида печеткая - он широко интерградирует с C. lupus."
