= SAFE13 study =

Survey of sociological field experiences of academic scientists

The Survey of Academic Field Experiences study, also known as the SAFE13 study, was a survey conducted between February and May 2013 in order to characterize experiences of scientists working at field sites as they relate to sexual harassment and sexual assault. It has had a significant impact on collective responses to sexual harassment and sexual assault in Western academic science.

Published in 2014 by a team of anthropologists, Kathryn B. H. Clancy, Robin G. Nelson, Julienne N. Rutherford and Katie Hinde, the SAFE13 study is the first empirical investigation into scientists' experiences of harassment during fieldwork. The researchers identify three key takeaways from their work. First, women scientists are targeted more often than men, and junior scientists are also more likely to be harassed relative to senior scientists. Second, women are more likely to be harassed by senior staff, while men are harassed by their peers. Third, the majority of field scientists do not know how to report harassment.

== Methods ==
The study included responses from 666 field scientists (77.5% were women and 85.9% of participants identified as heterosexual). The survey was conducted in two waves. The first wave ran from February 21 to April 12, 2013, and captured responses from biological anthropologists. The second wave, running from April 13 to May 10, collected responses from scientists in other disciplines. A further 26 interviews were completed to explore more in-depth experiences of sexual harassment in a broad range of fieldwork sites. The respondents were asked about experiences had at any time during their career.

The survey was not designed to estimate the prevalence of sexual harassment or assault at field sites. It was conducted online and offered anonymity, suggesting a potential self-selection bias. Only two questions in the survey directly queried the behavior experienced by respondents:

32. Have you ever personally experienced inappropriate or sexual remarks, comments about physical beauty, cognitive sex differences, or other jokes, at an anthropological field site?

39. Have you ever experienced physical sexual harassment, unwanted sexual contact, or sexual contact in which you could not or did not give consent or felt it would be unsafe to fight back or not give your consent at an anthropological field site?

An affirmative response to question 32 was counted as a report of sexual harassment, while an affirmative response to question 39 was counted as sexual assault, including rape.

== Findings ==
Almost three-quarters of participants (72.4%) had directly observed or been told about inappropriate behaviour or sexual comments during fieldwork. Around two-thirds of participants (64%) had personally experienced sexual language in the field and 20% of participants had experienced unwanted sexual contact. The study presented these findings as reports of "sexual harassment" and "sexual assault" respectively, though respondents were not asked whether they had been sexually harassed or assaulted. Following conventions in this area of scholarship, the study counted all "sexual remarks" as sexual harassment and all "unwanted sexual contact" as sexual assault.

The majority of people who experienced sexual harassment and assault were students and postdoctoral candidates. Perpetrators vary according to their target's gender: women are more likely to be harassed by superiors (senior people who have authority over them), while men are more likely to be harassed by their peers. Few people were sexually harassed by local members of the public, and instead the harassment occurred between colleagues in the field.

The SAFE13 study identifies several areas of improvement in combating sexual harassment in the field. For example, only around one-third of field scientists (37.7%) recalled a code of conduct operating at their fieldwork site, and less than one-quarter remembered there being anti-harassment policies. Amongst respondents who had experienced sexual harassment or assault, only one-fifth of survivors (20% each of women and men) knew of an easy way to formally report this experience. Amongst the small minority of people who did report sexual harassment and assault, less than 20% were satisfied with the outcome. The study therefore contributes to a body of empirical studies showing workplace sexual harassment negatively impacts personal safety and professional productivity. In particular, the study shines attention on the role of fieldwork site directors in establishing clear rules to discourage sexual harassment.

== SAFE2 ==
In 2017, the qualitative findings of SAFE13 were published. Authored by Nelson, Rutherford, Hinde and Clancy, the study focused on the experiences of 26 interviewees, who were mostly anthropologists or archaeologists (23 of 26 interviewees), women (23 of 26), and white (21 of 26). Some participants described incidents of sexual harassment in multiple fieldwork sites, so fifty-four field contexts are represented in their narratives. Twelve participants recalled working at field sites with clear anti-harassment rules (representing 18 fieldwork sites). These sites had training, explicit conversations, and senior researchers modelled proactive behaviour to redress sexual harassment. Actively enforced anti-harassment policies were associated with positive fieldwork experiences where scientists felt safe, valued and equal. These sites were categorised by the researchers as "green" contexts where best practice was enforced by senior members of the research team. As a result there were fewer negative experiences, and transgressions were acted upon by leaders.

The rest of the participants described ambiguity or lack of clarity about codes of conduct. Even if they had some rules, sexual harassment still took place because were no consequences. Ambiguity led to repercussions for scientists who resisted sexual coercion, such as being alienated from colleagues and being denied professional opportunities. Harassment and negative fieldwork experiences also led to negative letters of employment, strained workplace relationships, career stalling, being forced to move to another site, or leaving their careers. The hostility would be continued into the future in other contexts, such as at conferences. Some participants were discouraged or prevented from taking formal reporting action by administrators. The researchers call ambiguous sites "yellow" contexts because if there was a vague set of rules, they were not consistently applied. "Red" contexts are fieldwork sites where there is both an absence of rules and consequences.

SAFE2 and SAFE13 are recognised as having led to concrete institutional and policy changes in academic science.

== Academic and public impact ==
Prior to its final publication, the evolving findings of the SAFE13 study received media coverage in 2013, with a focus on how sexual harassment creates a "chilly climate" in science. Public discussion of the evolving study's findings explored the negative impact of harassment on junior women researchers. Media articles focused on fear of professional retribution if scientists report sexual harassment. Other science publishers discussed the sense of powerless that both victims and bystanders face as harassment goes unpunished.

After the final report was published, the study became widely cited as evidence that sexual harassment contributes to women leaving science careers. Professional scientific societies publicly responded that, beyond making principal researchers responsible for reporting sexual harassment, institutional responses were additionally required.

The SAFE13 study inspired women scientists in other fields to conduct similar surveys into sexual harassment. It also paved the way for larger institutional surveys on harassment by professional societies. The SAFE13 study is referenced in high-profile cases, to contextualise the institutional dynamics that enable harassment to continue over many years. The study has had a major impact on American astronomy and physics in particular, as these disciplines increasingly grapple with public incidents of harassment.

In 2016, USA Rep. Jackie Speier of California sponsored a bill to compel research institutions to report investigations of harassment as a condition of receiving federal grant money. She cited the SAFE13 study as one piece of evidence informing the bill. She also referred to SAFE13 in media interviews. In February 2018, the USA National Science Foundation (NSF) announced it would require institutions to report whenever a researcher who is funded by their grants has engaged in sexual harassment. The NSF also expects institutions they fund to provide a harassment-free workplace. The NSF Office of Diversity and Inclusion will additionally provide policies and resources to support this aim, and create an anonymous reporting system to receive direct reports of sexual harassment. The NSF is one of various science agencies under pressure by the USA Congress to counter sexual harassment. This represents a major cultural change in scientific science since the SAFE13 study first recommended a review of institutional responses to harassment.

On 27 February 2018, lead researcher of the SAFE13 study, Kathryn (Kate) Clancy, provided testimony to the Subcommittee on Research and Technology Hearing on sexual harassment in science. The hearing identified a need to redress sexual harassment in science as a way to boost opportunities in science. Clancy testified that creating a safe, harassment-free workplace culture was imperative to improving science.

Five years after its preliminary findings were released, the SAFE13 study continues to be referenced in various media articles exploring how victims of sexual harassment are punished when they report harassment. SAFE13 has also been cited as an important resource in responding to the aftermath of the #MeToo movement in 2017, by providing systematic context of sexual harassment.

Since 2013, scientists have consistently used the hashtag #SAFE13 in connection to other research on sexual harassment, as well as to discuss media reports and investigations on sexual harassment in science and academia, and to share personal experiences of harassment in academic science.
