= Kathryn B. H. Clancy =

American biological anthropologist

Kathryn Clancy
- Born: Kathryn Bridges Harley Clancy; July 16, 1979 (age 47)

Academic background
- Education: Harvard University (BA); Yale University (PhD)
- Thesis: Two new models for human endometrial function : results from the United States and rural Poland (2007)
- Doctoral advisor: Richard G. Bribiescas

Academic work
- Discipline: Anthropology
- Sub-discipline: Biological anthropology
- Institutions: Yale University; Harvard University; University of Illinois Urbana-Champaign
- Website: kateclancy.com

Kathryn Bridges Harley Clancy is an American biological anthropologist who is a full professor at the University of Illinois Urbana-Champaign. Her additional research and policy advocacy work focuses on sexual harassment in science and academia.

== Education ==
Clancy graduated with a Bachelor of Arts degree from Harvard University in 2001, specializing in Biological Anthropology and Women's Studies. She obtained her PhD in Anthropology from Yale University in 2007.

== Career and research ==
In 2006, Clancy worked as a lecturer at Yale University. One year later, she joined Harvard University as Preceptor Faculty and Associate at the Department of Anthropology. She has worked at the University of Illinois since 2008, where she started as a lecturer and became full professor in Anthropology in 2022. Clancy currently leads the Clancy Lab group within the Laboratory for Evolutionary Endocrinology at the University of Illinois. She is also Co-Director of the Laboratory.

Since September 2016, Clancy has hosted the Period Podcast, where she discusses issues regarding the science of menstrual cycles. This theme is connected to her early research.

=== Fertility research ===
Clancy's fertility research focuses on menstruation and variability in endometrial function. Clancy's early published research demonstrated that, contrary to previous belief, menstruation does not increase risk for iron-deficiency anemia. Instead, Clancy and colleagues show that a thicker endometrium is associated with greater iron reserves amongst healthy women. Clancy's later studies focus on rural Polish populations. Clancy explores potential variation amongst endometrial function, or the functions of the inner mucous membrane layer of the uterus. Her research finds that endometrial thickness is negatively correlated over the latter phase of the menstrual cycle (the luteal phase).

Clancy's research contributes to understandings of fertility variation amongst normal, premenopausal Western women. For example, Swedish women appear to show an increase in endometrial thickness in the early part of the luteal phase, while for Canadian and English women, patterns appear largely stable at similar times. Canadian and Swedish women's endometrial thickness drops at other times, and while for Scottish sample, there is an increase. Clancy and colleagues' research suggests that endometrial thickness should be measured daily to better capture and study this variation.

Clancy has also made a broader contribution to the study of human evolutionary biology and ecological stress on ovaries and endometrial function. She finds that immune stress and psychosocial stress impacts on the endometrium's ability to carry a fetus through the mechanism of inflammation.

Clancy's later research focuses on primate development. She has also dispelled the myth that women's menstrual cycles can become synchronised due to their close social bonds.

=== Sexual harassment research ===
Clancy is part of a team of anthropologists who led the "Survey of Academic Field Experiences" study, also known as SAFE13. The study, co-authored with Robin G. Nelson, Julienne N. Rutherford and Katie Hinde, analysed experiences of sexual harassment and sexual assault in scientific fieldwork sites. The study found the majority of researchers had been exposed to, or experienced, sexual harassment, especially women and junior scientists.

A follow-up study (known as "SAFE 2"), led by Nelson, Rutherford, Hinde and Clancy identified systemic patterns that lead to negative fieldwork experiences and harassment. Field sites that have clear codes of conduct and consequences for behaviour are less likely to lead to sexual harassment. Where problems arise, these sites deal with issues swiftly and consistently, leading to higher levels of perceived safety and equality. In fieldwork sites where clear rules and consequences do not exist or are ambiguous, leaders do not take action against harassment. This leads to ongoing alienation and professional retaliation.

The SAFE13 study and subsequent research and activities (media interviews, conferences and advocacy) have made significant impact on increasing awareness of institutional responses to sexual harassment, as well as policy reform. On 27 February 2018, Clancy, provided testimony to the Subcommittee on Research and Technology Hearing on sexual harassment in science. Clancy testified that creating a safe, harassment-free workplace culture was imperative to improving science.

=== Racism and gender harassment ===
In 2017, Clancy led another study on sexual harassment in collaboration with Katharine M. N. Lee, Erica M. Rodgers and Christina Richey. The research involved an online survey of 474 astronomers and planetary scientists. It is the first study of its kind in the physical sciences, and it is the first large study to examine both gender and racial harassment in academic science.

The study finds that 88% of participants had heard negative language at work, along with other verbal and physical abuse that made them feel unsafe. Women of colour, however, experienced the greatest level of hostility due to their race and gender. They experienced greater incidents of gendered and racialised harassment and were more attuned to noticing other forms of harassment such as homophobia. Forty percent of women of colour feel unsafe at work due to their gender or sex, and 28% due to their race. Women of colour are also more likely to skip educational and professional opportunities, such as meetings and conferences, in an attempt to minimise exposure to hostility and harassment.

The study received wide media coverage, as it provided evidence on how harassment limits women's career outcomes, especially for racial minority women. Clancy also noted that the study unearths how survivors are re-traumatised by existing reporting systems that have no intermediary level of support in between staying silent and launching a formal report. The study has been commended for showing how racial discrimination compounds experiences of sexual harassment. The study also shows that the impact of harassment contributes to a higher loss of women of colour in science relative to White women scientists. The study raises questions about bystander interventions, given the hostile culture towards women of colour is evident to witnesses, who do not feel empowered to act.

Clancy served on the National Academies of Sciences, Engineering, and Medicine's 2018 consensus report entitled "Sexual Harassment of Women: Climate, Culture, and Consequences in Academic Sciences, Engineering, and Medicine."

== Bibliography ==
- Clancy, Kate (2023). Period: The Real Story of Menstruation. Princeton University Press. ISBN 978-0-691-19131-7.
