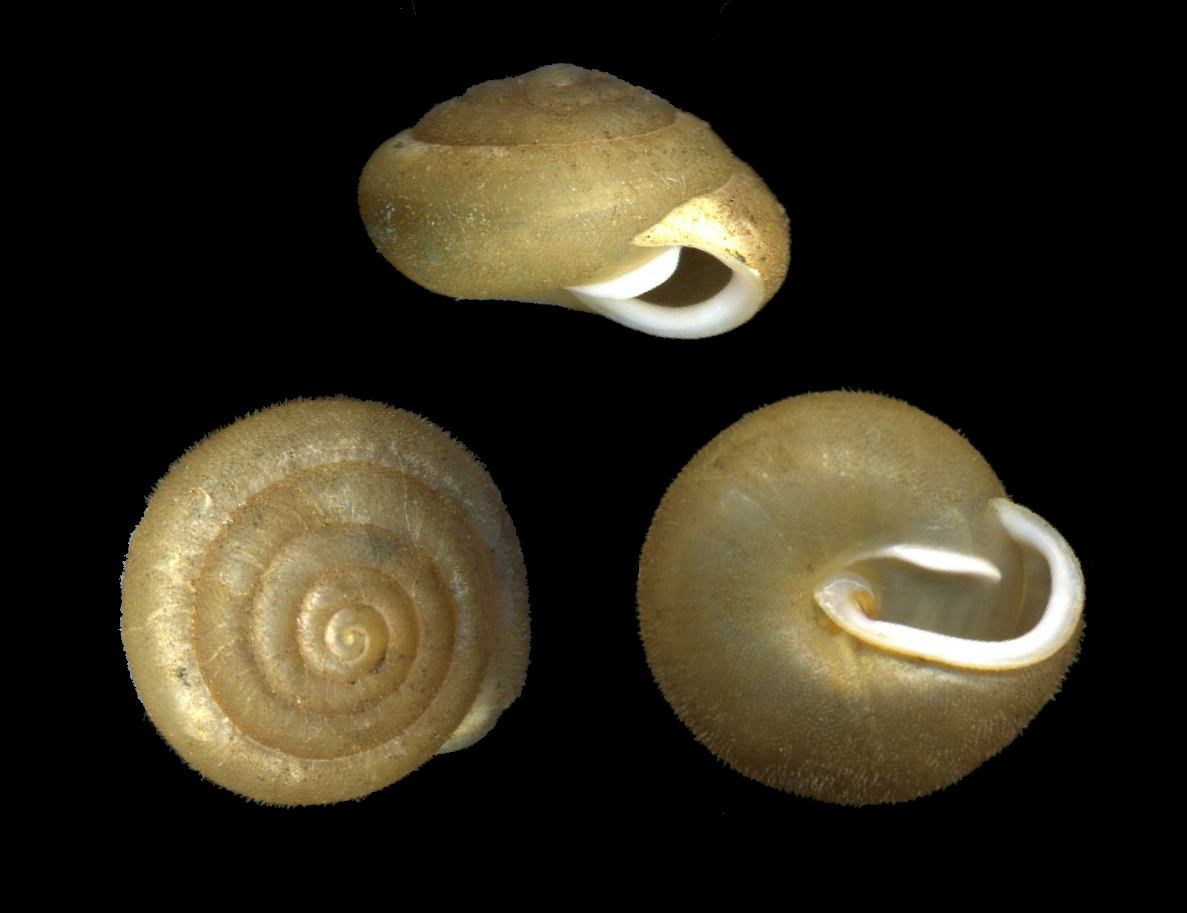
- Three views of a shell of Euchemotrema fraternum

Scientific classification
- Kingdom: Animalia
- Phylum: Mollusca
- Class: Gastropoda
- Order: Stylommatophora
- Family: Polygyridae
- Subfamily: Triodopsinae
- Tribe: Stenotrematini
- Genus: Euchemotrema; Archer, 1939

= Euchemotrema =

Genus of gastropods

Euchemotrema is a genus of small, air-breathing land snails, terrestrial pulmonate gastropod molluscs in the family Polygyridae.

== Shell description ==
The shell of species in this genus is usually about 8 to 11 mm in diameter (about 3/8 inch). The shells are brown with a velvety surface, similar to that of Stenotrema, and, in fact, this genus is sometimes combined into Stenotrema. These snails typically have a less complex aperture than Stenotrema: "without a tooth within the outer arc of the lip and with no notch in the basal lip".

There are also peculiarities of the male anatomy that separate the two genera.

== Distribution ==
Euchemotrema is widely distributed in eastern and central North America.

== Species ==
This genus includes the following species and subspecies:

- Euchemotrema cheatumi (R. W. Fullington, 1974)
- Euchemotrema fasciatum (Pilsbry, 1940)
- Euchemotrema fraternum (Say, 1824)
  - Euchemotrema fraternum montanum (Archer, 1939)
- Euchemotrema hubrichti (Pilsbry, 1940) / Stenotrema hubrichti Pilsbry, 1940
- Euchemotrema leaii (Binney, 1841)
- Euchemotrema leai aliciae (Pilsbry, 1893)
- Euchemotrema wichitorum (Branson, 1972) Wichita Mountains pillsnail
