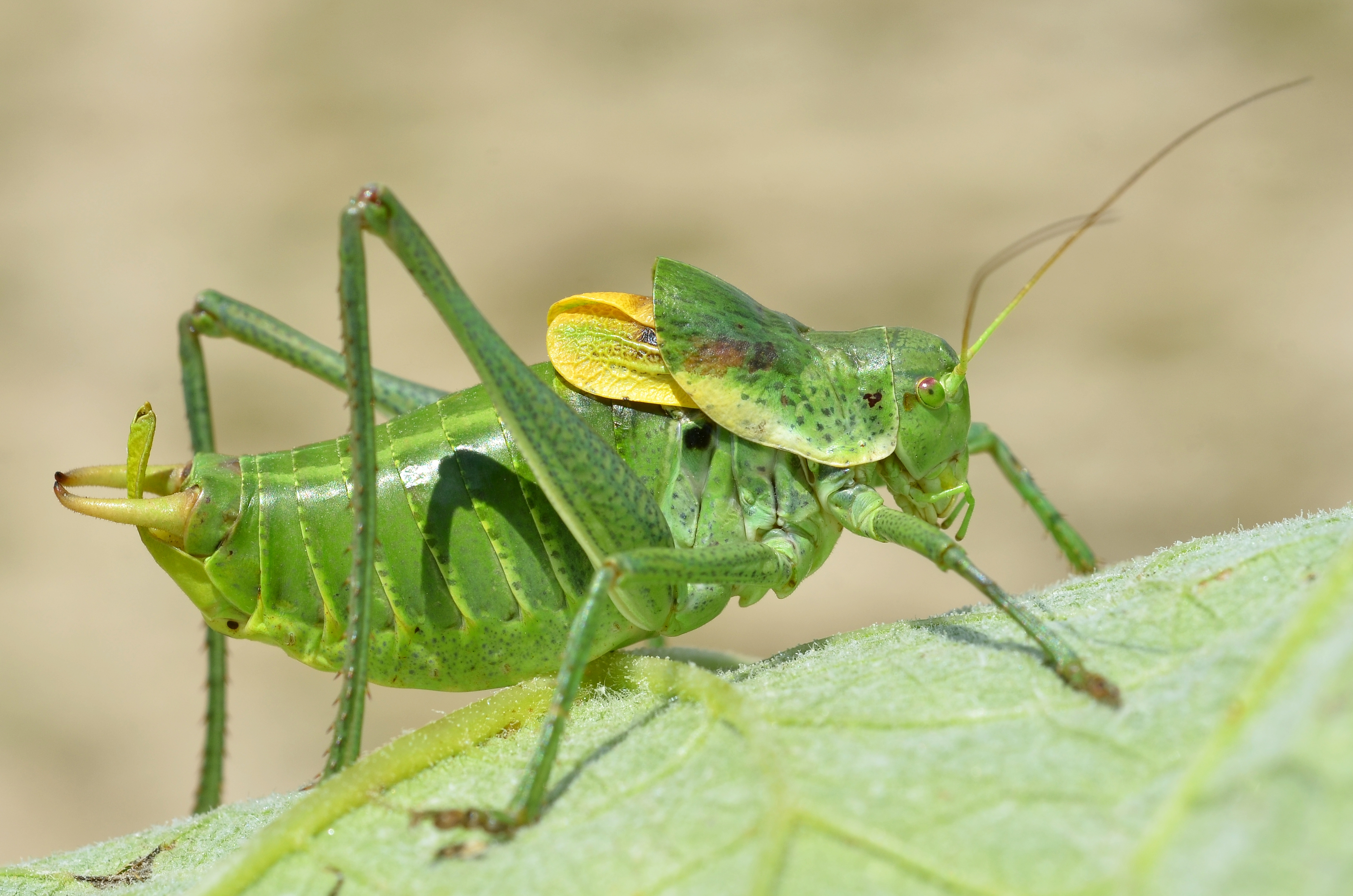
- Polysarcus denticauda male

Scientific classification
- Domain: Eukaryota
- Kingdom: Animalia
- Phylum: Arthropoda
- Class: Insecta
- Order: Orthoptera
- Suborder: Ensifera
- Family: Tettigoniidae
- Subfamily: Phaneropterinae
- Tribe: Barbitistini
- Genus: Polysarcus; Fieber, 1853

Synonyms
- Hadrosoma Fieber, 1853; Orphania Fischer, 1853

= Polysarcus =

Genus of cricket-like animal

Polysarcus is a genus of bush crickets in the subfamily Phaneropterinae and tribe Barbitistini. Species can be found in western Europe (but not the British Isles or Scandinavia), Middle East through to Afghanistan.

== Species ==
The Orthoptera Species File lists:

1. Polysarcus denticauda (Charpentier, 1825) - type species
2. Polysarcus elbursianus (Uvarov, 1930)
3. Polysarcus scutatus (Brunner von Wattenwyl, 1882)
4. Polysarcus zacharovi (Stshelkanovtzev, 1910)
5. Polysarcus zigana Ünal & Chobanov, 2013

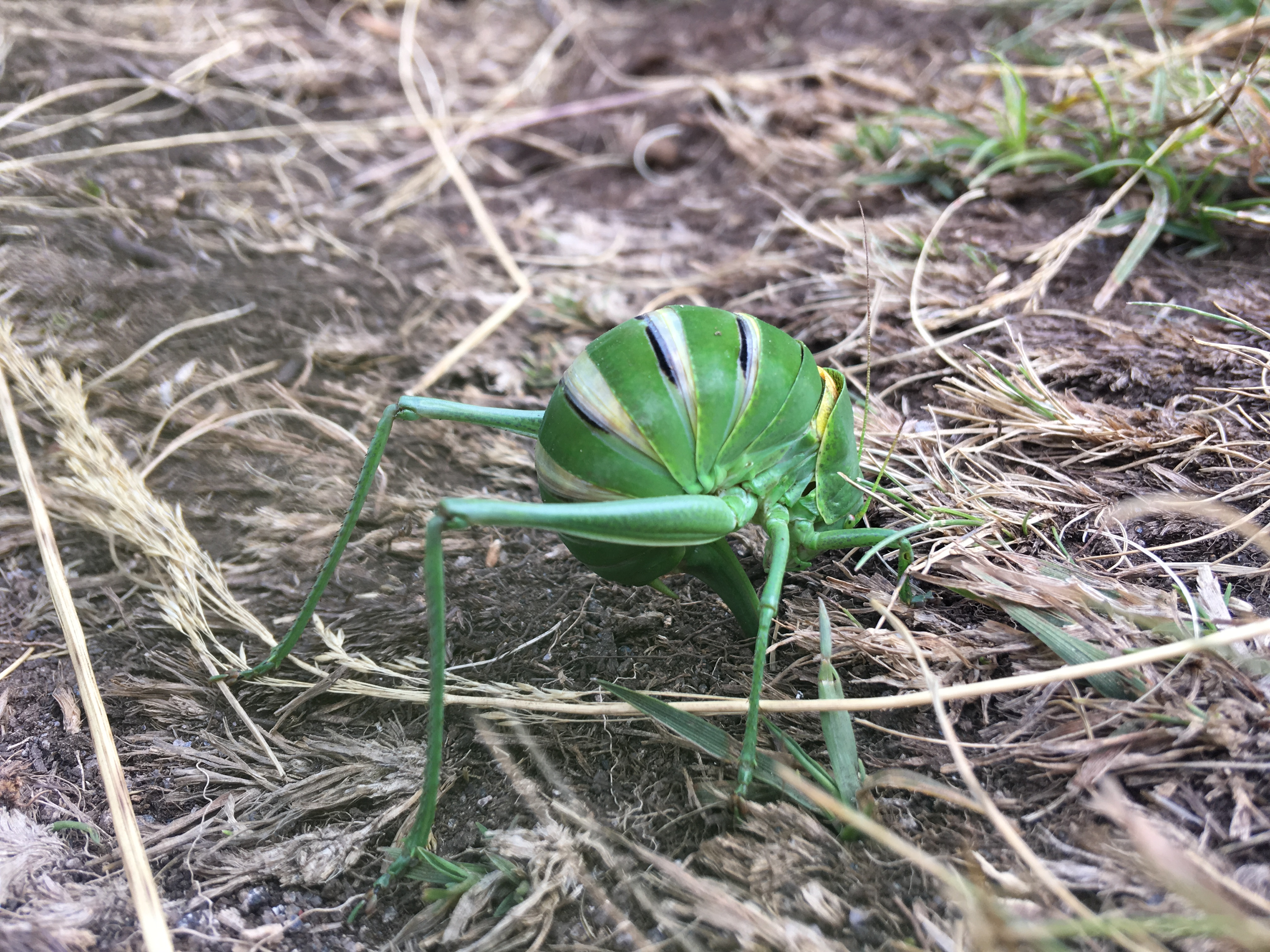
Polysarcus scutatus ovipositing female
