= Melissa A. Wilson =

American computational evolutionary biologist

- Born: Stillwater, Oklahoma
- Citizenship: United States
- Education: Creighton University (BS: Medical Mathematics), Pennsylvania State University (PhD: Integrative Biology)
- Known for: Science Communication, research on sex chromosomes
- Spouse: Scott Sayres (m. 2010, divorced 2019)
- Scientific career
- Thesis: (2011)
- Doctoral advisor: Kateryna Makova
- Website: www.sexchrlab.org

Melissa A. Wilson is an evolutionary and computational biologist and assistant professor at Arizona State University who studies the evolution of sex chromosomes.

== Personal life and education ==
Wilson was born in Stillwater, Oklahoma, and lived there until she was five, then moving to Garland, Texas, then Tempe, Arizona, then to Syracuse, Nebraska. She graduated from Syracuse High School in Nebraska and received her B.S. in Medical Mathematics with Honors in May 2005 from Creighton University under Lance Nielsen.

She received her Ph.D. in integrative biology at Pennsylvania State University under her thesis advisor Kateryna Makova in 2011. She then completed a postdoctoral fellowship under Rasmus Nielsen at UC Berkeley in 2014.

She was professionally known as Melissa A. Wilson Sayres from 2010 until her divorce from Scott Sayres, a physical chemist, in 2019. Together they have one daughter.

== Career ==
Wilson is an assistant professor of genomics, evolution, and bioinformatics at Arizona State University. There she is PI of the Sex Chromosome Lab, where she studies genome evolution, mutation rate variation, and population history. One finding of her lab is that crossing over between the X and Y chromosomes occurs in some regions of the chromosomes more often than was previously thought. Another discovery is that the Y chromosome is not decreasing in size, which contradicts previously publicised claims that the Y chromosome might disappear.

She also discovered evidence of a Y chromosome population bottleneck in human history. Wilson hypothesised that a possible explanation for this was partially cultural, saying ""Instead of 'survival of the fittest' in a biological sense, the accumulation of wealth and power may have increased the reproductive success of a limited number of 'socially fit' males and their sons."

The lab uses the Gila monster as a model organism to understand the evolution of sex chromosomes. As part of her research, she started a crowdfunding campaign which successfully raised over $10,000 to sequence the Gila monster's DNA. She has referred to the animals as "cool" and "lovable."

Wilson holds one patent for tumor treatments, and is the developer of several software packages, including XYalign, for accurately aligning sex chromosomes, and TumorSim, for simulating tumor heterogeneity.

== Science communication ==
Wilson is active in public outreach. She is a regular on the ASU "Ask a Scientist" podcast and has been interviewed by the New York Times, The Atlantic, Smithsonian Magazine, and the Pacific Standard, among others, as an expert on genetics. She has also publicly spoken out against the use of science to justify white supremacy and transphobia, and against the maltreatment of victims of sexual assault.

== Publications and awards ==
=== Selected publications ===
- Wilson Sayres, Melissa A (February 21, 2018). "Genetic Diversity on the Sex Chromosomes". Genome Biology and Evolution. 10 (4): 1064–1078. doi:10.1093/gbe/evy039. ISSN 1759-6653. PMC 5892150. PMID 29635328.
- Wilson Sayres, Melissa A.; Lohmueller, Kirk E.; Nielsen, Rasmus (January 9, 2014). Payseur, Bret A. (ed.). "Natural Selection Reduced Diversity on Human Y Chromosomes". PLOS Genetics. 10 (1) e1004064. doi:10.1371/journal.pgen.1004064. ISSN 1553-7404. PMC 3886894. PMID 24415951.
- Wilson Sayres, Melissa A.; Makova, Kateryna D. (December 4, 2012). "Gene Survival and Death on the Human Y Chromosome". Molecular Biology and Evolution. 30 (4): 781–787. doi:10.1093/molbev/mss267. ISSN 1537-1719. PMC 3603307. PMID 23223713.
- Wilson, Melissa A.; Makova, Kateryna D. (September 2009). "Genomic Analyses of Sex Chromosome Evolution". Annual Review of Genomics and Human Genetics. 10 (1): 333–354. doi:10.1146/annurev-genom-082908-150105. ISSN 1527-8204. PMID 19630566.

=== Selected awards ===
- 2019 Awardee, Mary Lyon Award, International Mammalian Genome Society
- 2018 Awardee, SMBE Allan Wilson Junior Award for Independent Research
- 2018 Awardee Zebulon Pearce Distinguished Teaching Award, Arizona State University
- 2010 First Place Award, Genome Research poster competition at CSH: The Biology of Genomes
- 2008 Women In Science and Engineering Outstanding Service Award
- 2006 The Pennsylvania State University NSF GRFP Incentive Award
- 2005 Creighton University Outstanding Mathematician Award
