= Katie Hinde =

American evolutionary biologist

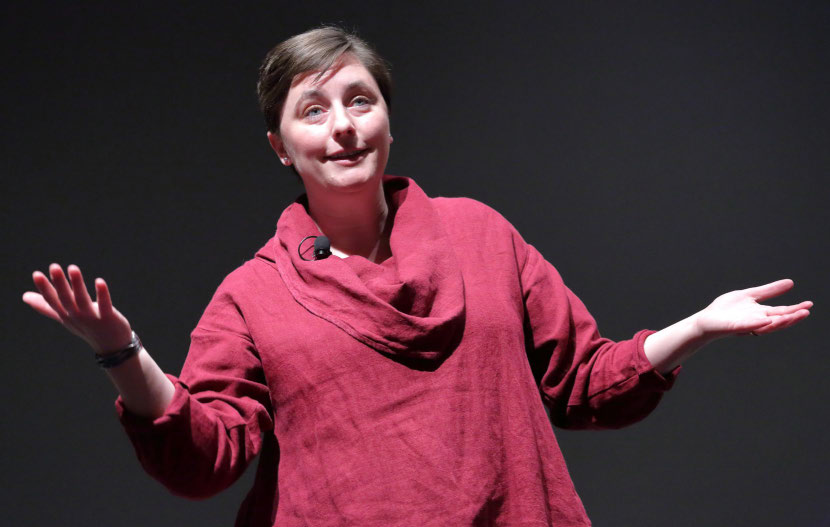
- Hinde speaks at the National Institutes of Health in 2016
- Born: 1980 or 1981 (age 44–45)
- Education: University of California, Los Angeles; University of Washington
- Awards: NCSE Friend of Darwin Award (2025)
- Scientific career
- Fields: Human Evolution and Social Change
- Workplaces: Arizona State University; Harvard University; California National Primate Research Center

Dr Katherine (Katie) Hinde is an associate professor in the School of Human Evolution and Social Change at Arizona State University, where she researches lactation. She is also a science writer and science communicator.

== Education ==
Hinde attended Seattle Central College and was part of the Running Start and College Transfer programs. She earned a bachelor's of arts in anthropology from the University of Washington in 1999. She joined University of California, Los Angeles (UCLA) for her doctoral studies, where she was awarded the Chancellor’s Dissertation Fellowship in 2007. She completed her PhD at UCLA in 2008.

== Career ==
Hinde served as a postdoctoral scholar in neuroscience in the Brain, Mind, and Behavior Unit of California National Primate Research Center at UC Davis until 2009. She joined Harvard University as an assistant professor in 2011, where she remained until 2015.

Hinde is now the director of the Comparative Lactation Lab at Arizona State University. Here she investigates the hormones, food and medicine contained within mother's milk. She argues that we know twice as much about erectile dysfunction as we do about breast milk. Hinde identified that the combination of fat, protein, mineral, sugar, bacteria and hormones contained within mother's milk are equivalent to fingerprints and influence infant outcomes from postnatal life to adulthood. Human breast milk contains oligosaccharides, of which there are more than 200 varieties. These cannot be digested by babies, but instead provide the right community of microbes to prevent pathogens from establishing. Hinde identified that the milk of female monkeys who are younger or are earlier in their reproductive phase contained fewer calories and more of the stress hormone cortisol than that of their older counterparts. She found that more cortisol contributes to infants that grow faster but are more nervous and less confident.

Hinde was recognised as a young researcher who has made outstanding, original scientific contributions to the study of human milk. She was a member of the Executive Council of the International Society for Research in Human Milk and Lactation. Her research has been featured in National Geographic, Slate (magazine), Science News, The Washington Times and The New York Times. She speaks regularly at international conferences.

== Public engagement ==
In 2011 Hinde began the popular science blog "Mammals Suck ... Milk!", which has since had over one million views. She was associate editor of Splash! Milk Science Update from 2012 to 2018. She created Mammal March Madness in 2013, a month of science outreach events used in classrooms across America. She was co-editor and co-author of the 2013 text Building Babies. She appeared on the Center for Academic Research and Training in Anthropogeny YouTube channel, discussing Childrearing in Human Evolution. She was a guest on the comedy show "You're the Expert" with Wyatt Cenac. In 2016 Hinde was named the Milk Maven in Grist 50, an annual list of 50 notable Americans contributing to the climate movement. She is part of the SAFE13 study, which looks to expose how widespread sexual harassment and assault are in scientific fieldwork. In 2017 Hinde delivered a TED talk What we don't know about mother's milk. In 2020, she was featured in the Netflix docuseries, "Babies."

== Awards ==
2025 - Friend of Darwin award, National Center for Science Education

2016 – Ehrlich-Koldovsky Early Career Award, International Society for Research in Human Milk & Lactation

2016 – Sustainability Innovators, Organizers, & Visionaries #Grist50 Grist Magazine

2014 – Early Career Achievement Award, American Society of Primatologists

2014 – Distinguished Alumni Award, Seattle Central College

2013 – Most Valuable Presentation Award 10th Annual Milk Genomics and Human Health Meeting
