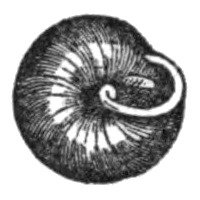
- Umbilical view of the shell of Euchemotrema leaii

Conservation status
- Secure (NatureServe)

Scientific classification
- Kingdom: Animalia
- Phylum: Mollusca
- Class: Gastropoda
- Order: Stylommatophora
- Family: Polygyridae
- Genus: Euchemotrema
- Species: E. leaii

Binomial name
- Euchemotrema leaii (Binney, 1841)

Synonyms
- Helix leaii Binney, 1840; Stenotrema leai (Binney, 1840); Stenotrema leaii (Binney, 1840)

= Euchemotrema leaii =

Species of gastropod

Euchemotrema leaii, common name the lowland pillsnail, is a species of air-breathing land snail, a terrestrial pulmonate gastropod mollusc in the family Polygyridae.
