= Kateryna Makova =

Ukrainian-American biologist

Kateryna D. Makova
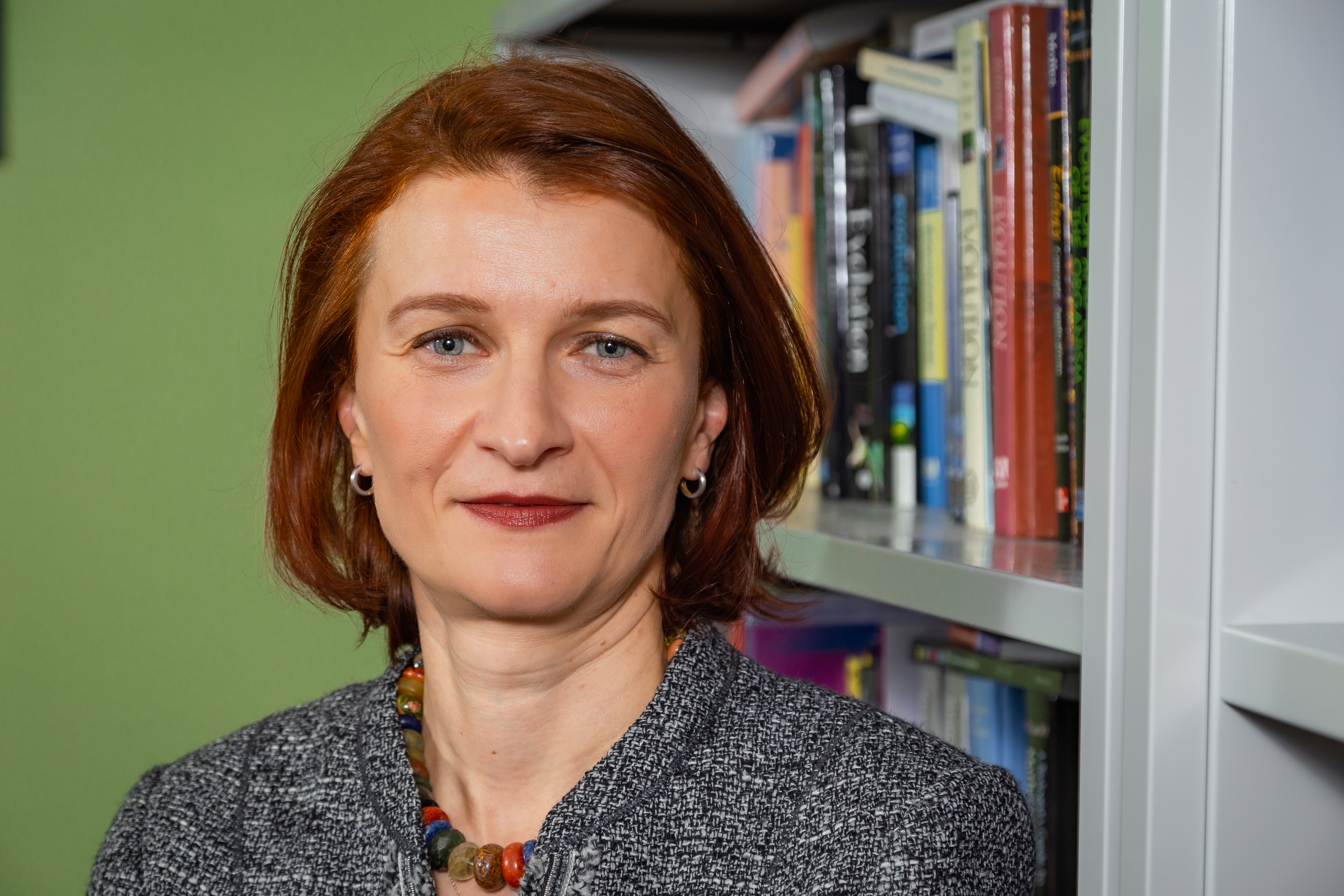
- Makova in 2019
- Born: Kyiv, Ukraine
- Education: Kiev State University (MS); Texas Tech University (PhD)
- Occupation: Biologist

Kateryna D. Makova is a Ukrainian-American biologist, currently the Verne M. Willaman Chair of Life Sciences and professor in the Department of Biology in the Eberly College of Science at Pennsylvania State University. She is also a published author, being widely cited by her peers and widely held in libraries.
