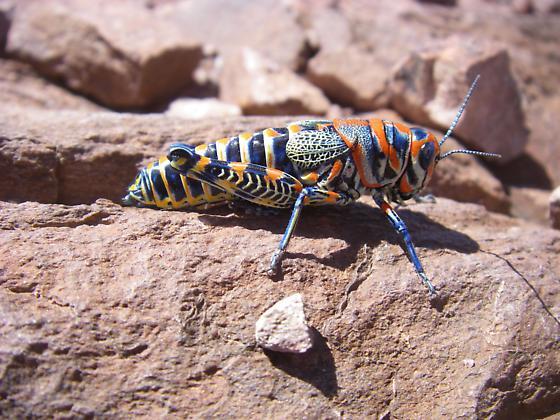

Scientific classification
- Kingdom: Animalia
- Phylum: Arthropoda
- Clade: Pancrustacea
- Class: Insecta
- Order: Orthoptera
- Suborder: Caelifera
- Family: Acrididae
- Genus: Dactylotum
- Species: D. bicolor

Binomial name
- Dactylotum bicolor Charpentier, 1843

= Dactylotum bicolor =

Species of grasshopper

Dactylotum bicolor, also known as the rainbow grasshopper, painted grasshopper, pictured grasshopper, or the barber pole grasshopper, is a species of grasshopper in the family Acrididae. It is native to the United States, Canada and northern Mexico and exhibits aposematism (warning coloration). It was first described by the German entomologist Toussaint de Charpentier in 1843.

== Description ==
Dactylotum bicolor grows to an average length of about 20 mm (0.8 in) for males and 35 mm (1.4 in) for females. It is mainly black with distinctive reddish and yellowish markings, a pale green prothorax and pale green wingpads. The tibia of the hind leg bears six to eight spines. This species does not develop wings and is unable to fly.

Three subspecies are recognised:

- D. b. bicolor – Northern Texas, New Mexico and Mexico
- D. b. pictum – Northern and eastern part of range
- D. b. variegatum – Southern Arizona and western part of range

The coloring varies across the insect's range, with D. b. pictum being black with little red, D. b. variegatum having distinct red markings, and D. b. bicolor having a purplish or violet sheen to the background black color.

Before the discovery of Dichroplus silveiraguidoi in Uruguay in 1956, Dactylotum bicolor had the lowest known number of chromosomes among grasshopper species, with seventeen acrocentric chromosomes.

== Distribution and habitat ==
It is found in shortgrass prairie, desert grasslands, thinly vegetated areas and alfalfa fields throughout the western Great Plains of the United States (and southern Canada), southward to Arizona, New Mexico, Texas, and into northern Mexico.

== Biology ==
Its eggs are laid in soft soil in several batches of about one hundred. These overwinter and hatch in late spring or early summer, with adults being present until September or October. There is a single generation each year.

Although adult rainbow grasshoppers are polyphagous and feed on many species of plant, the nymphs feed entirely on Wright's false willow (Baccharis wrightii) in Arizona and New Mexico. It has been found that the nymphs orient themselves relative to the sun, positioning themselves around the bush so as to thermoregulate (keep their body temperature within an acceptable range). In the morning and evening they feed near the ground in full sun, but at midday they move to the shady center. At night they roost in upper branches of the bush, but this may primarily be to avoid ground-based predators.

The insect's coloration was shown to be aposematic in an experiment of predation by little striped whiptail lizards. These brightly-colored grasshoppers were less attractive to the lizards as food than cryptically-colored Trimerotropis sp of similar size, even though the lizards were unfamiliar with the rainbow grasshopper, which was not present in their natural habitat. The lizards may previously have encountered other prey with warning colors such as stink bugs, seed bugs, or velvet ants. The rainbow grasshopper is also distasteful to birds.
