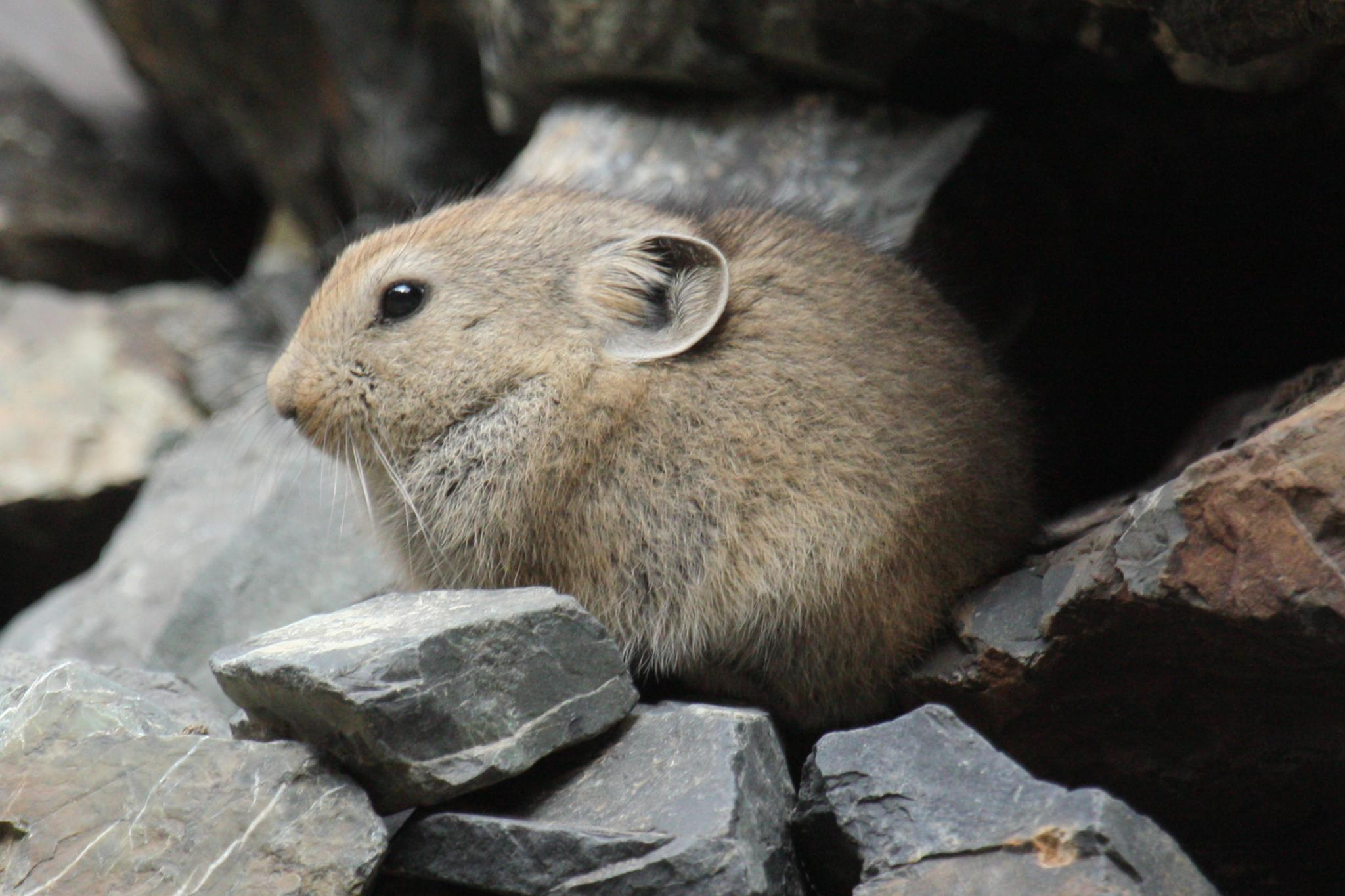

Conservation status
- Least Concern (IUCN 3.1)

Scientific classification
- Kingdom: Animalia
- Phylum: Chordata
- Class: Mammalia
- Order: Lagomorpha
- Family: Ochotonidae
- Genus: Ochotona
- Species: O. pallasi

Binomial name
- Ochotona pallasi (J. E. Gray, 1867)
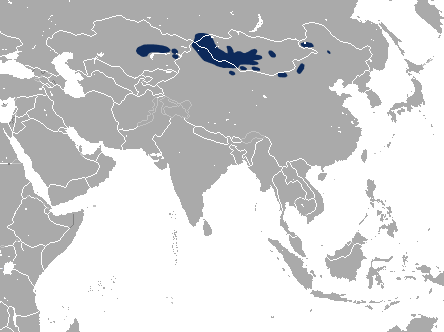
- Pallas's pika range (the Kazakhstan part is now assigned to Kazakh pika, O. opaca)

= Pallas's pika =

Species of mammal

Pallas's pika (Ochotona pallasi), also known as the Mongolian pika, is a species of small mammals in the pika family, Ochotonidae. It is found mainly in the mountains of western Mongolia.

== Description ==
Pallas's pika can range from anywhere between 175 and 200 grams (6.2 and 7.1 oz) in weight and can grow up to 25 centimetres (9.8 in) long. Pallas's pikas have round bodies, very short limbs, and small rounded ears. They will also have different pelage coloration depending on the time of the year. They become lighter in the summer and much darker in the winter.

== Ecology ==
=== Distribution and habitat ===
O. p. pallasi can be geographically separated from the other three subspecies. O. p. pallasi is largely distributed in Kazakhstan and the other large group O. p. pricei, are distributed along Mongolia and bordering territories. The range for both these groups extends all the way between the Betpak Dala Desert located in Kazakhstan to the Helan Shan Range. The remaining two, which have been little-studied, O. p. argentata collected mostly at the Helan Shan Range and the O. p. sunidica found mostly near the Chinese-Mongolian border, both of which found in rocky habitats with very restricted ranges.

=== Diet ===
Pallas's pikas are much smaller in body size than other herbivores that usually share the same environment. Their body size allows them to consume more of the lower level vegetation, giving them more of an advantage over larger herbivores, such as livestock. Like other pikas, Pallas's pika is herbivorous and saves grass in the summer to eat in the winter. They often construct haypiles with this stash, but some populations prefer to keep their stores under rocks. Their diet consists mostly of grasses, however their diet does range in flowers as well as stems. Like all lagomorphs (rabbits, hares, pikas), Pallas's pika creates, expels & eats cecotropes (cecotrophy) to get more nutrition from its food.

=== Ecosystem roles ===
Pallas's pika mostly are found in more arid type climates. They have shown to play a role in not only seed dispersal and vegetation, but the alteration of site conditions. This alteration through burrowing, has led to plant growth and increased soil nutrients. This is a clear representation of allogenic ecosystem engineering.

== Mating and reproduction ==
Pallas's pikas form monogamous pairs. The averages litter size is 5, with 2.7 litters per year; reproduction however only occurs in the summer. The young wean at 19 days and are sexually mature at 4 weeks.

== Physiology ==
The Pallas's pika and many other subspecies show a mechanism called microbial nitrogen fixation. This is a very important mechanism consisting of an isolation of a bacterial community in the cecum and colon of the Pika called the nifH gene. Since Pallas's pika's diet consist of such poor feed, they need to have an adaptation such as this in order to provide the essential amino acids to their diet. These essential amino acids are supplied by the microorganisms produced by microbial nitrogen fixations.

== Phylogeny and taxonomy ==
There are four defined taxa: O. p. pallasi, O. p. pricei, O. p. sunidica, and O. argentata. Mitochondrial studies show that the two larger defined taxa of O. pallasi are paraphyletic to O. argentata. However, morphometric data shows that the taxa O. p pricei and O. p. pallasii show similar traits to one other than to O. argentata. O. argentata differ in that they show a rufous type coloration in the summer and a more silver type coloration in the winter.

As a species, Pallas's pika is common. However, O. p. hamica, O. p. helanshanensis and O. p. sundica are rated as "critically endangered" and "endangered", respectively, on the IUCN Red List.
