= Vladimir Geptner =

Russian and Soviet zoologist (1901–1975)

- Geptner in 1923
- Born: 22 July 1901; Moscow
- Died: 5 July 1975 (aged 73)
- Other name: Vladimir Georgievich Heptner
- Education: Moscow University
- Known for: Biogeographic research
- Scientific career
- Fields: Zoology, with emphasis on mammals
- Workplaces: Moscow University
- Doctoral advisor: S.I. Ognev, G. A. Kozhevnikov

Vladimir Georgievich Geptner (or Heptner in English) (Russian: Владимир Георгиевич Гептнер; 22 June 1901 – 5 July 1975) was a Russian and Soviet zoologist who studied the mammals of the USSR and was a pioneer of biogeographic research.

== Biography ==
Geptner was born in Moscow where his father Georgi (Georg-Julius Andreevich Geptner; 1867–1935) was an accountant who had served in a Lutheran church before the Revolution. His mother Valeria Augstinovna née Kovalevskaya was of German Polish origin from Krotoshin near Poznan. He attended the Swiss Gymnasium. He then joined Moscow University in 1919 and attended classes by M. A. Menzbier. He served as a curator of the museum briefly and graduated in 1925. In 1920 he joined expeditions into Turgai, the Arctic and Voronezh region. In 1925 he became a graduate student of S.I. Ognev and G. A. Kozhevnikov. He graduated in 1929 and became an assistant professor and helped teach the systematics of vertebrates. In 1932 he became the head of the department of mammals. On February 16, 1933, he and his wife Nina Sergeevna Rudneva were arrested on charges under Article 58-11 that they were participating in anti-Soviet activities and sentenced to three years of labour camp in Siblag. This was however reviewed and they were back in Moscow after six months. He became a professor in 1934 and taught zoogeography until 1950.

A major contribution was two volumes in the mammals of the Soviet Union series of publications. The taxa Capra falconeri heptneri, Meles meles heptneri, Mustela nivalis heptneri and Salpingotus heptneri are named in his honour.
