= Alfred Brazier Howell =

American zoologist

Alfred Brazier Howell (28 July 1886 – 23 December 1961) was an American zoologist, primarily a mammalogist.

A. B. Howell was born in Catonsville, Maryland, the son of Darius Carpenter Howell Sr. (1820–1887) and his second wife Katherine Elinor Hyatt Howell. A. B. Howell attended The Hill School in Pottstown, Pennsylvania for four years, graduating in 1905. He spent one year (1905–1906) at Yale University and then received no more formal academic education. In 1910 he moved to California, where he studied the birds of the Channel Islands of California and the Coronado Islands of Baja California. In 1918 he went on a collecting expedition to Arizona. In 1921 he became vice-president of the Cooper Ornithological Society. In 1922 he moved to Washington D.C. In 1923 and in 1924, he went on collecting expeditions in California.

Howell worked from 1923 to 1927 as a scientific assistant with the United States Biological Survey. From 1928 to 1943 he taught anatomy at the Department of Anatomy of Johns Hopkins School of Medicine.

In 1929, with Remington Kellogg, he organized the Council for the Conservation of Whales (also involved in the conservation of other marine mammals). Howell was vice-president from 1938 to 1942 and president from 1942 to 1944 of the American Society of Mammalogists.

He married Margaret Gray Sherk in 1914. At the Cooper Ornithological Society, A. Brazier Howell, Harry R. Painton, and Frances F. Roberts have cash awards named after them. He died in Bangor, Maine.

== Selected publications ==
- 1917: Birds of the islands off the coast of southern California (The Club, Hollywood).
- 1920: A study of the California jumping mice of the genus Zapus (Berkeley).
- 1926: A symmetry in the skulls of mammals (Washington).
- 1926: Anatomy of the wood rat (The Williams & Wilkins company, Baltimore).
- 1927: Revision of the American lemming mice (genus Synaptomys) (Washington).
- 1927: Contribution to the anatomy of the Chinese finless porpoise (Washington).
- 1929: Contribution to the comparative anatomy of the eared and earless seals (Washington).
- 1929: Mammals from China in the collections of the United States National museum (Washington).
- 1930: Aquatic mammals; their adaptations to life in the water (C. C. Thomas, Springfield et Baltimore — reprinted in 1970 Dover Publications, New York).
- 1932: The brachial flexor muscles in primates (Washington).
- 1939: Gross anatomy (D. Appleton-Century company, New York and London).
- 1944: Speed in animals; their specialization for running and leaping (University of Chicago press, Chicago — reprinted in 1965 by Hafner Pub. Co., New York).
