= Wichita Mountains pillsnail =

Conservation status
- Imperiled (NatureServe)

Scientific classification
- Kingdom: Animalia
- Phylum: Mollusca
- Class: Gastropoda
- Order: Stylommatophora
- Family: Polygyridae
- Genus: Euchemotrema
- Species: E. wichitorum

Binomial name
- Euchemotrema wichitorum (Branson, 1972)

Synonyms
- Stenotrema wichitorum Branson, 1972

Species of snail

The Wichita Mountains pillsnail (Euchemotrema wichitorum) is a species of air-breathing land snail, a terrestrial pulmonate gastropod mollusk in the family Polygyridae. The species is endemic to Oklahoma, the United States.

== Description ==
Euchemotrema wichitorum was first described in 1972 by Branley A. Branson as Stenotrema wichitorum. The shell varies from light tan to dark brown. It has an average diameter of 8.3 mm and an average height of 4.6 mm. It is the second smallest species of its genus.

== Distribution and habitat ==
It is endemic to the Wichita Mountains area in southwest Oklahoma. The type locality is located in the Wichita Mountains Wildlife Refuge. Originally only being known from two counties, it has now been located in seven counties in southwest Oklahoma. It favors oak dense woodlands rather than the granite boulder fields of the area. They have a fire association, and charred logs shelter more live snails than uncharred counterparts. High severity fires lead to high mortality, due to sheltered locations being burned. The charring of the wood converts less usable calcium oxalate into usable calcium ions and calcium carbonate, which is likely the reason for the fire association.

The Wichita Mountains Wildlife Refuge protects a large amount of the range, and the refuge's regular prescribed fires are likely beneficial to Euchemotrema wichitorum.
