= Toussaint von Charpentier =

German geologist and entomologist

Toussaint von Charpentier (22 November 1779 – 4 March 1847) was a German geologist and entomologist.

He was the author of Libellulinae europaeae descriptae e depictae (1840).

== Biography ==
Toussaint von Charpentier was born in Freiberg, Saxony ( 22 November 1779 and died in Brieg 4 March 1847. Charpentier was the son of the Saxony geologist and "Berghauptmann" (head of the mining inspectorate), Johann Friedrich William von Charpentier and the brother of Johann von Charpentier. He studied geology and mining engineering at the Bergakademie Freiberg and continued his studies at the University of Leipzig.

In the year 1802 Charpentier went to Prussia, where he accepted a place with the Silesia Oberbergamt (upper mining authority) in Breslau. Charpentier took over the management of Schweidnitz local mining authority in Schweidnitz until returning, in 1811, to the upper mining authority in Breslau.

In 1828 his transfer to Dortmund as "Vizeberghauptmann" took place. 1830 he was appointed to a post in "Oberbergamtes" Dortmund. In the year 1836 he transferred to the Silesian mining authority in the same capacity. After 1819 he was transferred to Brieg and remained there up to his death in the same office.

Charpentier published numerous writings on mountain structure and geology, in addition, to writing on his hobby, entomology. He published between 1829 and 1830 a new edition of the publications Die europäischen Schmetterlinge and Die ausländischen Schmetterlinge with Eugenius Johann Christoph Esper.

== Works ==
- Kurze Beschreibung sämtlicher beim Amalgamierwerk Halsbrücke bei Freiberg vorkommenden Arbeiten, 1802
- Übersetzung von Rinmans Allgemeindem Bergwerkslexikon, 1808
- Darstellung der Höhe verschiedener Berge, Flüsse und Orte Schlesiens, 1812
- Bemerkungen auf einer Reise von Breslau uber Salzburg, durch Tyrol, die sudliche Schweig nach Rom, Neapel und Paestum im Jahre 1818. Erster Theil. 1820.
- Bemerkungen auf einer Reise von Breslau uber Salzburg, durch Tyrol, die sudliche Schweig nach Rom, Neapel und Paestum im Jahre 1818. Zweiter Theil. 1820.
- Über Gletscher, 1819
- Bemerkungen auf einer Reise von Breslau über Salzburg, Tirol und der südlichen Schweiz nach Rom, Neapel und Paestum Bd. 1–2, 1820
- Horae Entomologicae, 1825
- Libellulinae Europaeae, 1840
- Orthopterae, Heft 1-10, 1841–1843
