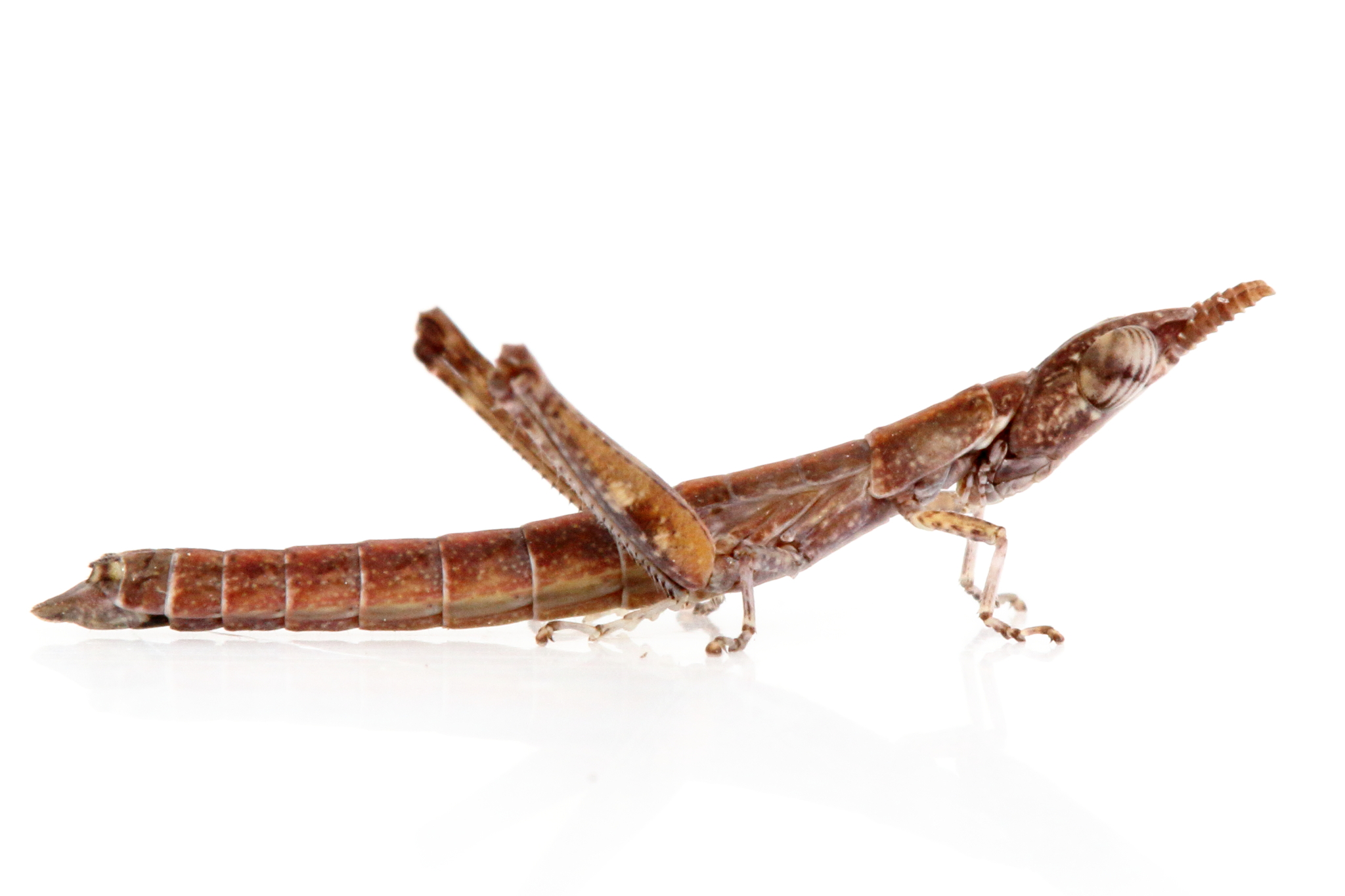
- Micromeeka minuta

Scientific classification
- Domain: Eukaryota
- Kingdom: Animalia
- Phylum: Arthropoda
- Class: Insecta
- Order: Orthoptera
- Suborder: Caelifera
- Family: Morabidae
- Subfamily: Morabinae; Rehn, 1948

= Morabinae =

Subfamily of grasshoppers

Morabinae, also known as matchstick grasshoppers, is a subfamily of grasshoppers that are wholly endemic to Australia. Around 240 species of the subfamily Morabinae are known to exist.

== Genera ==
The following 41 genera are recognised in the subfamily Morabinae:

Tribe Callitalini

- Bundinja Key, 1976
- Callita Key, 1976
- Callitala Sjöstedt, 1921
- Carnarvonella Key, 1976
- Furculifera Key, 1976
- Malleolopha Key, 1976
- Micromeeka Key, 1976
- Moritala Key, 1976
- Prorifera Key, 1976
- Sicula Key, 1976

Tribe Capsigerini

- Aliena Key, 1976
- Amangu Key, 1976
- Aruntina Key, 1976
- Capsigera Key, 1976
- Crois Key, 1976
- Namatjira Key, 1976
- Proscopiomima Key, 1976
- Swanea Key, 1976

Tribe Keyacridini

- Achuraba Key, 1976
- Achurimima Key, 1976
- Alatiplica Key, 1976
- Baruca Key, 1976
- Chinnicka Key, 1976
- Flindersella Key, 1976
- Heide Key, 1976
- Keyacris Rehn, 1952
- Vandiemenella Key, 1976
- Whiteacris Key, 1976

Tribe Morabini

- Drysdalopila Key, 1977
- Filoraba Key, 1976
- Moraba Walker, 1870
- Spectriforma Key, 1976

Tribe Warramungini

- Callimunga Key, 1976
- Culmacris Key, 1976
- Geckomima Key, 1976
- Georgina Key, 1976
- Hastella Key, 1976
- Nanihospita Key, 1976
- Stiletta Key, 1976
- Warramaba Key, 1976
- Warramunga Rehn, 1952
