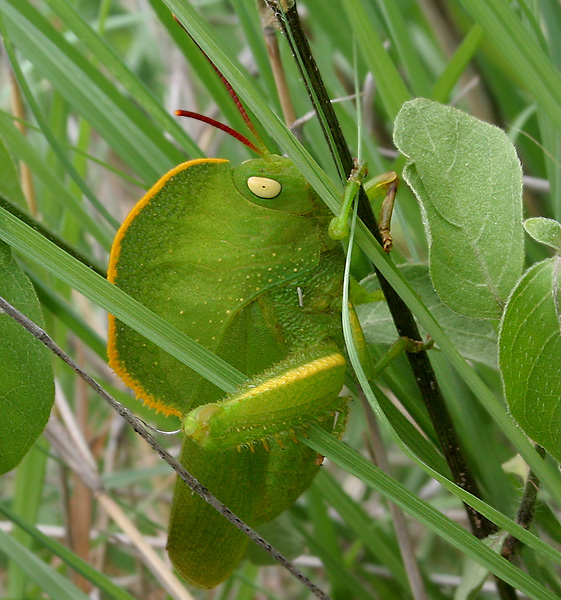
- Teratodes monticollis (Acrididae)

Scientific classification
- Domain: Eukaryota
- Kingdom: Animalia
- Phylum: Arthropoda
- Class: Insecta
- Order: Orthoptera
- Suborder: Caelifera
- Infraorder: Acrididea; MacLeay, 1821

Superfamily group and superfamily
- Acridomorpha; Tetrigoidea

= Acrididea =

Infraorder of grasshoppers

Acrididea including the Acridomorpha is an infraorder of insects that describe the grasshoppers (thus also locusts) and ground-hoppers. It contains a large majority of species in the suborder Caelifera and the taxon Acridomorpha may also be used, which excludes the Tetrigoidea. Both names are derived from older texts, such as Imms, which placed the "short-horned grasshoppers" and locusts at the family level (Acrididae). The study of grasshopper species is called acridology.

== Acridomorpha ==
The Orthoptera Species File lists the following superfamilies: most families and species belong to the Acridoidea.

- Acridoidea (MacLeay, 1821)
- Eumastacoidea Burr, 1899
  - Chorotypidae Stål, 1873
  - Episactidae Burr, 1899
  - Eumastacidae Burr, 1899
  - Euschmidtiidae Rehn, 1948
  - Mastacideidae Rehn, 1948
  - Morabidae Rehn, 1948
  - †Promastacidae Kevan & Wighton, 1981
  - Thericleidae Burr, 1899
- †Locustopsoidea Handlirsch, 1906
  - †Bouretidae Martins-Neto, 2001
  - †Eolocustopsidae Riek, 1976
  - †Locustavidae Sharov, 1968
  - †Locustopsidae Handlirsch, 1906
- Pneumoroidea Thunberg, 1810 — monotypic
- Proscopioidea Serville, 1838 — monotypic
- Pyrgomorphoidea Brunner von Wattenwyl, 1874 — monotypic
- Tanaoceroidea Rehn, 1948 — monotypic
- Trigonopterygoidea Walker, 1870
  - Trigonopterygidae Walker, 1870
  - Xyronotidae Bolívar, 1909
