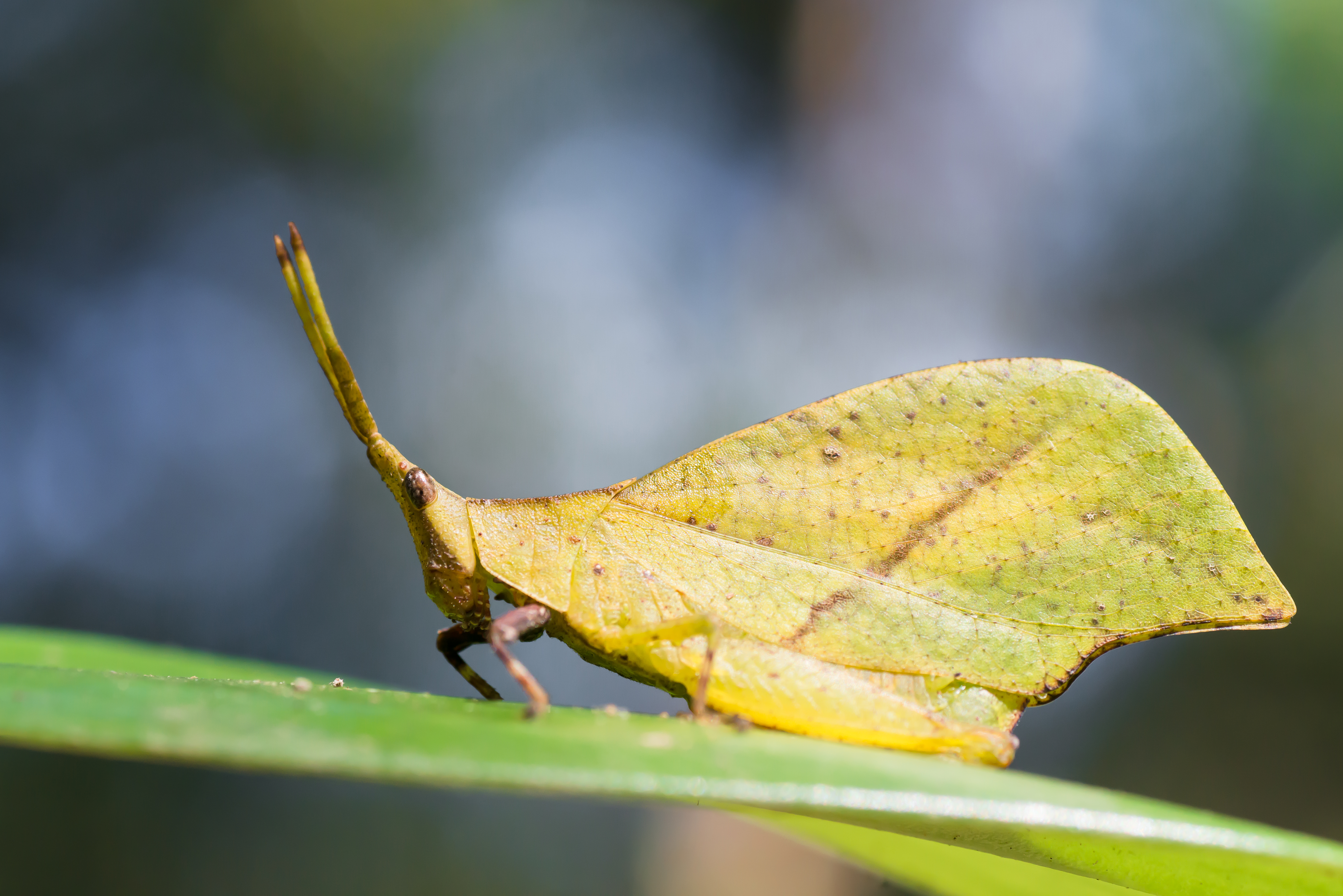
- Systella dusmeti

Scientific classification
- Domain: Eukaryota
- Kingdom: Animalia
- Phylum: Arthropoda
- Class: Insecta
- Order: Orthoptera
- Suborder: Caelifera
- Informal group: Acridomorpha
- Superfamily: Trigonopterygoidea
- Family: Trigonopterygidae
- Genus: Systella; Westwood, 1841

Synonyms
- Gyrtone Stål, 1875

= Systella =

Genus of grasshoppers

Systella is an Asian genus of grasshoppers in the family Trigonopterygidae. Species can be found from subcontinental India, through Indo-China and Malesia to New Guinea.

== Species ==
The Orthoptera Species file lists:

- Systella annandalei Bolívar, 1905
- Systella bolivari Willemse, 1928
- Systella borneensis Willemse, 1930
- Systella dusmeti Bolívar, 1905
- Systella gestroi Bolívar, 1905
- Systella philippensis Walker, 1870
- Systella platyptera Haan, 1842
- Systella rafflesii Westwood, 1841 - type species (location Sumatra)
- Systella sarawakensis Willemse, 1930

== Gallery ==
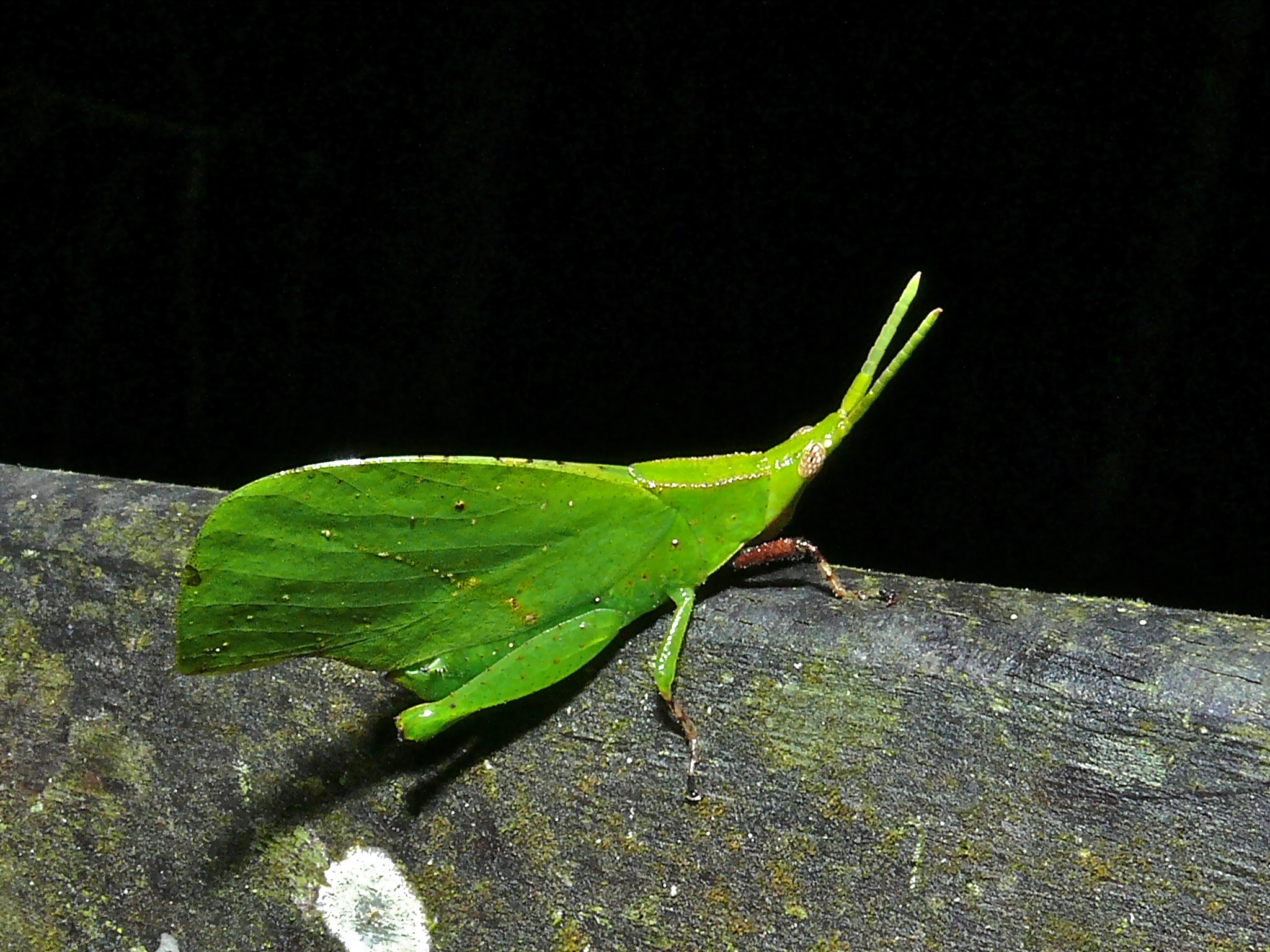
Systella sp. from Gunung Mulu NP Sarawak

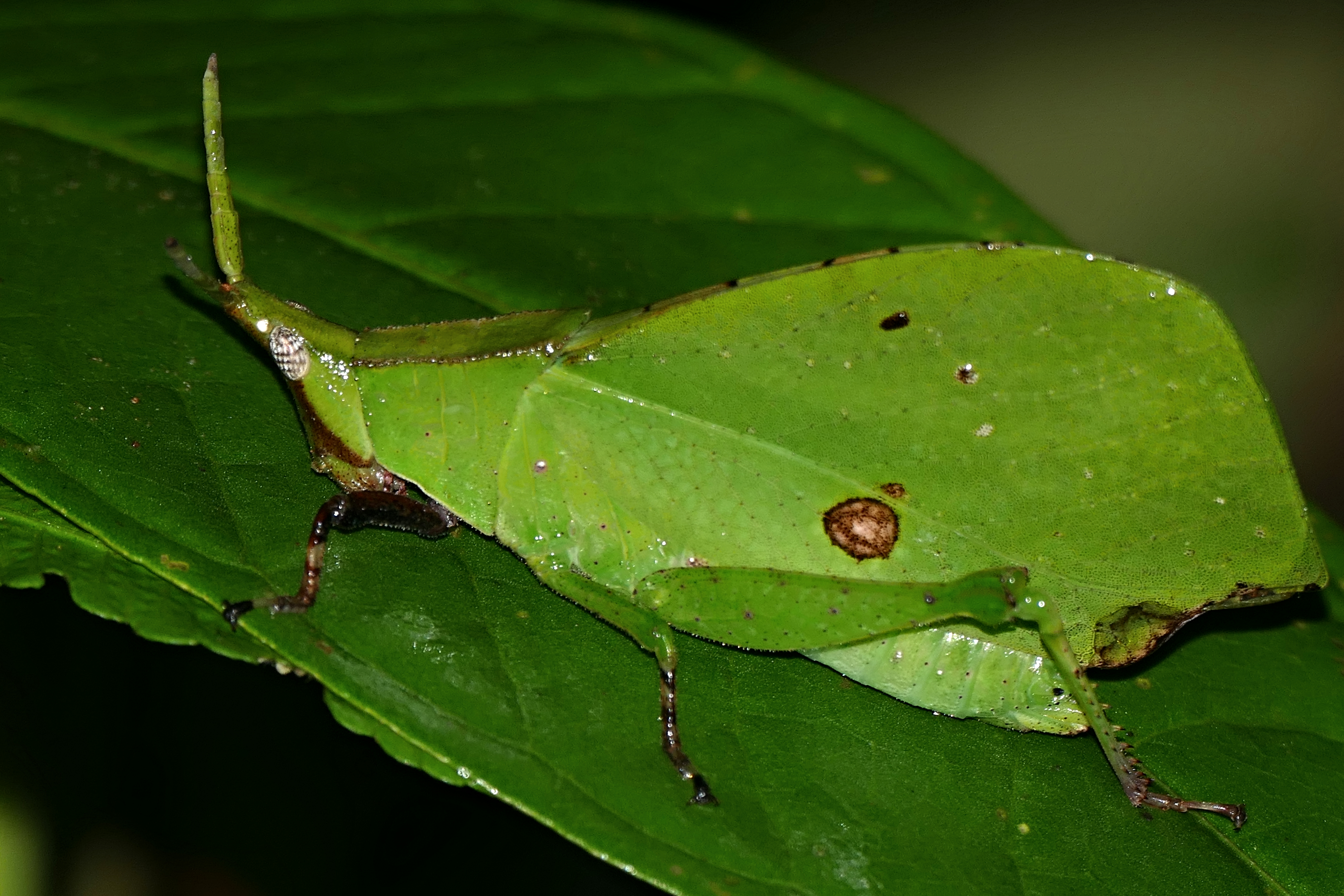
Systella sp. from Gunung Mulu NP Sarawak

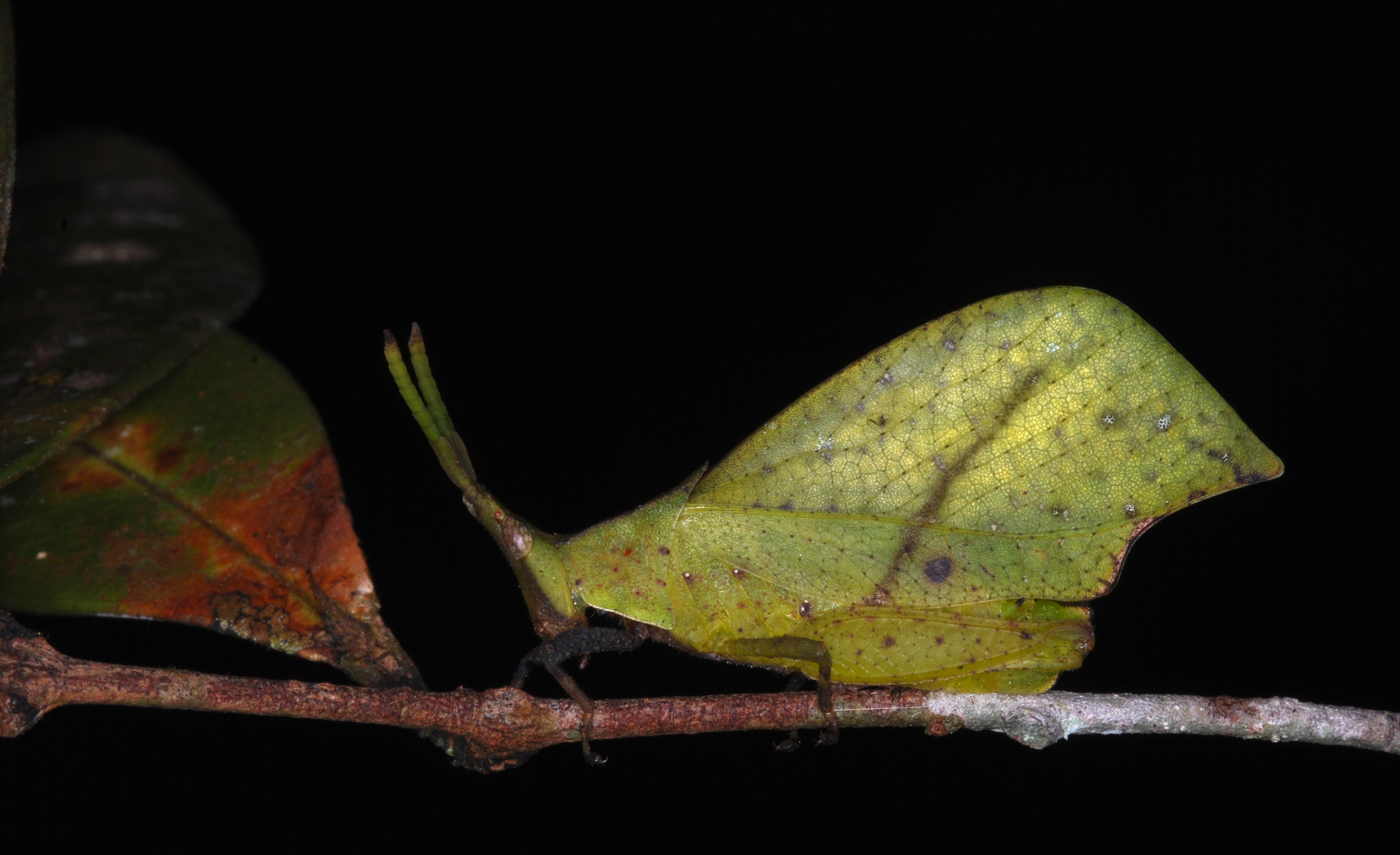
leaf grasshopper from Tapah Hills, Perak
