= Locustopsis reducta =

Locustopsis reducta Temporal range: Pliensbachian–Toarcian

Scientific classification
- Domain: Eukaryota
- Kingdom: Animalia
- Phylum: Arthropoda
- Class: Insecta
- Order: Orthoptera
- Suborder: Caelifera
- Family: †Locustopsidae
- Genus: †Locustopsis
- Species: †L. reducta

Binomial name
- †Locustopsis reducta Handlirsch, 1939

Extinct species of grasshopper

Locustopsis reducta is an extinct species of grasshopper in the family Locustopsidae, with fossils found in Germany.
