= Xeniinae =

Scientific classification
- Kingdom: Animalia
- Phylum: Arthropoda
- Class: Insecta
- Order: Orthoptera
- Suborder: Caelifera
- Infraorder: Acrididea
- Nanorder: Acridomorpha
- Superfamily: Proscopioidea
- Family: Proscopiidae
- Subfamily: Xeniinae; Liana, 1980

Subfamily of grasshoppers

Xeniinae is a subfamily of grasshoppers in the family Proscopiidae. Xeniinae has 3 genera, 2 extant and 1 extinct, and about 16 described species, found in South America.

== Genera ==
These three genera belong to the subfamily Xeniinae:

- Altograciosa - monotypic A. mirabilis Liana, 1980
- Astroma Charpentier, 1845
- Xenium - monotypic X. saburrae Liana, 1980
