= Trigonopteryx =

Scientific classification
- Domain: Eukaryota
- Kingdom: Animalia
- Phylum: Arthropoda
- Class: Insecta
- Order: Orthoptera
- Suborder: Caelifera
- Informal group: Acridomorpha
- Superfamily: Trigonopterygoidea
- Family: Trigonopterygidae
- Genus: Trigonopteryx; Charpentier, 1841

Genus of grasshoppers

External image
- Images at iNaturalist

Trigonopteryx is a genus of Asian grasshoppers: typical of the family Trigonopterygidae.

== Subgenera and Species ==
The Orthoptera Species file lists two subgenera:

subgenus Celebopteryx Ramme, 1941

- Trigonopteryx celebesia Willemse, 1931
- Trigonopteryx willemsei Ramme, 1941

subgenus Trigonopteryx Charpentier, 1845

- Trigonopteryx hopei Westwood, 1841
- Trigonopteryx punctata Charpentier, 1841 - type species (locality Java)
- Trigonopteryx sumatrana Willemse, 1930
