= Hybusa =

Scientific classification
- Domain: Eukaryota
- Kingdom: Animalia
- Phylum: Arthropoda
- Class: Insecta
- Order: Orthoptera
- Suborder: Caelifera
- Family: Proscopiidae
- Subfamily: Hybusinae; Liana, 1980
- Genus: Hybusa; Erichson, 1844

Genus of grasshoppers

Hybusa is a genus of neotropical stick-mimicking grasshoppers, the only genus in the subfamily Hybusinae. They are herbivorous.

== Species ==
As of 2018, species include:

- Hybusa armaticollis (Blanchard, 1851)
- Hybusa coniceps (Blanchard, 1851)
- Hybusa minuta Mello-Leitão, 1939
- Hybusa occidentalis (Westwood, 1843)
