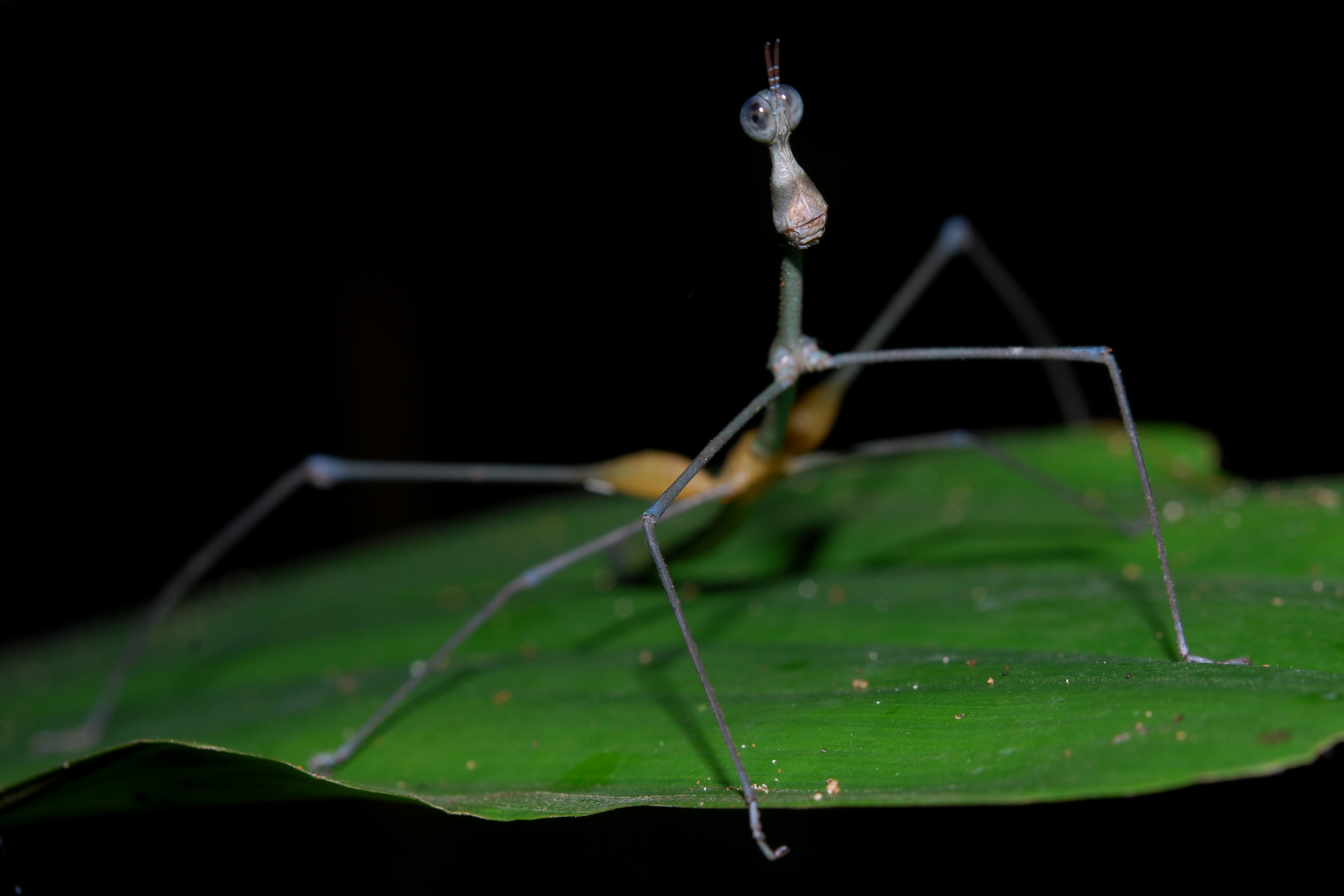
- Proscopia sp.

Scientific classification
- Kingdom: Animalia
- Phylum: Arthropoda
- Class: Insecta
- Order: Orthoptera
- Suborder: Caelifera
- Family: Proscopiidae
- Subfamily: Proscopiinae; Serville, 1838

Tribes
- Proscopiini Serville, 1838; Tetanorhynchini Bentos-Pereira, 2003

= Proscopiinae =

Subfamily of grasshoppers

Proscopiinae is a subfamily of grasshoppers in the family Proscopiidae. There are more than 20 genera and 190 described species, found in South America.

== Tribes and genera ==
Two tribes have been identified, with the following genera assigned to the subfamily Proscopiinae:

=== Proscopiini ===
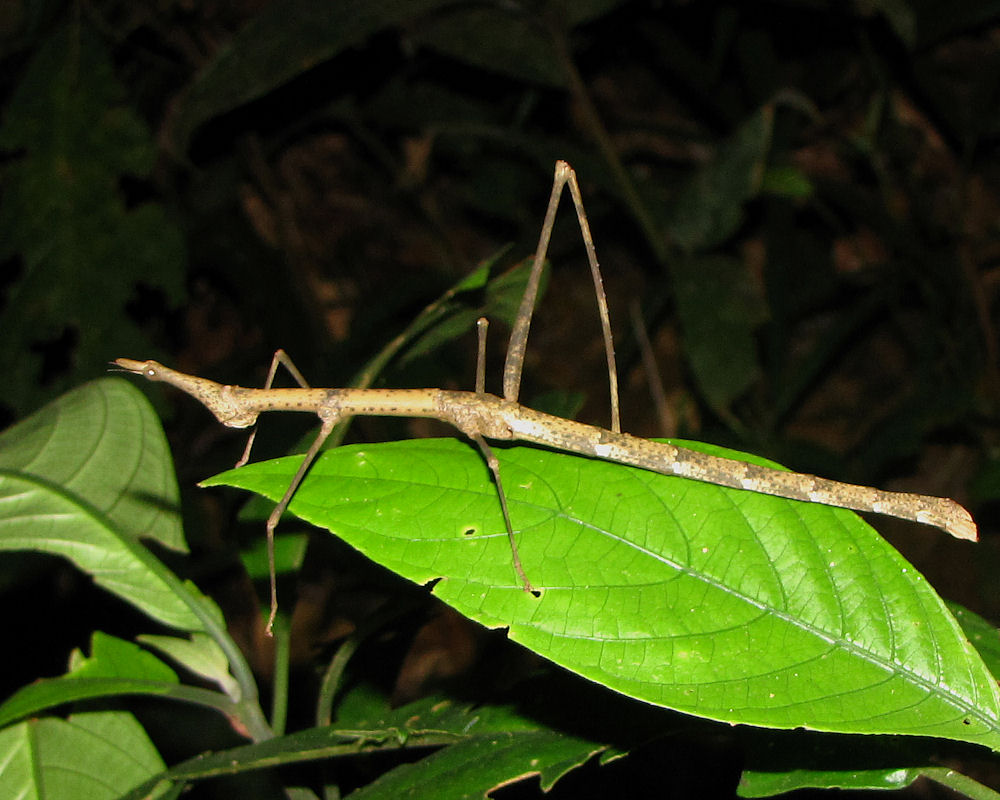
Pseudoproscopia scabra

1. Albascopia Cadena-Castañeda & Cardona, 2015
2. Apioscelis Brunner von Wattenwyl, 1890
3. Carbonellis Bentos-Pereira, 2006
4. Milenascopia Queiroz & Rafael, 2019
5. Paraproscopia Bentos-Pereira, 2006
6. Prosarthria Brunner von Wattenwyl, 1890
7. Proscopia Klug, 1820
8. Pseudoproscopia Bentos-Pereira, 2006
9. Rowellscopia Cadena-Castañeda, 2025

=== Tetanorhynchini ===
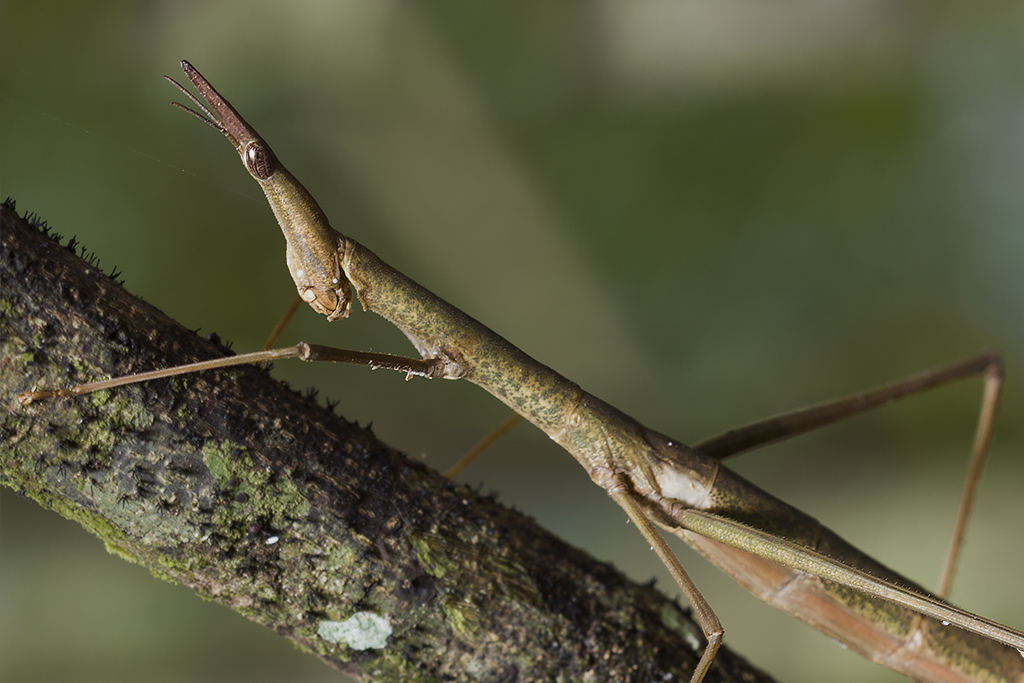
Tetanorhynchus punctatus

- Cephalocoema Serville, 1838
- Mariascopia Bentos-Pereira, 2003
- Orienscopia Bentos-Pereira, 2000
- Pseudastroma Jago, 1990
- Scleratoscopia Jago, 1990
- Tetanorhynchus Brunner von Wattenwyl, 1890
- Wattenwylscopia Cadena-Castañeda & Cardona, 2015

=== Tribe not determined ===
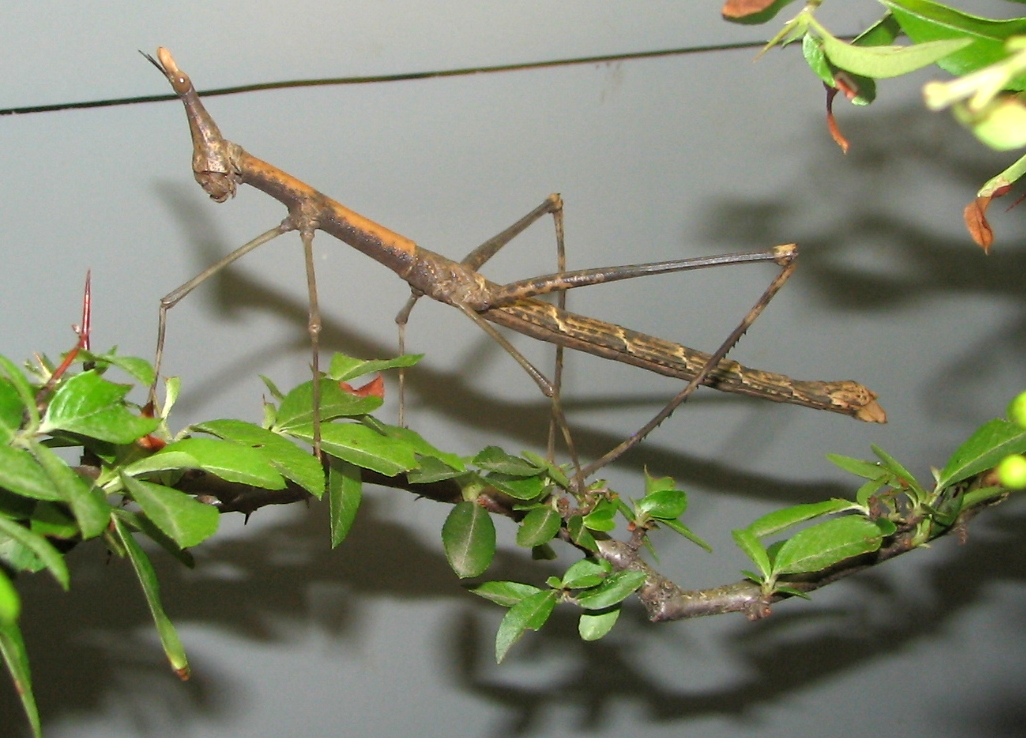
Stiphra sp., giant jumping stick

- Anchocoema Mello-Leitão, 1939
- Anchotatus Brunner von Wattenwyl, 1890
- Astromoides Tapia, 1981
- Callangania Liana, 1980
- Carphoproscopia Jago, 1990
- Corynorhynchus Brunner von Wattenwyl, 1890
- Epigrypa Brunner von Wattenwyl, 1890
- Microcoema Jago, 1990
- Pseudoanchotatus Liana, 1980
- Stiphra Brunner von Wattenwyl, 1890
