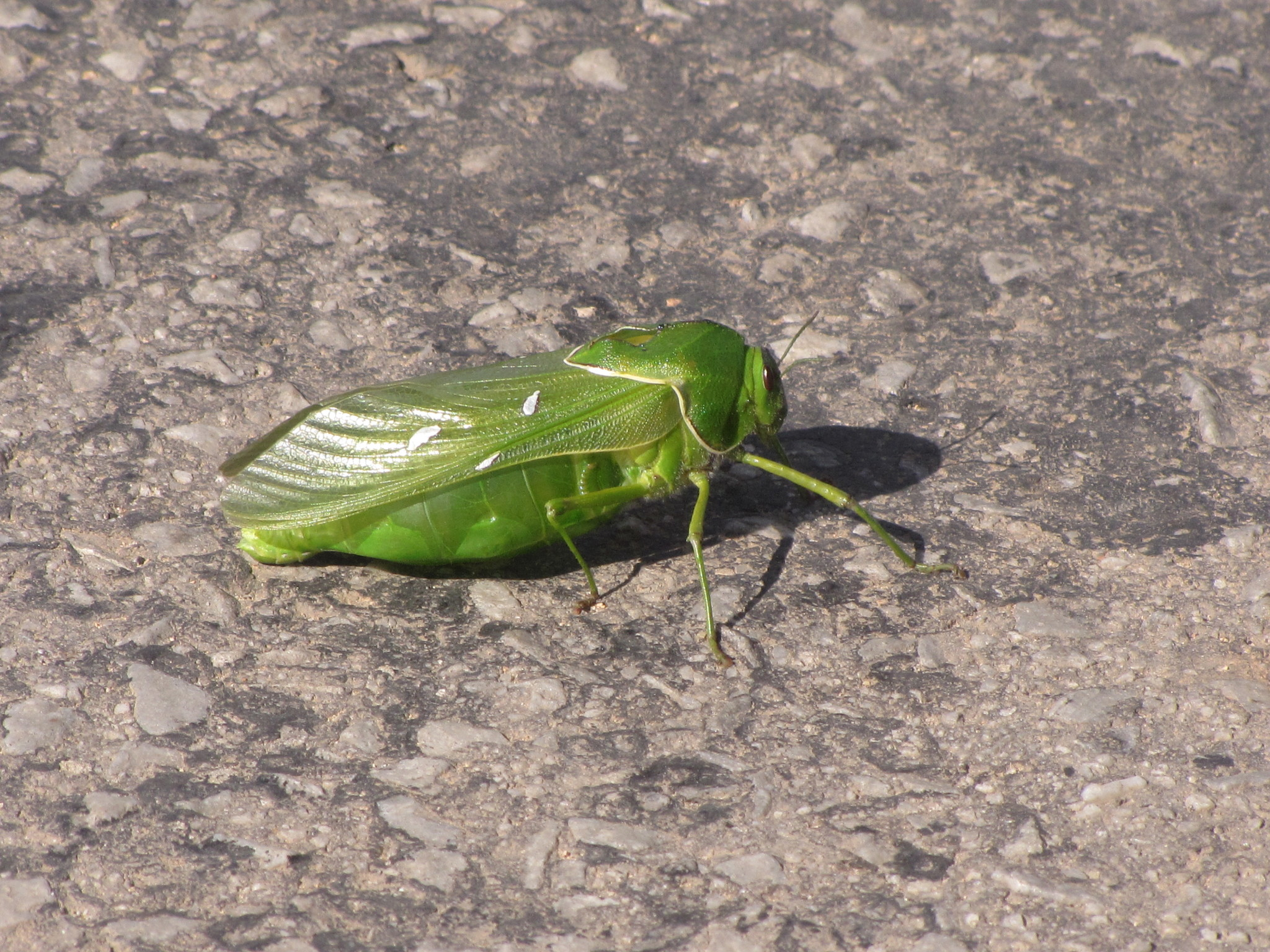

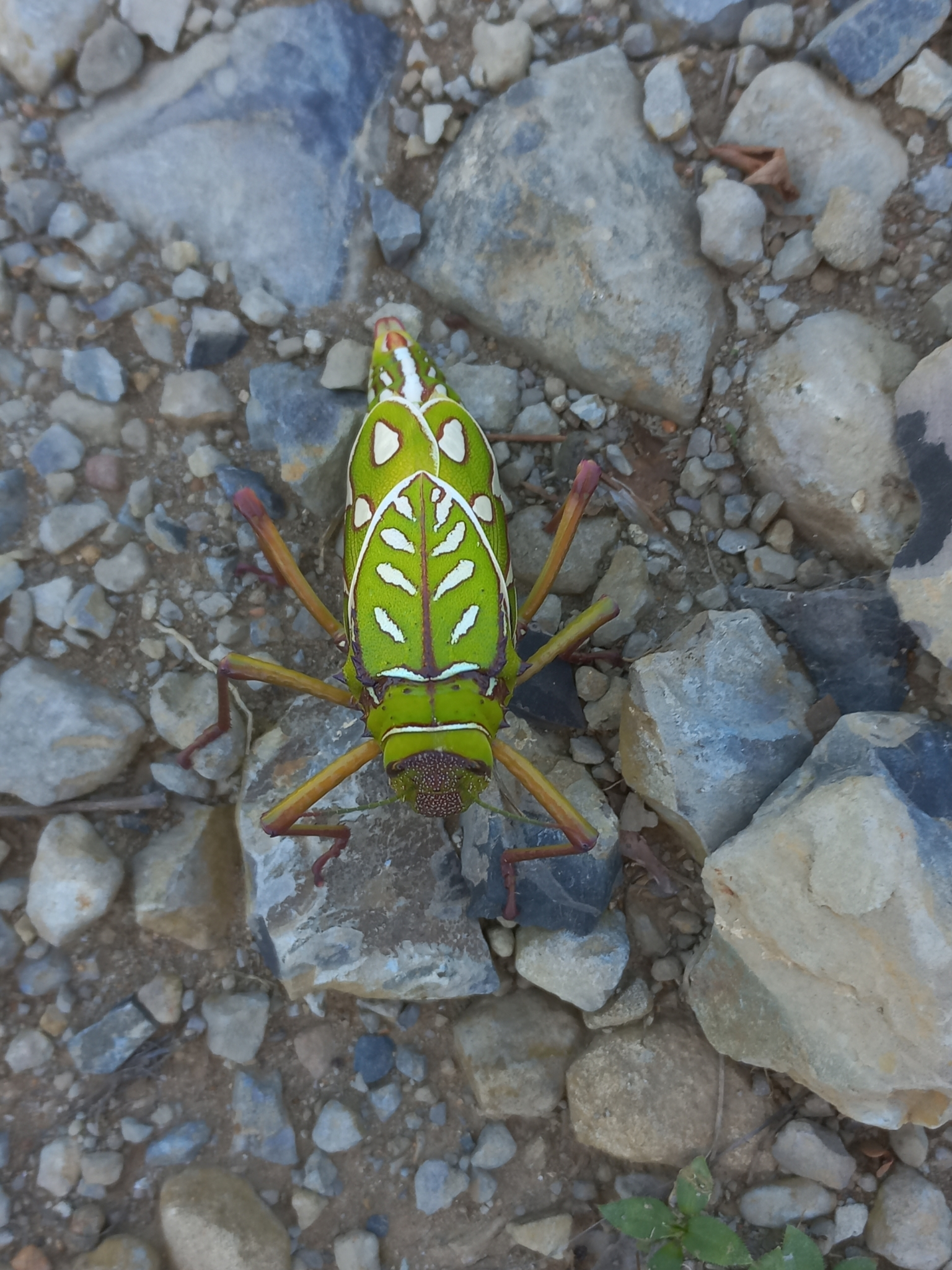

Conservation status
- Near Threatened (IUCN 3.1)

Scientific classification
- Kingdom: Animalia
- Phylum: Arthropoda
- Class: Insecta
- Order: Orthoptera
- Suborder: Caelifera
- Family: Pneumoridae
- Genus: Pneumora; Thunberg, 1775
- Species: P. inanis

Binomial name
- Pneumora inanis (Fabricius, 1775)
- Pneumora inanis is found in the Eastern Cape and KZN. There is an isolated population in Lukuledi, Tanzania. Extant (resident)

Synonyms
- Cystocoelia inanis (Fabricius, 1775); Gryllus inanis Fabricius 1775; Pneumora scutellaris Latreille, 1829; Pneumora sexguttata Thunberg, 1775

= Pneumora =

South African grasshopper species

Pneumora inanis, the Khonia bladderhopper, is a species in the family Pneumoridae endemic to the coastal forest regions of the Eastern Cape and KwaZulu-Natal provinces of South Africa. It is the only species in the genus Pneumora.

== Distribution ==
Pneumora inanis is found in patchy forested areas along the coast between Port Elizabeth and Mtunzini. There is a single record from Tanzania.

== Conservation status ==
Pneumora inanis has been assessed as Near Threatened due to the threats of deforestation, the decline of mature individuals, the population being severely fragmented, and its small area of occupancy.

== Ecology ==
Pneumora inanis is found in coastal forests on Leucosidea sericea and Searsia pentheri.
