= Sicula gracilior =

Scientific classification
- Kingdom: Animalia
- Phylum: Arthropoda
- Clade: Pancrustacea
- Class: Insecta
- Order: Orthoptera
- Suborder: Caelifera
- Family: Morabidae
- Tribe: Callitalini
- Genus: Sicula; Key, 1976
- Species: S. gracilior

Binomial name
- Sicula gracilior Key, 1976

Species of grasshopper

Sicula is a genus of grasshoppers in the family Morabidae. The genus has one described species, Sicula gracilior, found in Australia.
