= Tanaocerus koebelei =

Scientific classification
- Domain: Eukaryota
- Kingdom: Animalia
- Phylum: Arthropoda
- Class: Insecta
- Order: Orthoptera
- Suborder: Caelifera
- Family: Tanaoceridae
- Genus: Tanaocerus
- Species: T. koebelei

Binomial name
- Tanaocerus koebelei Bruner, 1906

Species of grasshopper

Tanaocerus koebelei, or Koebele's desert long-horned grasshopper, is a species of desert long-horned grasshopper in the family Tanaoceridae. It is found in North America.
