= Bouretidae =

Bouretidae Temporal range: Aptian–Albian

Scientific classification
- Domain: Eukaryota
- Kingdom: Animalia
- Phylum: Arthropoda
- Class: Insecta
- Order: Orthoptera
- Suborder: Caelifera
- Infraorder: Acrididea
- Superfamily: †Locustopsoidea
- Family: †Bouretidae; Martins-Neto, 2001

Extinct family of grasshoppers

Bouretidae is an extinct family of grasshoppers in the order Orthoptera. There is one genus, Bouretia, in Bouretidae, with fossils found in Brazil.
