= Xyronotidae =

Scientific classification
- Kingdom: Animalia
- Phylum: Arthropoda
- Class: Insecta
- Order: Orthoptera
- Suborder: Caelifera
- Infraorder: Acrididea
- Nanorder: Acridomorpha
- Superfamily: Trigonopterygoidea
- Family: Xyronotidae; Bolívar, 1909

Family of grasshoppers

Xyronotidae is a family of Central American grasshoppers in the order Orthoptera. There are at least two genera and four described species in Xyronotidae.

== Genera ==
These two genera belong to the family Xyronotidae:

- Axyronotus Dirsh & Mason, 1979
- Xyronotus Saussure, 1884
