= Locustopsis =

Locustopsis Temporal range: Pliensbachian–Toarcian

Scientific classification
- Domain: Eukaryota
- Kingdom: Animalia
- Phylum: Arthropoda
- Class: Insecta
- Order: Orthoptera
- Suborder: Caelifera
- Family: †Locustopsidae
- Subfamily: †Locustopsinae
- Genus: †Locustopsis; Handlirsch 1906

Species
- See text

Extinct genus of grasshopper

Locustopsis is an extinct genus of grasshopper in the family Locustopsidae.

The Paleobiology Database lists the following species as accepted within Locustopsis:

- Locustopsis africanus
- Locustopsis anatolica
- Locustopsis apicalis
- Locustopsis bernstorffi
- Locustopsis bucklandi
- Locustopsis cockerelli
- Locustopsis constricta
- Locustopsis cubitalis
- Locustopsis dubia
- Locustopsis elegans
- Locustopsis elongata
- Locustopsis ferghanensis
- Locustopsis germari
- Locustopsis gracilis
- Locustopsis gyra
- Locustopsis karatavica
- Locustopsis lacera
- Locustopsis lacoei
- Locustopsis latipennis
- Locustopsis maculosa
- Locustopsis mecklenburgica
- Locustopsis nana
- Locustopsis picta
- Locustopsis posterior
- Locustopsis procera
- Locustopsis pulchella
- Locustopsis reducta
- Locustopsis rhytofemoralis
- Locustopsis shurabica
- Locustopsis sippeli
- Locustopsis spectabilis
- Locustopsis uvarovi
