= Tanaocerus =

Scientific classification
- Domain: Eukaryota
- Kingdom: Animalia
- Phylum: Arthropoda
- Class: Insecta
- Order: Orthoptera
- Suborder: Caelifera
- Family: Tanaoceridae
- Genus: Tanaocerus; Bruner, 1906

Genus of grasshoppers

Tanaocerus is a genus of desert long-horned grasshoppers in the family Tanaoceridae. There are at least two described species in Tanaocerus.

== Species ==
These two species belong to the genus Tanaocerus:

- Tanaocerus koebelei Bruner, 1906 (Koebele's desert long-horned grasshopper)
- Tanaocerus rugosus Hebard, 1931
