= Spectriforma =

Scientific classification
- Domain: Eukaryota
- Kingdom: Animalia
- Phylum: Arthropoda
- Class: Insecta
- Order: Orthoptera
- Suborder: Caelifera
- Family: Morabidae
- Subfamily: Morabinae
- Tribe: Morabini
- Genus: Spectriforma; Key, 1976

Species
- Spectriforma bifurcata Key, 1976; Spectriforma gracilicollis (Sjöstedt, 1921); Spectriforma spinulifera Key, 1977; Spectriforma transversa Key, 1977

Genus of grasshoppers

Spectriforma is a genus of grasshoppers in the family Morabidae. It is mostly found in northern Australian savannahs.
