= Warramunga desertorum =

Scientific classification
- Domain: Eukaryota
- Kingdom: Animalia
- Phylum: Arthropoda
- Class: Insecta
- Order: Orthoptera
- Suborder: Caelifera
- Family: Morabidae
- Tribe: Warramungini
- Genus: Warramunga; Rehn, 1952
- Species: W. desertorum

Binomial name
- Warramunga desertorum Rehn, 1952

Species of grasshopper

Warramunga is a genus of grasshoppers in the family Morabidae. There is one described species in Warramunga, Warramunga desertorum, found in Australia.
