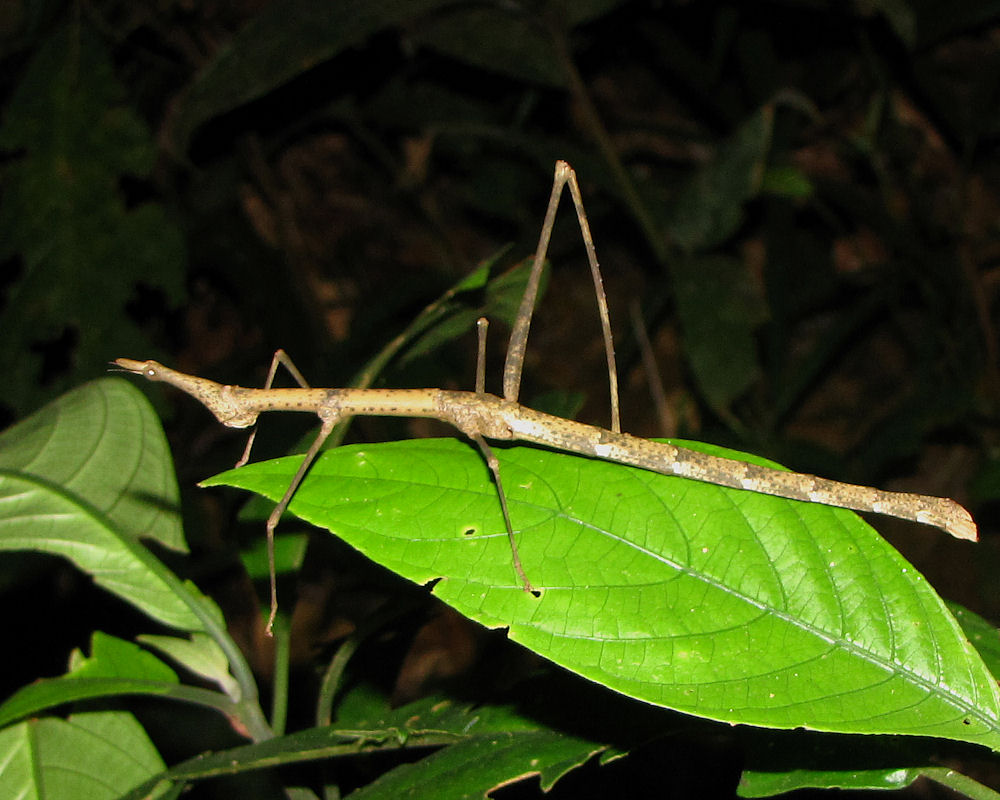
- Horsehead grasshopper, Tambopata National Reserve, Peru

Scientific classification
- Kingdom: Animalia
- Phylum: Arthropoda
- Class: Insecta
- Order: Orthoptera
- Suborder: Caelifera
- Family: Proscopiidae
- Subfamily: Proscopiinae
- Tribe: Proscopiini
- Genus: Pseudoproscopia
- Species: P. scabra

Binomial name
- Pseudoproscopia scabra (Klug, 1820)

Synonyms
- Proscopia rostrata Klug, 1820; Proscopia scabra Klug, 1820; Proscopia parallela Walker, 1870

= Pseudoproscopia scabra =

Species of grasshopper

Pseudoproscopia scabra, commonly known as the horsehead grasshopper, is the type species in its genus of neotropical "stick grasshoppers": in the subfamily Proscopiinae. It is found in South America in Brazil, Colombia, French Guiana, Venezuela and Peru.
