= Mohavacris =

Scientific classification
- Kingdom: Animalia
- Phylum: Arthropoda
- Clade: Pancrustacea
- Class: Insecta
- Order: Orthoptera
- Suborder: Caelifera
- Family: Tanaoceridae
- Genus: Mohavacris; Rehn, 1948
- Species: M. timberlakei

Binomial name
- Mohavacris timberlakei Rehn, 1948

Genus of grasshoppers

Mohavacris is a genus of desert long-horned grasshoppers in the family Tanaoceridae. There is one described species in Mohavacris, M. timberlakei.
