= Namatjira =

Namatjira may refer to:

== People ==
- Albert Namatjira (1902–1959), Australian artist
- Elaine Namatjira, former leading artist at the Hermannsburg Potters, granddaughter of Albert
- Vincent Namatjira (born 1983), Australian artist, great-grandson of Albert

== Other uses ==
- 13298 Namatjira, a main-belt asteroid discovered in 1998
- Electoral division of Namatjira, an electorate in the Northern Territory of Australia
- Namatjira, a theatrical production by Big hART, part of the Namatjira Project
- Namatjira (grasshopper), a genus of grasshoppers in the family Morabidae

== See also ==
- Namatjira the Painter, a 1947 documentary film
