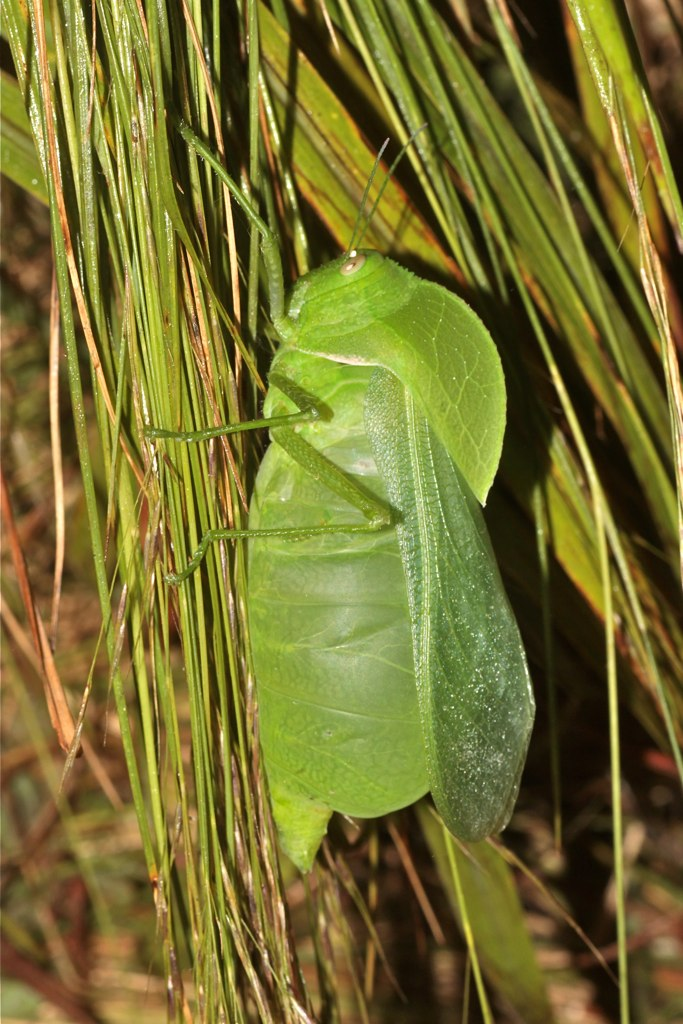
- Pneumora sp.

Scientific classification
- Kingdom: Animalia
- Phylum: Arthropoda
- Clade: Pancrustacea
- Class: Insecta
- Order: Orthoptera
- Suborder: Caelifera
- Infraorder: Acrididea
- Nanorder: Acridomorpha
- Superfamily: Pneumoroidea; Blanchard, 1845
- Family: Pneumoridae; Blanchard, 1845

Genera
- see text

= Pneumoridae =

Family of grasshoppers

The Pneumoridae are a family of nocturnal short-horned grasshoppers in the order Orthoptera, commonly known as the bladder grasshoppers and the sole representative of the superfamily Pneumoroidea. Their centre of diversity is in southern Africa, but one species occurs as far north as South Sudan. Most adult males acquire an inflated abdomen, a specialization for amplified sound production, which is likely its primary function. Most genera display striking sexual dimorphism, and several species exhibit a dual male phenotype.

== Description ==
They are nocturnal, specialized herbivores which (with few exceptions) are endemic to coastal regions of southern Africa. The smallest species is Pneumoracris browni occurring in the Succulent Karoo ecoregion, while the largest is the wide-ranging Afromontane forest species, Physophorina livingstoni.

lateral ocelli relative to antennal bases	genus
above and slightly internally	Bullacris and related genera
intermediate position	Prostallia
above and slightly externally	Physophorina and Pneumora

=== Sexual dimorphism ===
The body length of adult males vary from 11.5 to 68.0 mm, and that of females from 22.0 to 107 mm. Males of a particular species may or may not have an inflated body with fully developed wings, or both morphs may be present. Males have large ocelli, a prominently crested pronotum, and are smaller in size. Females' bodies are larger and not inflated, and possess only reduced elytra and wings. Female ocelli are vestigial and the pronotum is more tectiform, while the sound-producing mechanism is entirely different.

=== Males ===
Adult males of most species acquire an inflated, bladder-like abdomen at the final molt. Their abdominal segments consist of a thin, semitransparent integument, and are enlarged in length and width, while the intersegmental membranes are much reduced. Males are capable of producing loud calls, a long and very deep rasping noise, which members of their species can detect from 2 km away. Males call by stridulating the rasp on the inner surface of their rather weak hind femur against an opposing rasp on the third tergite of the inflated, hollow abdomen. These sclerotized abdominal ridges form a crescent-like row, and their exact number has some value in distinguishing between taxa. In species without an inflated body, these characters are only vestigial. The wings of males have a primitive morphology, and are not suited to producing sound. Their wing venation is in fact the simplest of all the Acridoidea.

=== Females ===
Females reply by duetting. They employ a different sound mechanism to produce a distinguishable call, sometimes described as a high squeak, and perhaps only partially audible to humans. This is perhaps produced by rubbing strong wing veinlets armed with strong teeth against the abdomen, which is facilitated or accompanied by raising the pronotum at a high angle.

== Ecology ==
Within one species, a primary (plesiomorph) and alternative (apomorph) male form with differing mating strategies can arise. Details of these morphs were the basis for the description of two subfamilies, namely Pneumorinae (Dirsh 1975) and Parabullacrinae (Dirsh 1975). Three groups are distinguishable on the basis of their ecology, namely a forest, marginal, and desert group, of which the forest species are the most primitive.

== Genera and species ==
List of genera and species:

Genus Bullacris Roberts, 1941

- B. boschimana (Péringuey)

Range: Northern Cape

- B. discolor (Thunberg)

Range: Western Cape and Eastern Cape, Habitat: Fynbos
Phenotype: Inflated and uninflated males

- B. intermedia (Péringuey)

Range: Eastern Cape and KwaZulu-Natal

- B. membracoides (Walker)

Range: Eastern Cape, KwaZulu-Natal and Malawi, Habitat: Savanna
Phenotype: Inflated and uninflated males

- B. obliqua (Thunberg)

Range: Western Cape, Habitat: Fynbos
Phenotype: Inflated and uninflated males

- B. serrata (Thunberg)

Range: Western Cape and Eastern Cape

- B. unicolor (Linnaeus)

Range: Cape provinces, Habitat: Succulent Karoo
Phenotype: Only inflated males

Genus Parabullacris Dirsh, 1963

- P. vansoni Disrch

Range: Northern Cape, Habitat: Succulent Karoo
Phenotype: Only uninflated males

Genus Physemacris Roberts, 1941

- P. papilosus (Fabricius)

Range: Western Cape

- P. variolosus (Linnaeus)

Range: Western Cape, Habitat: Fynbos
Phenotype: Only inflated males

Genus Paraphysemacris Dirsh, 1963

- P. spinosus Dirsh

Range: Cape provinces, Habitat: Fynbos
Phenotype: Only uninflated males

Genus Peringueyiacris Dirsh, 1965

- P. namaqua (Péringuey)

Range: Northern Cape, Habitat: Succulent Karoo
Phenotype: Only inflated males

Genus Pneumoracris Dirsh, 1963

- P. browni Dirsh

Range: Northern Cape, Habitat: Succulent Karoo
Phenotype: Only uninflated males

Genus Prostallia Bolivar, 1906

- P. granulata (Stål)

Range: KwaZulu-Natal and Mpumalanga

Genus Physophorina Westwood, 1874

- P. livingstoni Westwood

Range: South Africa, Mozambique, Malawi, Tanzania, Uganda and South Sudan, Habitat: Forest
Phenotype: Only inflated males

- P. miranda (Péringuey)

Range: South Africa and Tanzania, Habitat: Forest
Phenotype: Only inflated males

Genus Pneumora Thunberg, 1775

- P. inanis (Fabricius)

Range: South Africa and Tanzania, Habitat: Forest
Phenotype: Only inflated males
