= Locustopsidae =

Locustopsidae Temporal range: Rhaetian–Turonian

Scientific classification
- Kingdom: Animalia
- Phylum: Arthropoda
- Clade: Pancrustacea
- Class: Insecta
- Order: Orthoptera
- Suborder: Caelifera
- Infraorder: Acrididea
- Superfamily: †Locustopsoidea
- Family: †Locustopsidae; Handlirsch, 1906

Extinct family of grasshoppers

Locustopsidae is an extinct family of orthopterans known from the Mesozoic. They represent some of the oldest members of the suborder Caelifera.^{17} Members of the family closely resemble living grasshoppers of the superfamily Acridoidea in the shape of the body and wing venation. It is one of two families consistently placed in the superfamily Locustopsoidea, alongside the Triassic family Locustavidae, suggested to be united by characters of the wing, including "three-branched MA [M] and the branched MP+CuA [CuA+CuPaα] of the tegmina, as well as the branched MA of the hind wings". Locusopsoids have been suggested as some of the most basal members of Caelifera.^{323-345,539} Locustopsoidea has been proposed as the ancestral stock from which modern Tetrigoidea, Eumastacoidea, and Acridoidea arose.

There are about 17 genera and more than 60 described species in Locustopsidae.

== Genera ==
These 17 genera belong to the family Locustopsidae:

- † Araripelocusta Martins-Neto, 1995 Crato Formation, Brazil, Aptian
- † Britannacrida Gorochov, Jarzembowski & Coram, 2006 Lulworth Formation, United Kingdom, Berriasian
- † Conocephalella Strand, 1926 Solnhofen Limestone, Germany, Tithonian
- † Cratolocustopsis Martins-Neto, 2003 Crato Formation, Brazil, Aptian
- † Cratozeunerella Martins-Neto, 1998 Crato Formation, Brazil, Aptian
- † Liadolocusta Handlirsch, 1906 (dubious)
- † Locustopsis Handlirsch, 1906 Lilstock Formation, United Kingdom, Rhaetian, Dzhil Formation, Kyrgyzstan, Hettangian, Blue Lias, United Kingdom, Hettangian, Sagul Formation, Kyrgyzstan, Toarcian, Green Series, Posidonia Shale, Germany, Toarcian, Itat Formation, Russia, Bajocian/Bathonian, Daohugou, China, Callovian, Karabastau Formation, Kazakhstan, Oxfordian, Solnhofen Limestone, Germany, Tithonian, Tonsteinserie Formation, Egypt, Berriasian, Purbeck Group, United Kingdom, Berriasian
- † Locustrix Martins-Neto, 2003 Crato Formation, Brazil, Aptian
- † Mesolocustopsis Hong & Wang, 1990 Durlston Formation, United Kingdom, Berriasian, Weald Clay, United Kingdom, Barremian Laiyang Formation, China, Aptian
- † Orichalcum Whalley, 1985
- † Parapleurites Brauer, Redtenbacher & Ganglbauer, 1889 Cheremkhovskaya Formation, Russia, Toarcian, Morrison Formation, United States, Kimmeridgian
- † Plesioschwinzia Zessin, 1988 Green Series, Germany, Toarcian
- † Pseudoacrida Lin, 1982 Liupanshan Group, China, Barremian, Laiyang Formation, China, Aptian Crato Formation, Brazil, Aptian
- † Schwinzia Zessin, 1983 Green Series, Germany, Toarcian
- † Zessinia Martins-Neto, 1990 Lulworth Formation, United Kingdom, Berriasian, Crato Formation, Brazil, Aptian
- † Zeunerella Sharov, 1968 Weald Clay, United Kingdom, Hauterivian Kzyl-Zhar, Kazakhstan, Turonian
