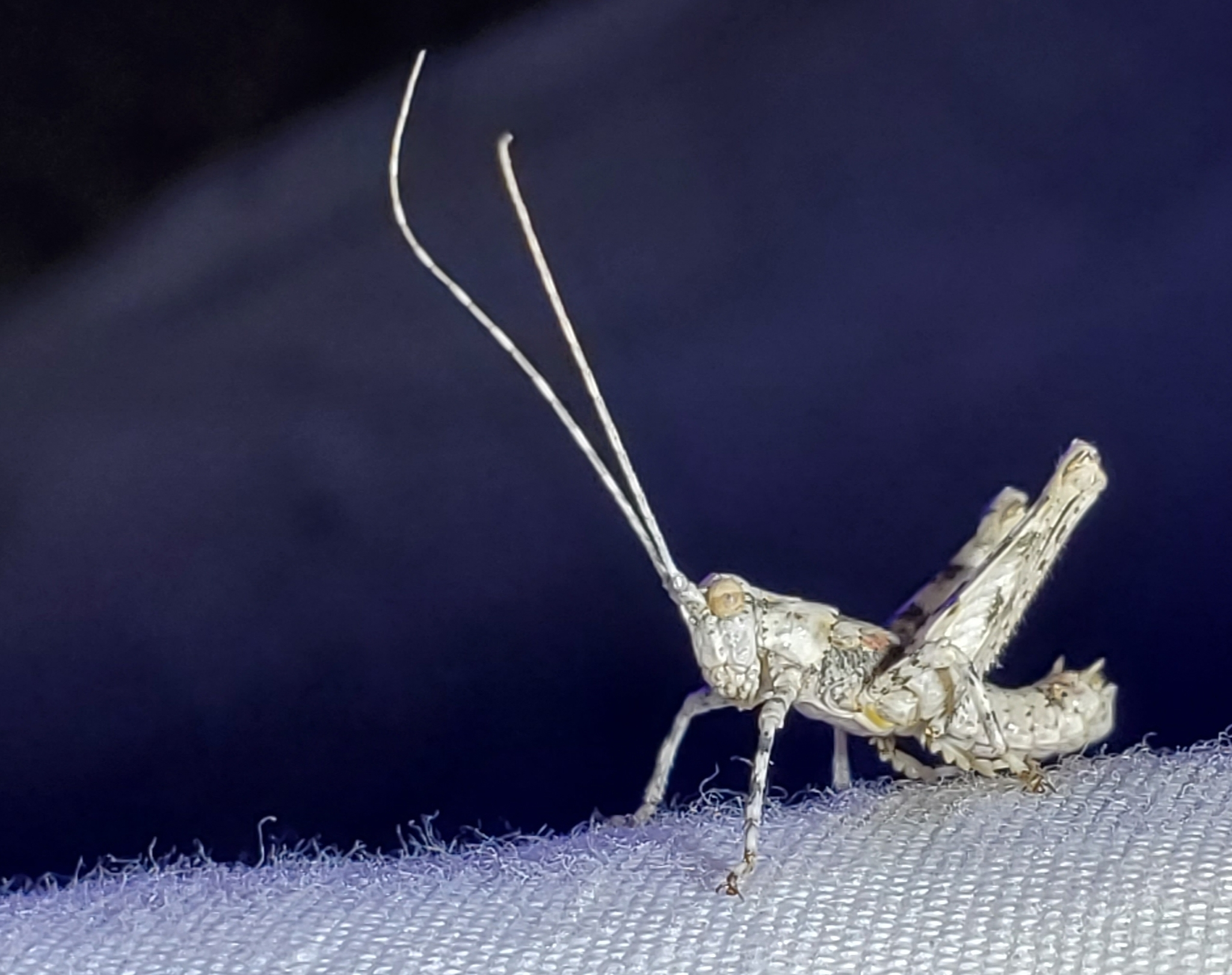

Scientific classification
- Kingdom: Animalia
- Phylum: Arthropoda
- Clade: Pancrustacea
- Class: Insecta
- Order: Orthoptera
- Suborder: Caelifera
- Infraorder: Acrididea
- Nanorder: Acridomorpha
- Superfamily: Tanaoceroidea; Rehn, 1948
- Family: Tanaoceridae; Rehn, 1948

Synonyms
- Mohavacrinae Tinkham, 1955; Tanaocerotinae Rehn, 1948

= Tanaoceridae =

Family of grasshoppers

External image
- Images at iNaturalist

The Tanaoceridae are an insect family in the monotypic superfamily Tanaoceroidea in the suborder Caelifera. They are sometimes called desert long-horned grasshoppers.

== Genera ==
Tanaoceridae comprises two genera:

- Mohavacris Rehn, 1948
- Tanaocerus Bruner, 1906
  - Type species: Tanaocerus koebelei Bruner, 1906

== Description ==
Grasshoppers in the Tanaoceridae have antennae that are thin and at least as long as the body, and therefore might be confused with members of the Ensifera (rather than Caelifera). They are slender to medium-sized, grey-spotted grasshoppers with powerful jumping hind legs. The two innermost joints of the antennae are short and thick, the other joints long and thin, so that the antenna is at least as long as the body. The facet eyes are round and protruding. These species are apterous, and the thorax is rather small, with a collared pronotum.

They live in dry areas and are active when it is relatively cool, at night and in late winter to early spring. Mohavacris timberlakei are found on wormwood shrubs ("sagebrush" or Artemisia spp.), where they are excellently camouflaged and resemble pieces of bark, while the Tanaocerus species live both in the bushes and on the ground. The eggs are probably laid in the ground and hatch in the autumn.
