= Eolocustopsidae =

Scientific classification
- Domain: Eukaryota
- Kingdom: Animalia
- Phylum: Arthropoda
- Class: Insecta
- Order: Orthoptera
- Suborder: Caelifera
- Infraorder: Acrididea
- Superfamily: †Locustopsoidea
- Family: †Eolocustopsidae; Riek, 1976

Extinct family of grasshoppers

Eolocustopsidae is an extinct family of grasshoppers in the order Orthoptera. There are at least two genera and two described species in Eolocustopsidae.

== Genera ==
These two genera belong to the family Eolocustopsidae:

- † Eolocustopsis Riek, 1976
- † Protettavus Riek, 1976
