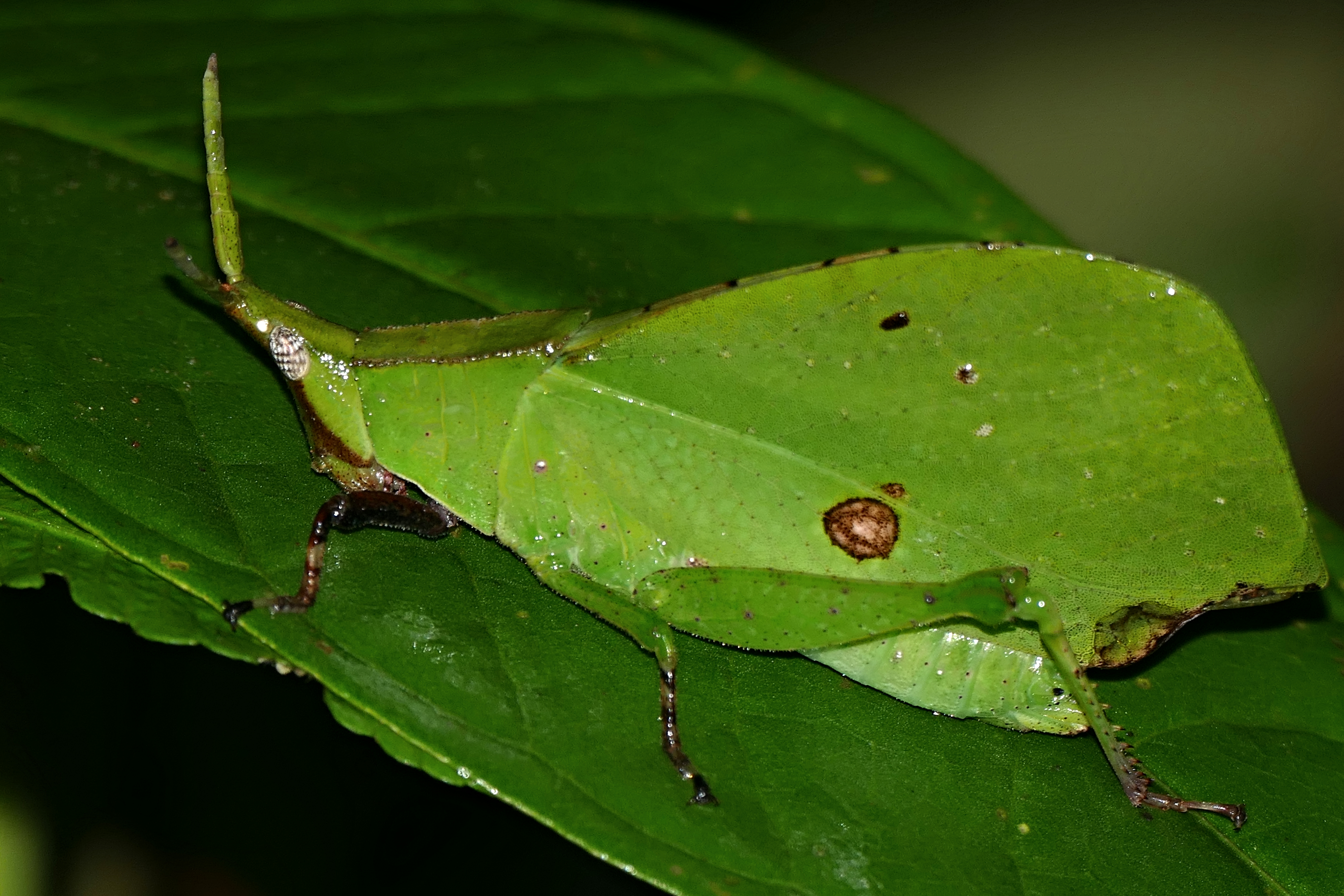
- A leaf grasshopper (Systella sp.)

Scientific classification
- Kingdom: Animalia
- Phylum: Arthropoda
- Class: Insecta
- Order: Orthoptera
- Suborder: Caelifera
- Superfamily: Trigonopterygoidea
- Family: Trigonopterygidae; Walker, 1870

Synonyms
- Trigonopterygidea Walker, 1870

= Trigonopterygidae =

Family of grasshoppers

The Trigonopterygidae are an insect family in the Orthoptera: Caelifera found in South Asia and Southeast Asia.

== Subfamilies and Genera ==
The Orthoptera Species File includes two sub-families:

Borneacridinae Kevan, 1952

Distribution: W. Malesia

1. Borneacris monotypic B. mirabilis Ramme, 1941
2. Moultonia monotypic M. violacea Bolívar, 1914

Trigonopteryginae Walker, 1870

1. Pseudopyrgus monotypic P. curtipennis Kevan, 1966 (Borneo)
2. Systella Westwood, 1841
3. Trigonopteryx Charpentier, 1841
