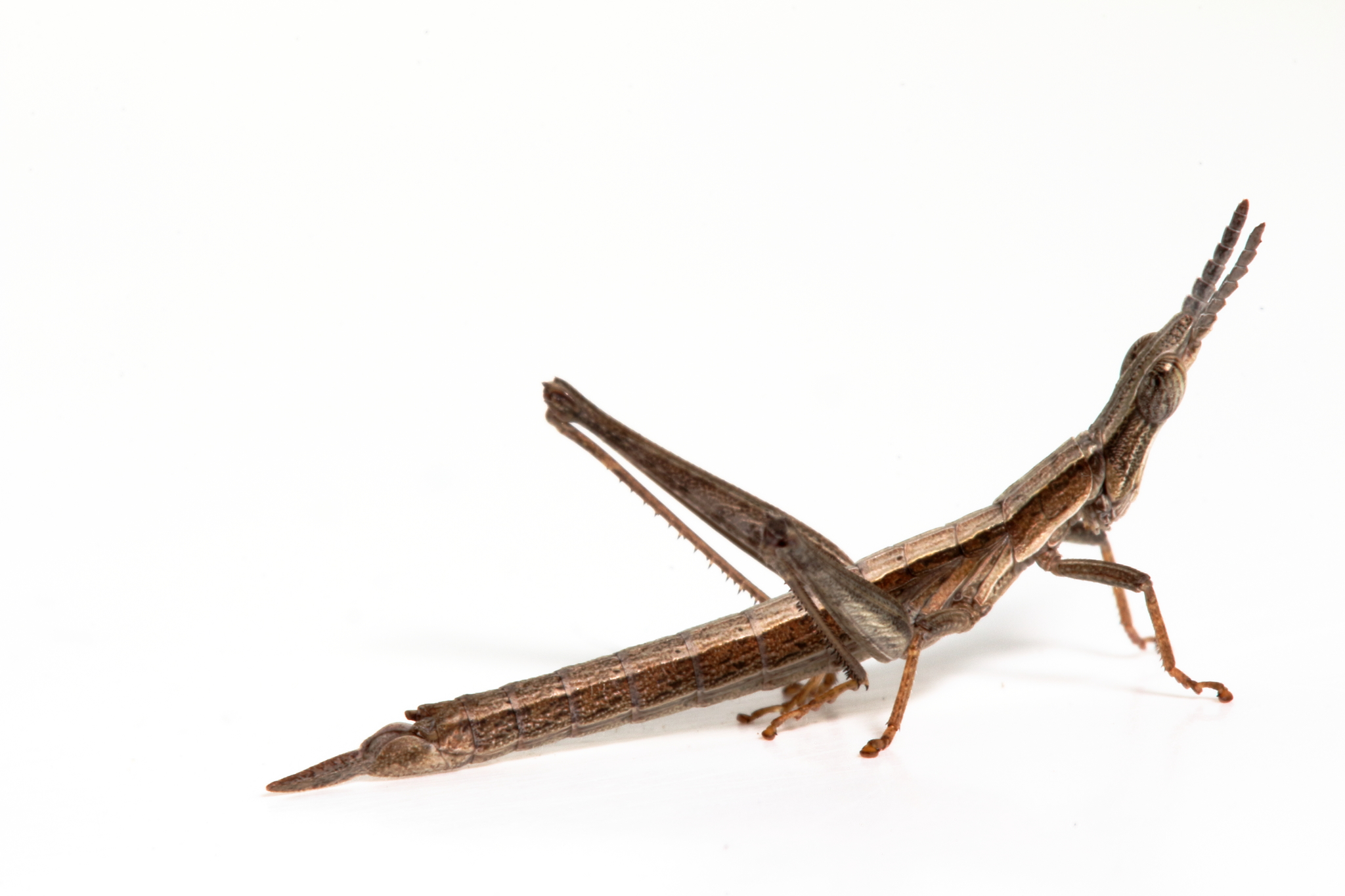
- Found in Australia

Scientific classification
- Kingdom: Animalia
- Phylum: Arthropoda
- Class: Insecta
- Order: Orthoptera
- Suborder: Caelifera
- Family: Morabidae
- Genus: Keyacris; Rehn, 1952

= Keyacris =

Genus of grasshoppers

Keyacris is a genus of grasshoppers belonging to the family Morabidae.

The species of this genus are found in Southern Australia.

Species:

- Keyacris interpres Rehn, 1952
- Keyacris marcida Rehn, 1952
- Keyacris scurra (Rehn, 1952)
