= Georgina syllophica =

Scientific classification
- Domain: Eukaryota
- Kingdom: Animalia
- Phylum: Arthropoda
- Class: Insecta
- Order: Orthoptera
- Suborder: Caelifera
- Family: Morabidae
- Tribe: Warramungini
- Genus: Georgina; Key, 1976
- Species: G. syllophica

Binomial name
- Georgina syllophica Key, 1976

Genus of grasshoppers

Georgina is a genus of grasshoppers in the family Morabidae. There is one described species, Georgina syllophica, found in Australia.
