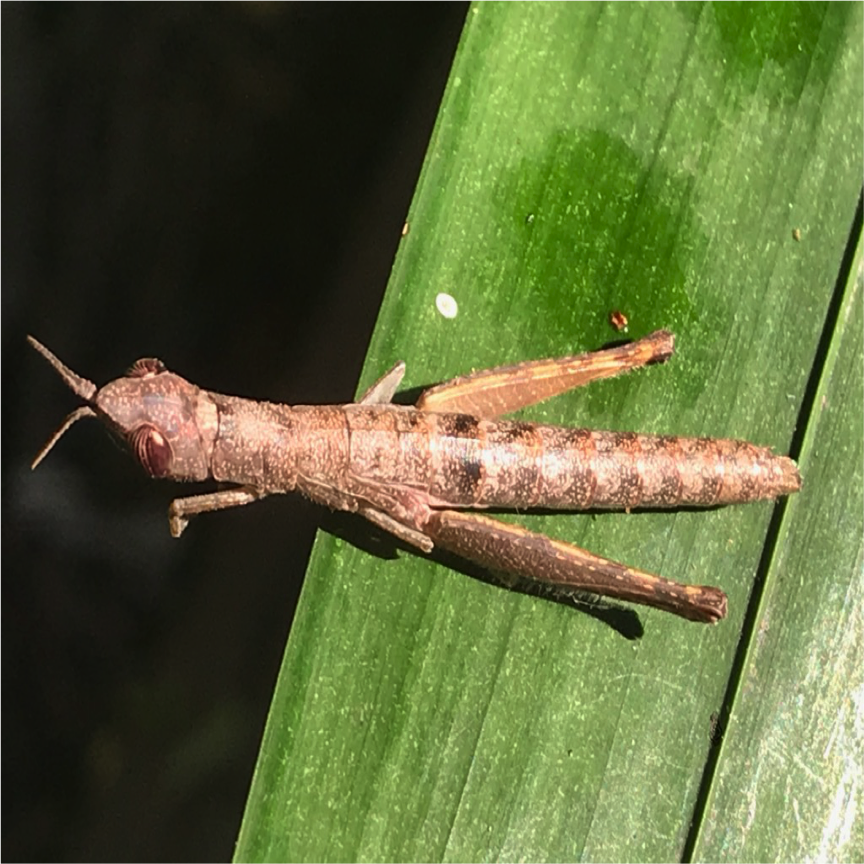

Scientific classification
- Domain: Eukaryota
- Kingdom: Animalia
- Phylum: Arthropoda
- Class: Insecta
- Order: Orthoptera
- Suborder: Caelifera
- Family: Morabidae
- Genus: Geckomima; Key, 1976

Species
- See text

= Geckomima =

Genus of grasshoppers

Geckomima is a genus of grasshoppers in the family Morabidae. It is mostly found in northern Australian savannahs.

Species include:

- Geckomima arnhemana Key, 1982
- Geckomima brevicornis Walker, 1870
- Geckomima brevirostris Sjöstedt, 1921
- Geckomima drysdaleana Key, 1982
- Geckomima gecko Sjöstedt, 1920
- Geckomima handschini Key, 1982
- Geckomima leopoldana Key, 1982
- Geckomima lesueuri Rehn, 1952
- Geckomima nepos Key, 1982
- Geckomima pilbara Key, 1982
- Geckomima tindalei Key, 1982
- Geckomima yampi Key, 1982
