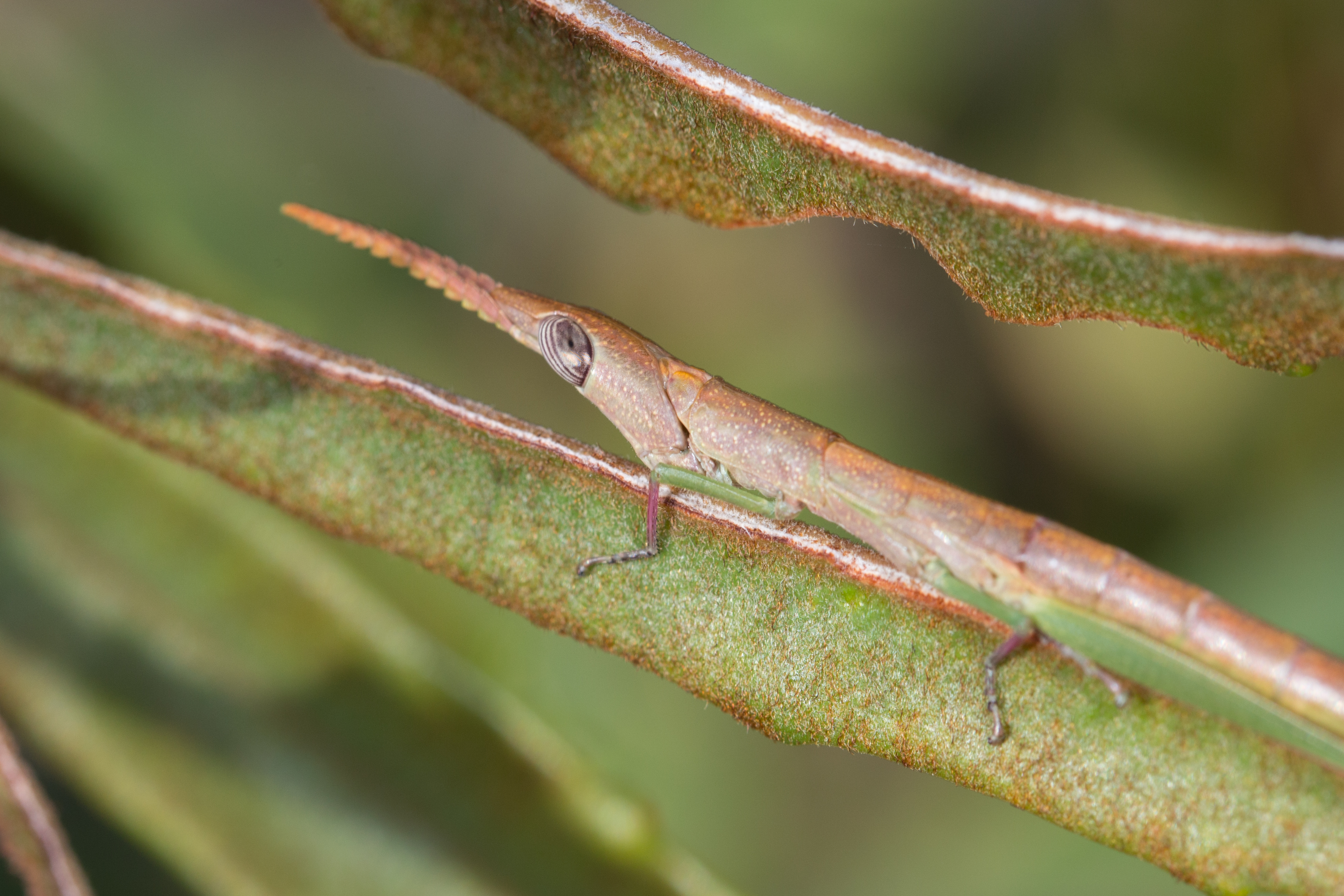
- Callitala major

Scientific classification
- Domain: Eukaryota
- Kingdom: Animalia
- Phylum: Arthropoda
- Class: Insecta
- Order: Orthoptera
- Suborder: Caelifera
- Superfamily: Eumastacoidea
- Family: Morabidae; Rehn, 1948

= Morabidae =

Family of grasshoppers

Morabidae is a family of grasshoppers in the order Orthoptera. There are more than 40 genera and 120 described species in Morabidae, found in Australasia.

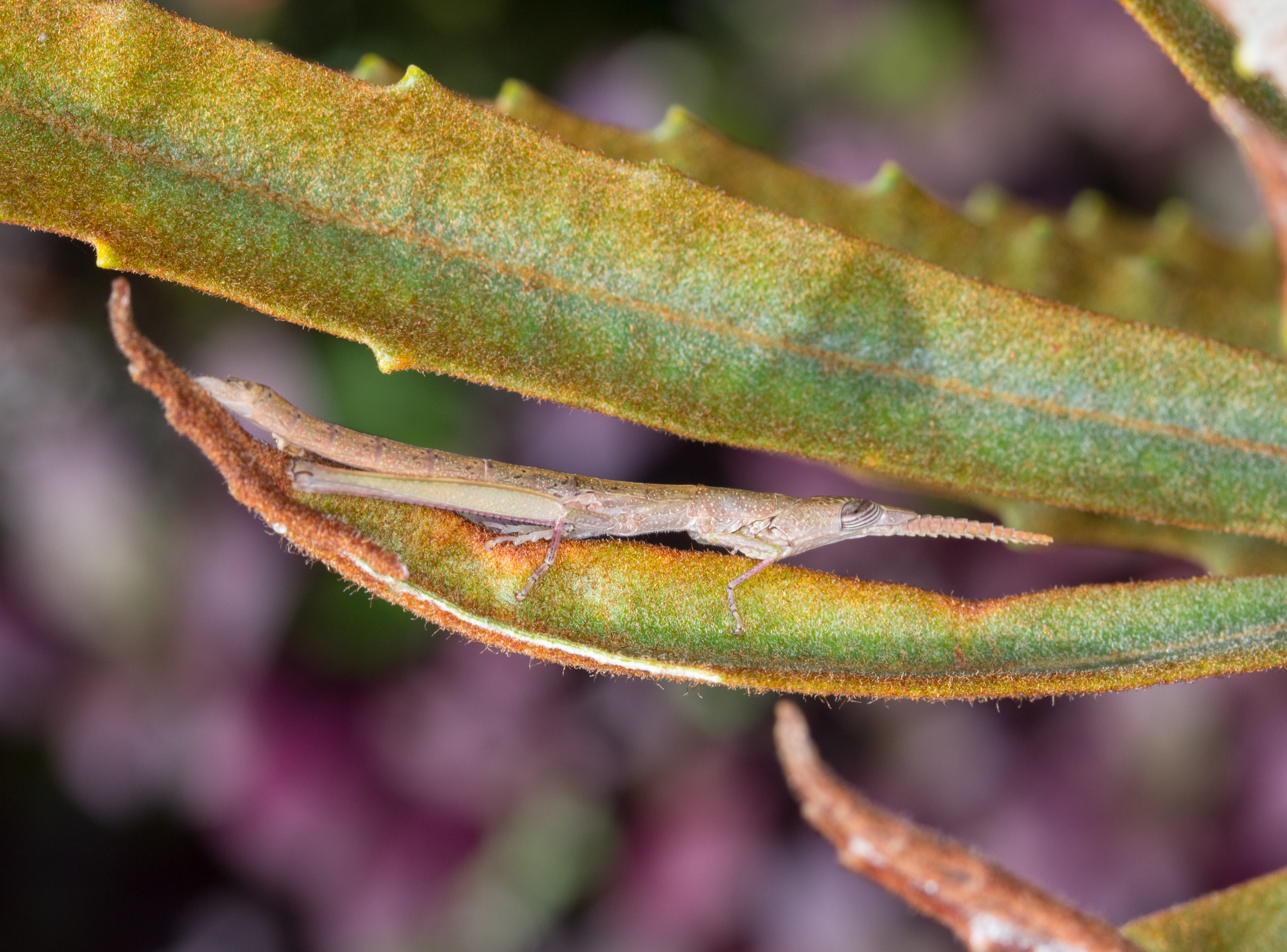
Callitala major

== Genera ==
These 42 genera belong to the family Morabidae:

- Achuraba Key, 1976
- Achurimima Key, 1976
- Alatiplica Key, 1976
- Aliena Key, 1976
- Amangu Key, 1976
- Aruntina Key, 1976
- Baruca Key, 1976
- Biroella Bolívar, 1903
- Bundinja Key, 1976
- Callimunga Key, 1976
- Callita Key, 1976
- Callitala Sjöstedt, 1921
- Capsigera Key, 1976
- Carnarvonella Key, 1976
- Chinnicka Key, 1976
- Crois Key, 1976
- Culmacris Key, 1976
- Drysdalopila Key, 1977
- Filoraba Key, 1976
- Flindersella Key, 1976
- Furculifera Key, 1976
- Geckomima Key, 1976
- Georgina Key, 1976
- Hastella Key, 1976
- Heide Key, 1976
- Keyacris Rehn, 1952
- Malleolopha Key, 1976
- Micromeeka Key, 1976
- Moraba Walker, 1870
- Moritala Key, 1976
- Namatjira Key, 1976
- Nanihospita Key, 1976
- Prorifera Key, 1976
- Proscopiomima Key, 1976
- Sicula Key, 1976
- Spectriforma Key, 1976
- Stiletta Key, 1976
- Swanea Key, 1976
- Vandiemenella Key, 1976
- Warramaba Key, 1976
- Warramunga Rehn, 1952
- Whiteacris Key, 1976
