= Namatjira (grasshopper) =

Scientific classification
- Kingdom: Animalia
- Phylum: Arthropoda
- Class: Insecta
- Order: Orthoptera
- Suborder: Caelifera
- Family: Morabidae
- Tribe: Capsigerini
- Genus: Namatjira; Key, 1976

Genus of grasshoppers

Namatjira is a genus of grasshoppers in the family Morabidae. There are at least two described species in Namatjira, found in Australia.

== Species ==
These two species belong to the genus Namatjira:

- Namatjira aliciae Key, 1976
- Namatjira centralis (Rehn, 1952)
