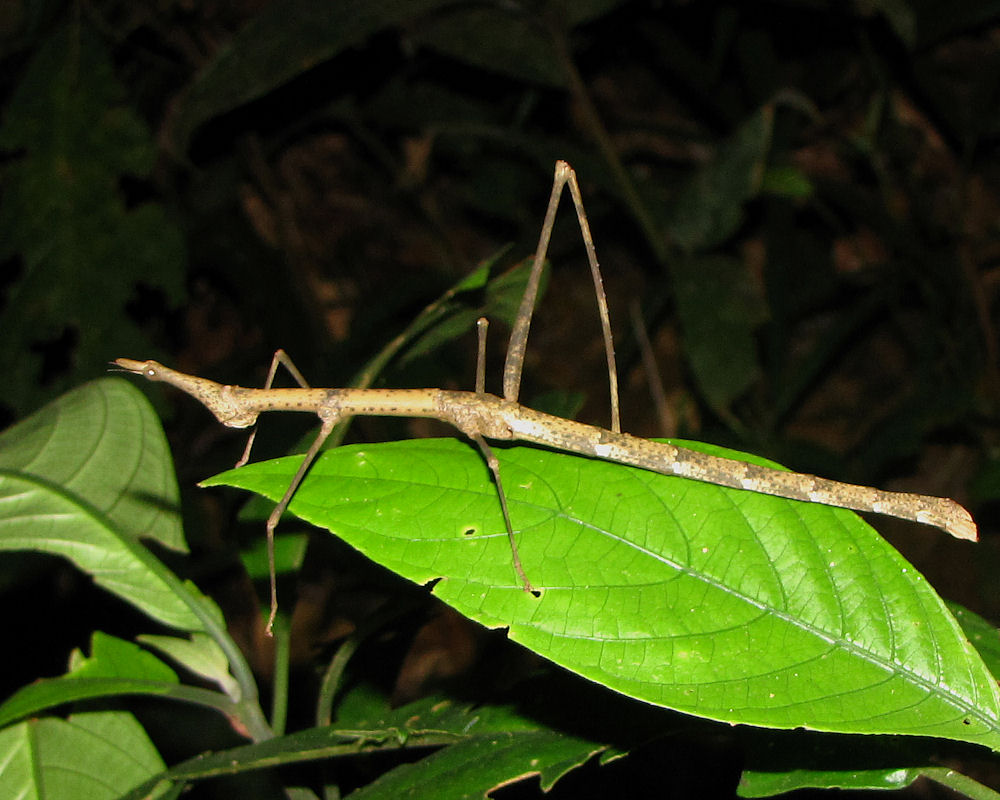
- Horsehead grasshopper (Pseudoproscopia scabra), Tambopata National Reserve, Peru

Scientific classification
- Domain: Eukaryota
- Kingdom: Animalia
- Phylum: Arthropoda
- Class: Insecta
- Order: Orthoptera
- Suborder: Caelifera
- Informal group: Acridomorpha
- Superfamily: Proscopioidea
- Family: Proscopiidae; Serville, 1838

Synonyms
- Proscopides

= Proscopiidae =

Family of grasshoppers

Proscopiidae is a family of Neotropical grasshoppers, now placed in its own superfamily, the Proscopioidea. Some species may be known as stick grasshoppers or jumping sticks. Within the family Proscopiidae, there are 34 genera and 228 different species. The proscopiids are herbivores and feed on a variety of plants in a variety of environmental conditions. Due to the insects being herbivores, they also have the ability to cause significant damage to the agriculture of their neotropical habitat. Identifying Proscopiidae is extremely difficult due to their close resemblance to a couple of other species of insect and the fact that the proscopiid taxonomy is far from complete.

== Subfamilies and selected genera ==
The Orthoptera Species File lists three subfamilies, with several genera unplaced:

- Hybusinae Liana, 1980 (monotypic)
  - Hybusa Erichson, 1844
- Proscopiinae Serville, 1838
  - Tribe Proscopiini Serville, 1838
    - Proscopia Klug, 1820
    - Pseudoproscopia Bentos-Pereira, 2006
  - Tribe Tetanorhynchini Bentos-Pereira, 2003
    - Scleratoscopia Jago, 1990
    - Tetanorhynchus Brunner von Wattenwyl, 1890
- Xeniinae Liana, 1980
  - Xenium Liana, 1980
- incertae sedis
  - Bazylukia Liana, 1972
  - Bolidorhynchus Jago, 1990
  - Eoproscopia† Heads, 2008
  - Epsigrypa Mello-Leitão, 1939
  - Nodutus Liana, 1972
  - Orthophastigia Tapia, 1982
  - Scopaeoscleratoscopia Jago, 1990
