= Locustavidae =

Locustavidae Temporal range: Early Triassic–Middle Jurassic

Scientific classification
- Kingdom: Animalia
- Phylum: Arthropoda
- Clade: Pancrustacea
- Class: Insecta
- Order: Orthoptera
- Suborder: Caelifera
- Infraorder: Acrididea
- Superfamily: †Locustopsoidea
- Family: †Locustavidae; Sharov, 1968

Extinct family of grasshoppers

Locustavidae is an extinct family of grasshoppers in the order Orthoptera. There are about 7 genera and 13 described species in Locustavidae, with fossils found in Australia, China, Kyrgyzstan, and Russia.

== Genera ==
These seven genera belong to the family Locustavidae:

- † Brevilocustavus Gorochov, 2005
- † Juralocustavus Nel, Xu & Huang, 2026
- † Locustavus Sharov, 1968
- † Mesacridites Riek, 1954
- † Miolocustavus Gorochov, 2005
- † Praelocustopsis Sharov, 1968
- † Triassolocusta Tillyard, 1922
