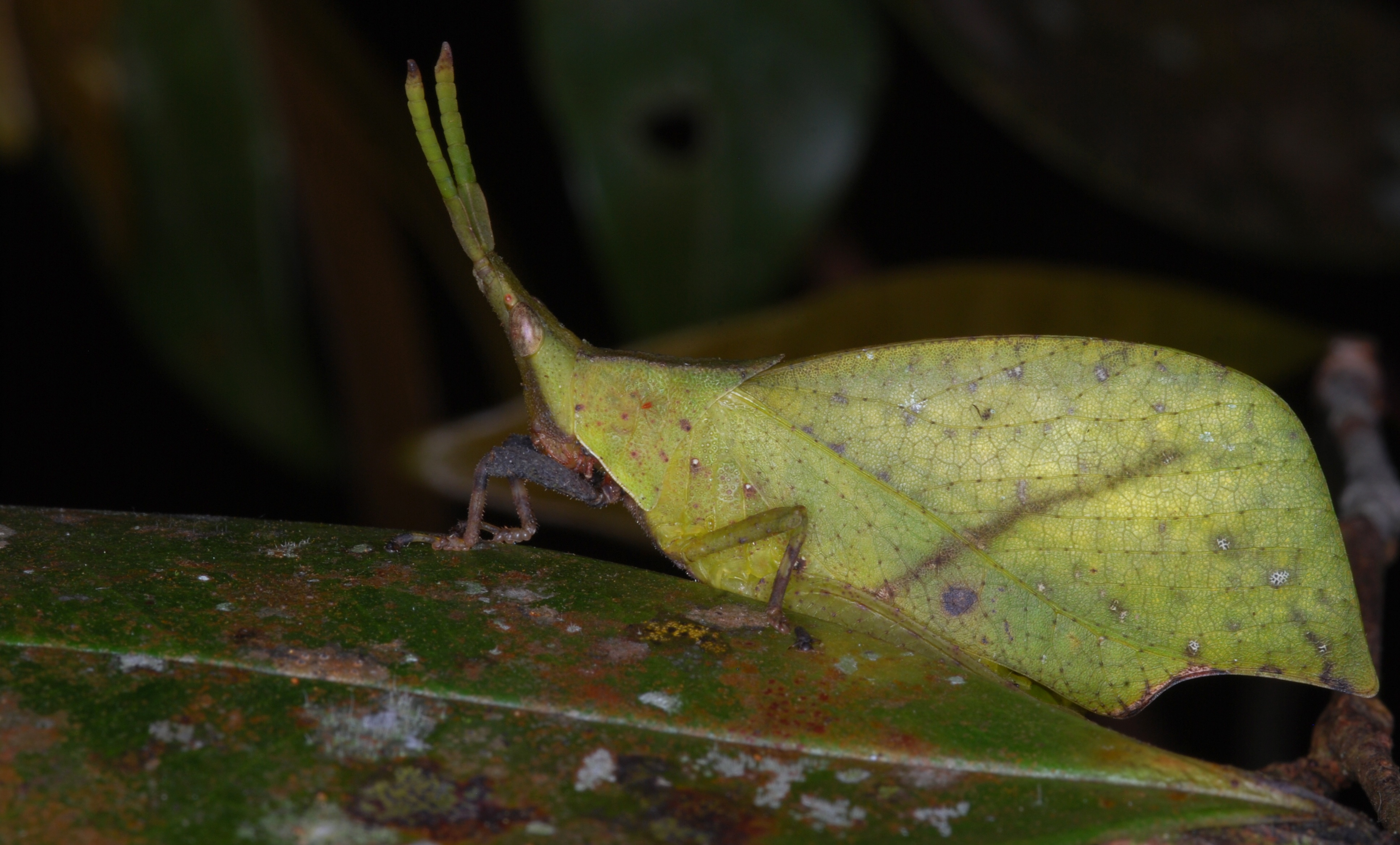
- Leaf grasshopper (Systella sp.) from Malaysia

Scientific classification
- Kingdom: Animalia
- Phylum: Arthropoda
- Class: Insecta
- Order: Orthoptera
- Suborder: Caelifera
- Nanorder: Acridomorpha
- Superfamily: Trigonopterygoidea; Walker, 1870

= Trigonopterygoidea =

Superfamily of grasshoppers

The Trigonopterygoidea are an insect superfamily in the Orthoptera: Caelifera. Sometimes described as leaf grasshoppers, American species in the Xyronotidae have also been called razor-backed bush-hoppers.

== Families and distribution ==
The Orthoptera Species File lists two families:

- Trigonopterygidae Walker, 1870: found in south and south-east Asia
1. subfamily Borneacridinae Kevan, 1952
2. subfamily Trigonopteryginae Walker, 1870
- Xyronotidae Bolívar, 1909: found in Central America north to Mexico
1. genus Axyronotus Dirsh & Mason, 1979
2. genus Xyronotus Saussure, 1884
