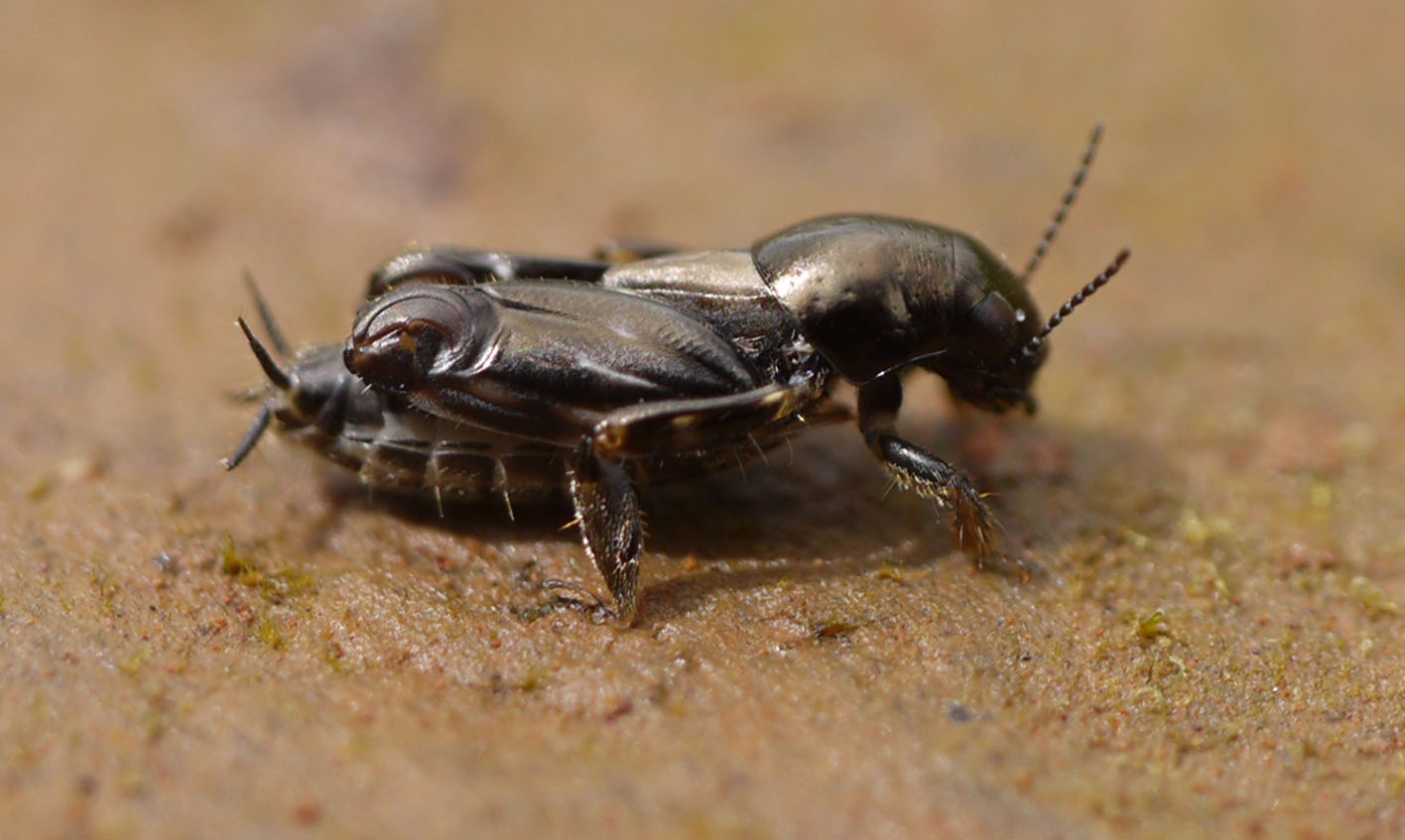
- A pygmy mole-cricket
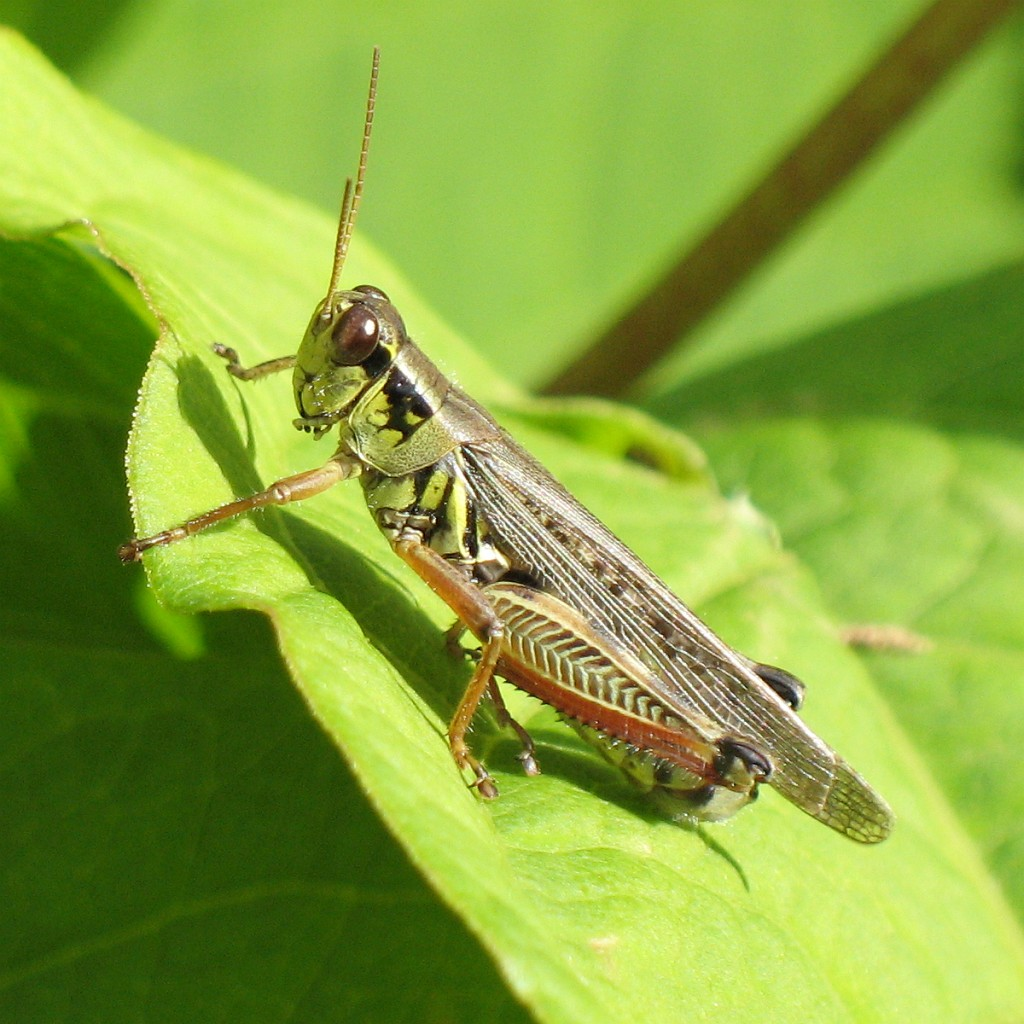
- Red-legged grasshopper

Scientific classification
- Kingdom: Animalia
- Phylum: Arthropoda
- Clade: Pancrustacea
- Class: Insecta
- Order: Orthoptera
- Suborder: Caelifera; Ander, 1939

Infraorders
- Acrididea; Tridactylidea

= Caelifera =

Caelifera Temporal range: Changhsingian–Present

Suborder of insects

The Caelifera are a suborder of orthopteran insects. They include the grasshoppers and grasshopper-like insects, as well as other superfamilies classified with them: the ground-hoppers (Tetrigoidea) and pygmy mole crickets (Tridactyloidea). The latter should not be confused with the mole crickets (Gryllotalpidae), which belong to the other Orthopteran suborder Ensifera.

The name of this suborder comes from Latin meaning chisel-bearing ("chisel" in Latin: caelum), referring to the "stout" shape of its species' ovipositors.

== Subdivisions and their distribution ==
The Caelifera include some 2,400 valid genera and about 12,000 known species. Many undescribed species probably exist, especially in tropical forests. The Caelifera have a predominantly tropical distribution (as with most Orthoptera) with fewer species known from temperate climate zones. Caelifera are divided into two infraorders: the Tridactylidea and the Acrididea, or grasshopper-like species. This latter name is derived from older sources, such as Imms, which placed the "short-horned grasshoppers" and locusts at the family level (Acrididae).

- Infraorder Tridactylidea
  - Tridactyloidea Brullé, 1835: pygmy mole crickets - all continents except Antarctica
  - Dzhajloutshelloidea Gorochov, 1994 †
- Infraorder Acrididea
  - Tetrigoidea (monotypic) Serville, 1838: groundhoppers or "grouse locusts" - all continents except Antarctica
  - Informal superfamily group Acridomorpha - the grasshoppers
    - Acridoidea MacLeay, 1821: most grasshoppers – World-wide - approx. 10,000 species in the Acrididae alone
    - Eumastacoidea Burr, 1899: "monkey grasshoppers" - Americas, Africa, Australasia
    - †Locustopsoidea Handlirsch, 1906
      - †Locustopsidae
      - †Locustavidae
    - Pneumoroidea Blanchard, 1845: "bladder grasshoppers" - Africa
    - Proscopioidea Serville, 1838 - south America
    - Pyrgomorphoidea (monotypic) B. von Wattenwyl, 1882: "gaudy grasshoppers" - all tropical/subtropical continents
    - Tanaoceroidea (monotypic) Rehn, 1948: "desert long-horned grasshoppers" - north America
    - Trigonopterygoidea Walker, 1870: "razor-backed bush-hoppers" - Central America, south-east Asia

=== Affiliations ===
The phylogeny of the Caelifera, is described in detail for grasshoppers, with six out of eight extant superfamilies shown here as a cladogram. Like the Ensifera, Caelifera and all of its superfamilies appear to be monophyletic.

- Orthoptera
  - Ensifera (crickets, etc.)
    [6 superfamilies]
  - Caelifera
    - Tridactylidea
      Tridactyloidea
    - Acrididea
      - Tetrigoidea
      - Acridomorpha
        - Eumastacoidea
        - - Pneumoroidea
          - - Pyrgomorphoidea
            - Acridoidea etc.

The phylogeny of the Caelifera, based on mitochondrial ribosomal RNA of thirty-two taxa in six out of seven superfamilies, is shown as a cladogram. The Ensifera, Caelifera and all the superfamilies of grasshoppers except Pamphagoidea appear to be monophyletic.

- Orthoptera
  - Ensifera (crickets)
    [6 superfamilies]
  - Caelifera
    - Tridactyloidea
    - - Tetrigoidea
      - - Eumastacidae
        - - Proscopiidae
          - - Pneumoridae
            - - Pyrgomorphidae
              - Acrididae + Pamphagidae

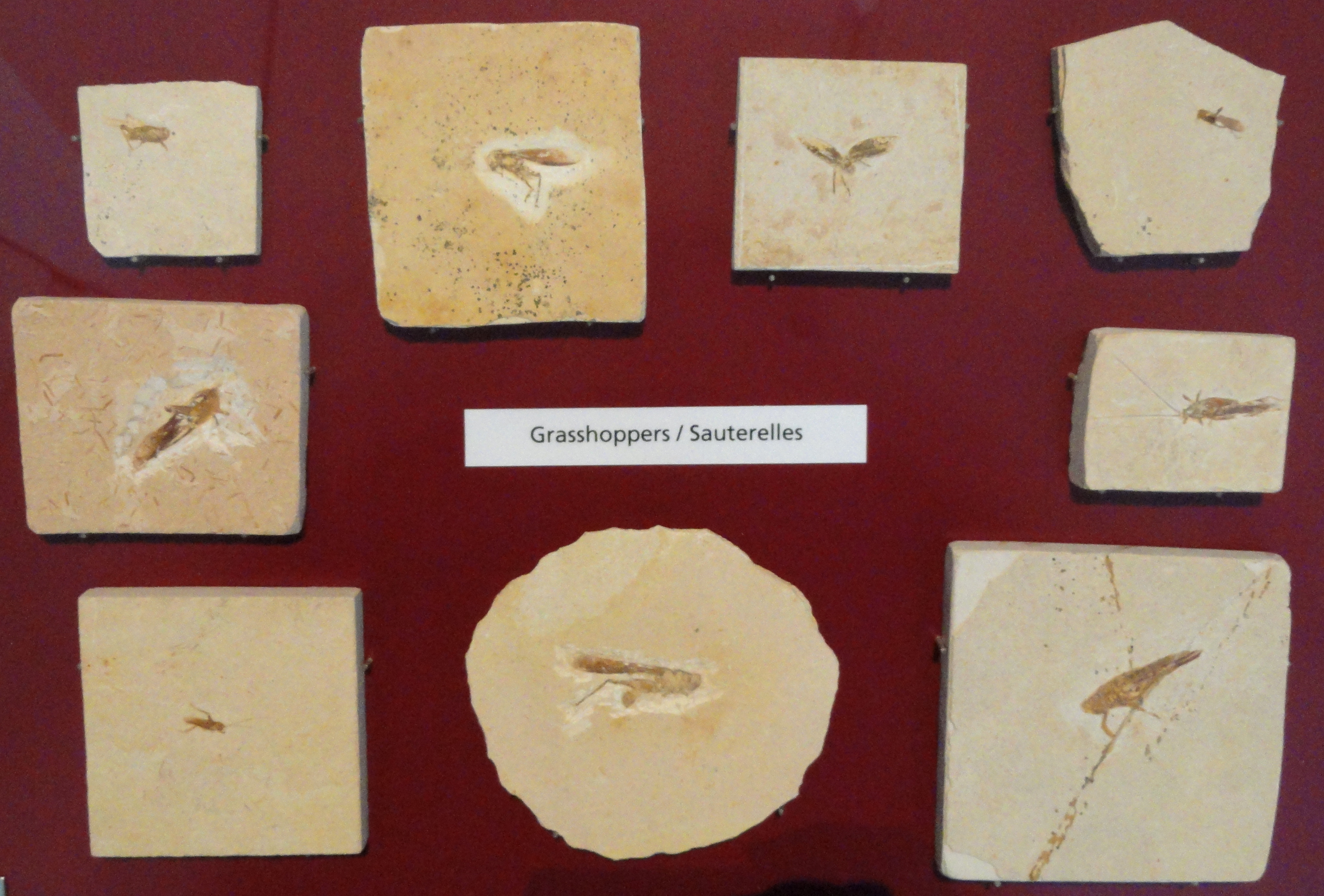
Fossil grasshoppers at the Royal Ontario Museum

In evolutionary terms, the split between the Caelifera and the Ensifera is no more recent than the Permo-Triassic boundary; the earliest insects that are certainly Caeliferans are Eolocustopsis of family Eolocustopsidae from the latest Permian (Changhsingian) of the Beaufort Group, South Africa, followed by Locustavidae and Dzhajloutshellidae from the mid-Triassic (Ladinian age), roughly 242 to 237 million years ago. The group diversified during the Triassic and have remained important plant-eaters from that time to now. The first modern families such as the Eumastacidae, Tetrigidae and Tridactylidae appeared in the Cretaceous, though some insects that might belong to the last two of these groups are found in the early Jurassic. Morphological classification is difficult because many taxa have converged towards a common habitat type; recent taxonomists have concentrated on the internal genitalia, especially those of the male. This information is not available from fossil specimens, and the paleontological taxonomy is founded principally on the venation of the hindwings.

The Caelifera includes some 2,400 valid genera and about 11,000 known species. Many undescribed species probably exist, especially in tropical wet forests. The Caelifera have a predominantly tropical distribution with fewer species known from temperate zones, but most of the superfamilies have representatives worldwide. They are almost exclusively herbivorous and are probably the oldest living group of chewing herbivorous insects.

The most diverse superfamily is the Acridoidea, with around 8,000 species. The two main families in this are the Acrididae (grasshoppers and locusts) with a worldwide distribution, and the Romaleidae (lubber grasshoppers), found chiefly in the New World. The Ommexechidae and Tristiridae are South American, and the Lentulidae, Lithidiidae and Pamphagidae are mainly African. The Pauliniids are nocturnal and can swim or skate on water, and the Lentulids are wingless. Pneumoridae are native to Africa, particularly southern Africa, and are distinguished by the inflated abdomens of the males.

== Economic significance and terminology ==
A number of species, especially in the Acridoidea, are significant agricultural pests, but not all of them are locusts: a non-taxonomic term referring to species whose populations which may change morphologically when crowded and show swarming behaviour. Examples of agricultural grasshopper pests that are not called locusts include the Senegalese grasshopper and certain species in the Pyrgomorphidae, notably the variegated grasshopper (Zonocerus variegatus).

== See also ==
- List of Orthopteroid genera containing species recorded in Europe
