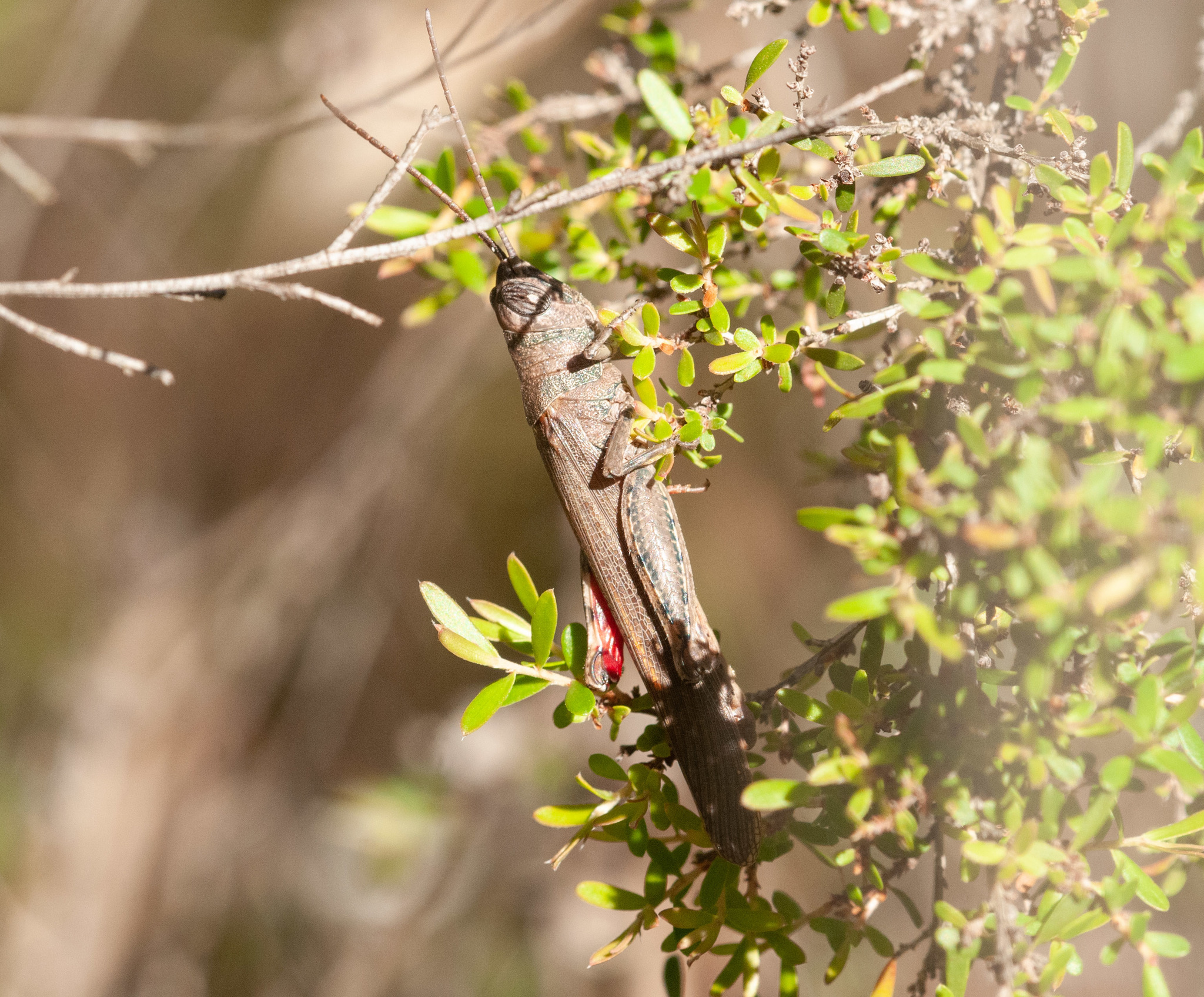
- Pardillana limbata, Common Pardillana, Australia

Scientific classification
- Kingdom: Animalia
- Phylum: Arthropoda
- Clade: Pancrustacea
- Class: Insecta
- Order: Orthoptera
- Suborder: Caelifera
- Family: Acrididae
- Subfamily: Catantopinae
- Tribe: Catantopini
- Genus: Pardillana
- Species: P. limbata

Binomial name
- Pardillana limbata (Stål, 1878)

= Pardillana limbata =

Species of short-horned grasshopper

Pardillana limbata, the common pardillana, is a species of short-horned grasshopper in the family Acrididae. It is found in Australia.
