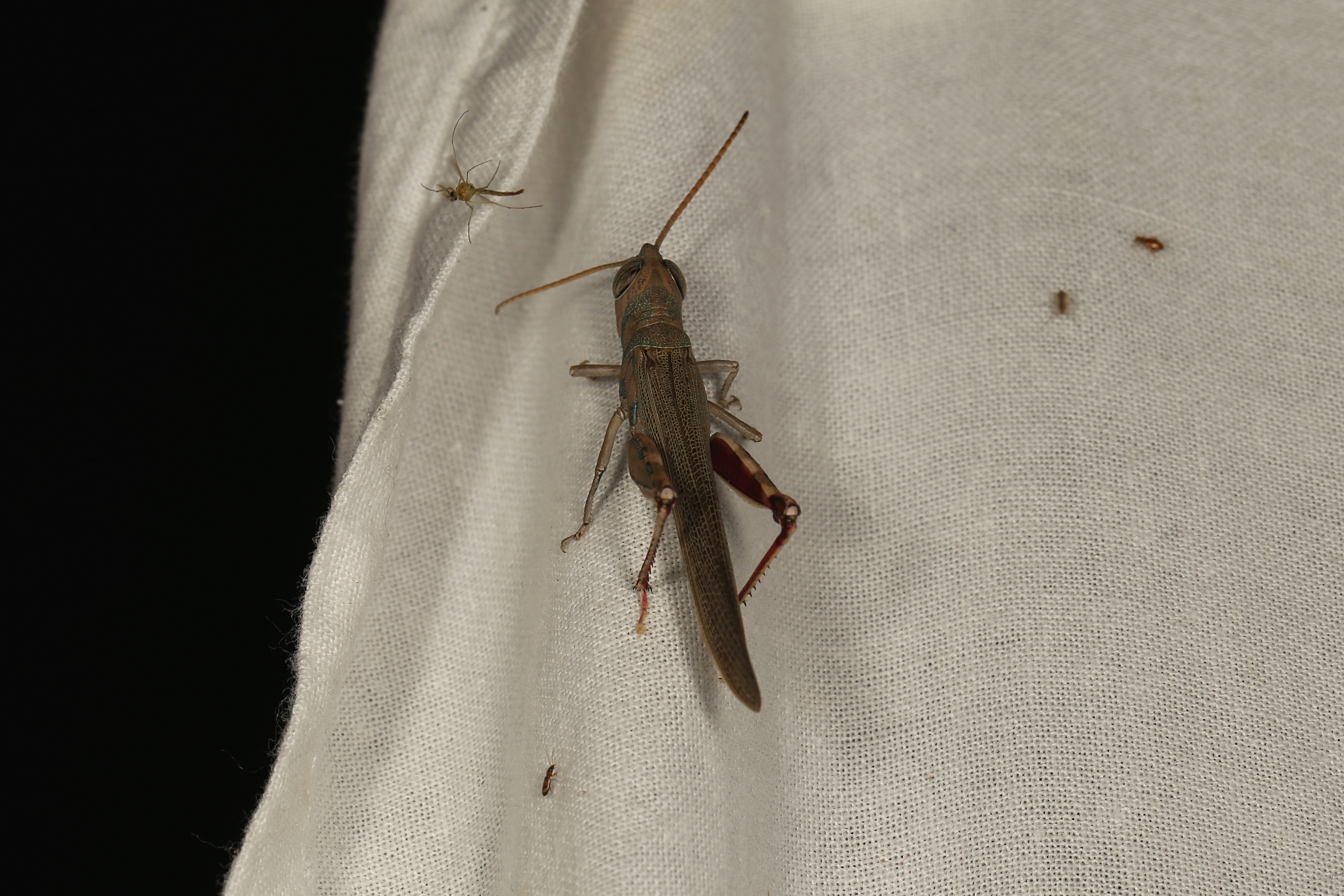
- Pardillana sp.

Scientific classification
- Kingdom: Animalia
- Phylum: Arthropoda
- Clade: Pancrustacea
- Class: Insecta
- Order: Orthoptera
- Suborder: Caelifera
- Superfamily: Acridoidea
- Family: Acrididae
- Subfamily: Catantopinae
- Tribe: Catantopini
- Genus: Pardillana; B. Y. Sjöstedt, 1920

= Pardillana =

Genus of grasshoppers

Pardillana is a genus of grasshoppers in the family Acrididae and tribe Catantopini, from Australia.

== Species ==
- Pardillana ampla Sjöstedt, 1920
- Pardillana dubia Sjöstedt, 1921
- Pardillana exempta (Walker, 1870)
- Pardillana limbata (Stål, 1878)
