= Pardillana exempta =

Scientific classification
- Kingdom: Animalia
- Phylum: Arthropoda
- Clade: Pancrustacea
- Class: Insecta
- Order: Orthoptera
- Suborder: Caelifera
- Family: Acrididae
- Genus: Pardillana
- Species: P. exempta

Binomial name
- Pardillana exempta Walker, 1870

Species of grasshopper

Pardillana exempta is a species of grasshopper in the genus Pardillana of the family Acrididae. It was described by Francis Walker in 1870.

== Synonyms ==
Goniaea fuscula Stål, 1878 is a synonym for this species.
