= Yucca Forest =

Valley in Clark County, Nevada, United States

- Floor elevation: 1,733 m (5,686 ft)

Geography
- Location: Clark County, Nevada, United States
- Coordinates: 36°31′56″N 115°09′49″W
- Topo map: USGS Sheep Peak
- Traversed by: Mormon Well Road; Pine Nut Road
- Interactive map of Yucca Forest

The Yucca Forest is a valley in Clark County, Nevada, United States, located in the Desert National Wildlife Refuge north of Las Vegas. It is surrounded by the Sheep Range to the north and west and Las Vegas Range to the south and east.

== Flora ==
The Yucca Forest is named for its dense distribution of yucca plants, including Joshua trees, Banana yuccas, and Mojave yuccas. The valley is very grassy compared to the surrounding landscapes due to the abundancy of rain it receives and is covered in shrubs, bunchgrasses, and forbs among other plants.

== Roads ==
The valley is traversed by Mormon Well Road, a long dirt road which passes through the Yucca Gap from Corn Creek near U.S. Route 95 to cross the southern side of the valley towards Desert Pass Campground, Mormon Well Spring, and U.S. Route 93. Another dirt road, Pine Nut Road, spurs off of Mormon Well Road in the Yucca Forest and heads northwest towards the Sheep Range.

== Wildfire ==
In the 1990s, a wildfire burnt a large portion of the northern half of the valley, and a large burn area remains visible from space.
