= Arrow Canyon Wilderness =

Protected wilderness area in Nevada, United States

- IUCN category Ib (wilderness area)
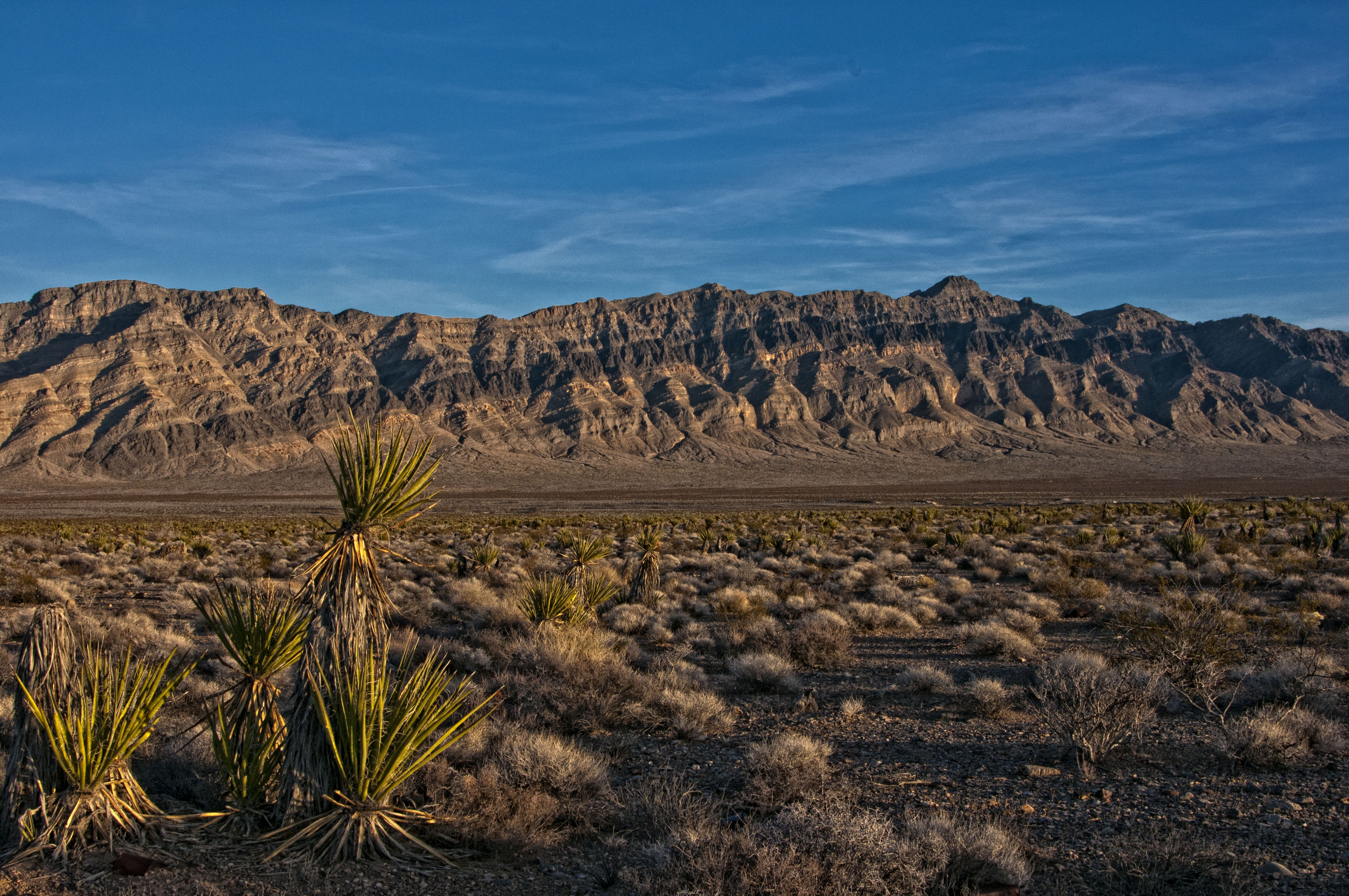

- Location within the United States
- Location: Clark County, Nevada, USA
- Nearest city: Glendale, Nevada
- Coordinates: 36°42′N 114°52′W
- Area: 27,530 acres (11,140 ha)
- Established: 2002
- Governing body: Bureau of Land Management

Arrow Canyon Wilderness is a 27,530-acre (11,140 ha) wilderness area located in Clark County in the U.S. state of Nevada. It received wilderness designation with the passage of the Clark County Conservation of Public Land and Natural Resources Act of 2002 and protects the northern portion of the Arrow Canyon Range. The Arrow Canyon Wilderness is managed by the Bureau of Land Management.

== Topography ==
Arrow Canyon Wilderness is made up of three distinct landforms: the craggy Arrow Canyon Range; wide valleys; and deep canyons. The Arrow Range lies along the west edge of the wilderness. This craggy block of tilted sedimentary carbonate rock exposes the underlying strata along the west side of the ridge. This fault scarp is several thousand feet high and is marked by black and white bands of carbonate rock and quartzite that run the length of the entire range. The northeastern central portion of the wilderness area contains a wide valley cut by numerous washes, while the east side is characterized by a series of deep washes, including Arrow Canyon with nearly vertical sides several hundred feet deep.

== Archeology ==
There are extensive petroglyph panels on the rock walls of Pahranagat Wash, above, below, and in Arrow Canyon. Other evidence of prehistoric use includes agave roasting pits, shelter caves, rock alignments, lithic scatters, stone scrapers, and broken arrowheads. The Moapa Band of Paiutes still resides in the area just east of the Arrow Canyon Range.

== Wildlife ==
Common wildlife found in Arrow Canyon Wilderness include California myotis, yellow bat, western red bat, hoary bat, desert five-spot, desert tortoise, desert bighorn sheep, chuckwalla, cactus wren, canyon wren, rock wren, and Ashash-throated flycatcher.

== Vegetation ==
Common vegetation found in Arrow Canyon Wilderness include creosote bush, white bursage, mojave yucca, and barrel cactus, as well as blackbrush at higher elevations. Honey mesquite, catclaw acacia, and saltcedar are common in washes in the central and eastern portions of the Wilderness. The uncommon butterfly bush (Buddleja utahensis) is also quite common here.

== See also ==
- List of wilderness areas in Nevada
- List of U.S. Wilderness Areas
- Wilderness Act
