= Corn Creek, Nevada =

Unincorporated community in Nevada, US

Corn Creek
- Unincorporated community
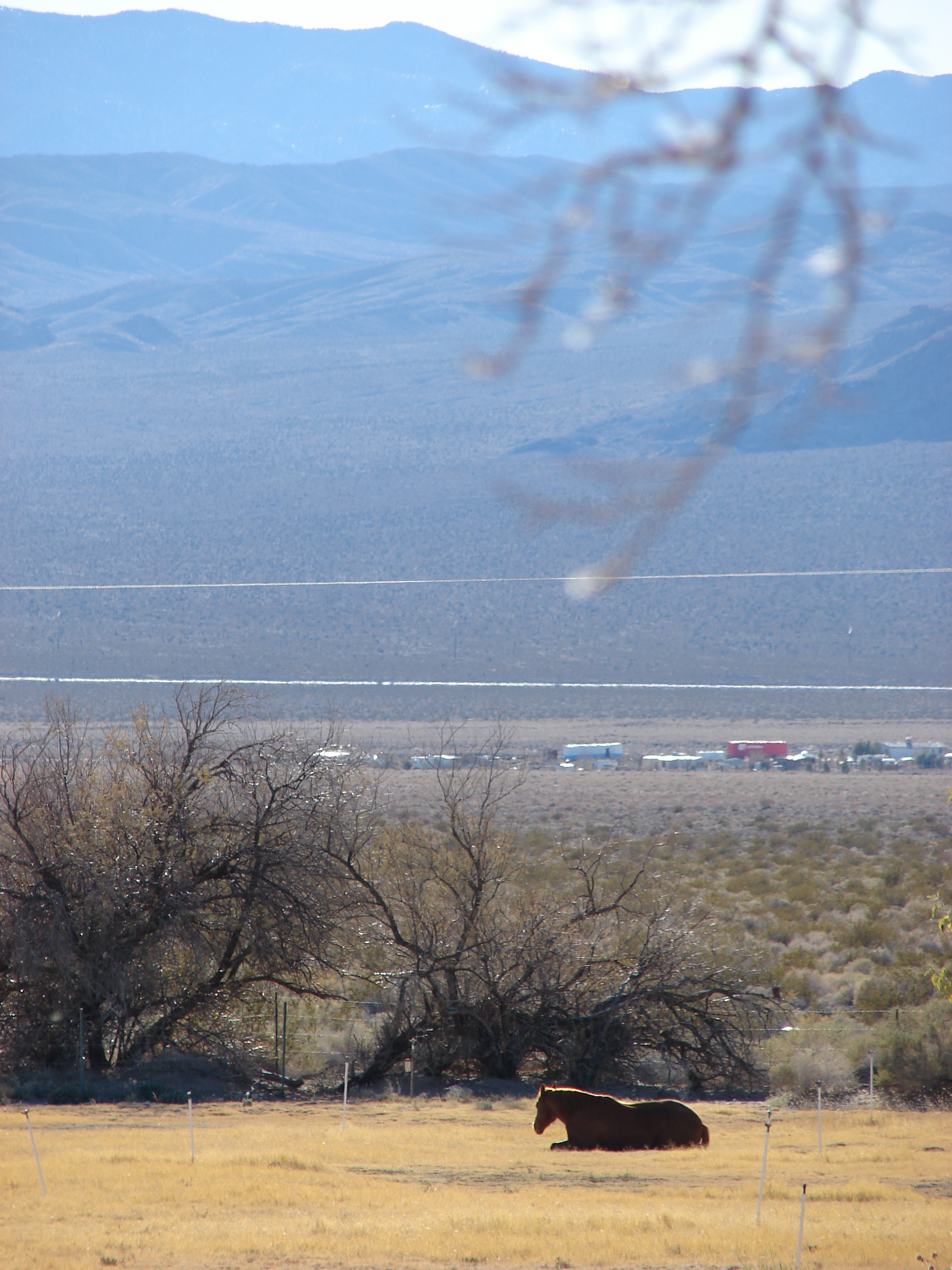
- Corn Creek, Nevada

- Location within Nevada Location within the United States
- Coordinates: 36°25′15″N 115°22′54″W
- Country: United States
- State: Nevada
- County: Clark
- Named after: Corn Creek
- Elevation: 2,850 ft (870 m)
- Time zone: UTC-8 (Pacific (PST))
  - Summer (DST): UTC-7 (PDT)
- ZIP code: 89124
- Area codes: 702/725
- GNIS feature ID: 859284

Corn Creek is an unincorporated community in Clark County, Nevada, United States. The community is located along the former Las Vegas and Tonopah Railroad where it had a station. It is approximately 7.5 miles from the Las Vegas city limits by road and is situated south of the Desert National Wildlife Refuge border and bordered to the west, south, and east with the Tule Springs Fossil Beds National Monument.

Corn Creek is an off-the-grid community, relying on power from propane tanks and solar panels.

== Geography ==
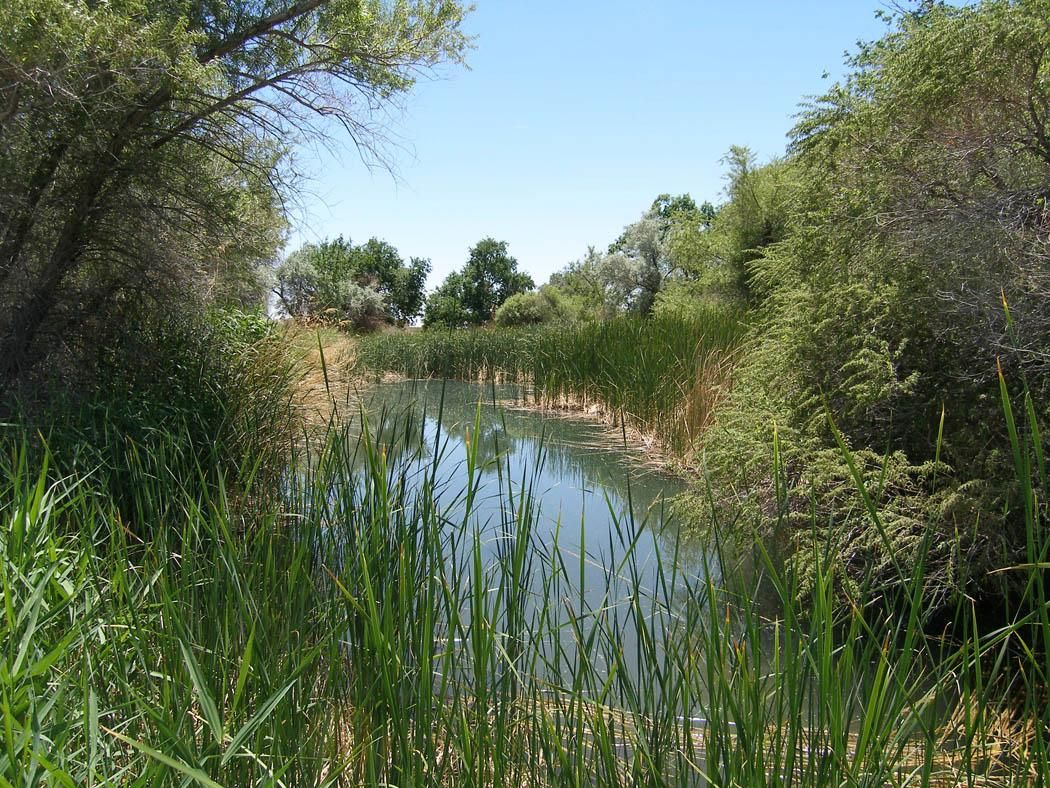
Corn Creek Springs

Corn Creek lies on the Las Vegas Wash at an elevation of 2,854 ft (870 m). Visible in the east are the Sheep Range and Fossil Ridge, Castle Rock, and Gass Peak of the Las Vegas Range. To the west are the Spring Mountains.

=== Climate ===
Corn Creek has a cool desert climate (Köppen BWk).

Climate data for Desert National Wildlife Refuge, Nevada, 1991–2020 normals, extremes 1940–present
Month	Jan	Feb	Mar	Apr	May	Jun	Jul	Aug	Sep	Oct	Nov	Dec	Year
Record high °F (°C)	83 (28)	87 (31)	96 (36)	98 (37)	108 (42)	113 (45)	117 (47)	114 (46)	109 (43)	100 (38)	94 (34)	81 (27)	117 (47)
Mean maximum °F (°C)	68.9 (20.5)	72.2 (22.3)	81.7 (27.6)	90.9 (32.7)	99.0 (37.2)	107.0 (41.7)	110.8 (43.8)	108.2 (42.3)	102.4 (39.1)	92.9 (33.8)	79.9 (26.6)	68.1 (20.1)	111.4 (44.1)
Mean daily maximum °F (°C)	56.8 (13.8)	60.5 (15.8)	68.0 (20.0)	75.5 (24.2)	85.3 (29.6)	96.1 (35.6)	101.2 (38.4)	99.5 (37.5)	92.0 (33.3)	79.0 (26.1)	65.5 (18.6)	55.6 (13.1)	77.9 (25.5)
Daily mean °F (°C)	43.8 (6.6)	47.0 (8.3)	53.6 (12.0)	60.0 (15.6)	69.1 (20.6)	78.5 (25.8)	84.4 (29.1)	82.8 (28.2)	75.0 (23.9)	62.6 (17.0)	50.8 (10.4)	42.8 (6.0)	62.5 (16.9)
Mean daily minimum °F (°C)	30.8 (−0.7)	33.6 (0.9)	39.1 (3.9)	44.6 (7.0)	52.9 (11.6)	60.9 (16.1)	67.6 (19.8)	66.0 (18.9)	58.1 (14.5)	46.2 (7.9)	36.0 (2.2)	30.0 (−1.1)	47.2 (8.4)
Mean minimum °F (°C)	20.9 (−6.2)	24.0 (−4.4)	29.3 (−1.5)	34.8 (1.6)	42.3 (5.7)	50.7 (10.4)	58.5 (14.7)	57.2 (14.0)	48.1 (8.9)	35.8 (2.1)	25.4 (−3.7)	20.5 (−6.4)	18.0 (−7.8)
Record low °F (°C)	0 (−18)	10 (−12)	17 (−8)	23 (−5)	30 (−1)	36 (2)	43 (6)	43 (6)	38 (3)	19 (−7)	16 (−9)	3 (−16)	0 (−18)
Average precipitation inches (mm)	0.58 (15)	0.80 (20)	0.62 (16)	0.25 (6.4)	0.17 (4.3)	0.08 (2.0)	0.46 (12)	0.28 (7.1)	0.26 (6.6)	0.40 (10)	0.27 (6.9)	0.44 (11)	4.61 (117)
Average snowfall inches (cm)	trace	0.1 (0.25)	0.0 (0.0)	0.0 (0.0)	0.0 (0.0)	0.0 (0.0)	0.0 (0.0)	0.0 (0.0)	0.0 (0.0)	0.0 (0.0)	0.0 (0.0)	0.2 (0.51)	0.3 (0.76)
Average precipitation days (≥ 0.01 in)	3.0	3.7	2.7	1.8	1.2	0.5	2.6	2.0	1.3	1.7	1.4	2.4	24.3
Average snowy days (≥ 0.1 in)	0.1	0.1	0.0	0.0	0.0	0.0	0.0	0.0	0.0	0.0	0.0	0.1	0.3
Source: NOAA

== Recreation ==
To the northeast up Corn Creek Road is Corn Creek Campsite and the Desert National Wildlife Refuge visitor center and parking lot. Trails and dirt roads from the visitor center provide access to the Sheep Range and Las Vegas Range and Tule Springs Fossil Beds National Monument located further south closer to Las Vegas.

== Corn Creek Road ==
Corn Creek Road is a roughly 4-mile paved road that provides access to the community via Landy Street and the DNWR visitor center and Corn Creek Campsite from U.S. Route 95. The road has a 45 mph speed limit. The western half is located in the Tule Springs Fossil Beds National Monument and the eastern half in the Desert National Wildlife Refuge.

At the end of the road, Alamo Road and Mormon Well Road are accessible as well as Gass Peak Road which spurs off Mormon Well Road further into the wildlife refuge.

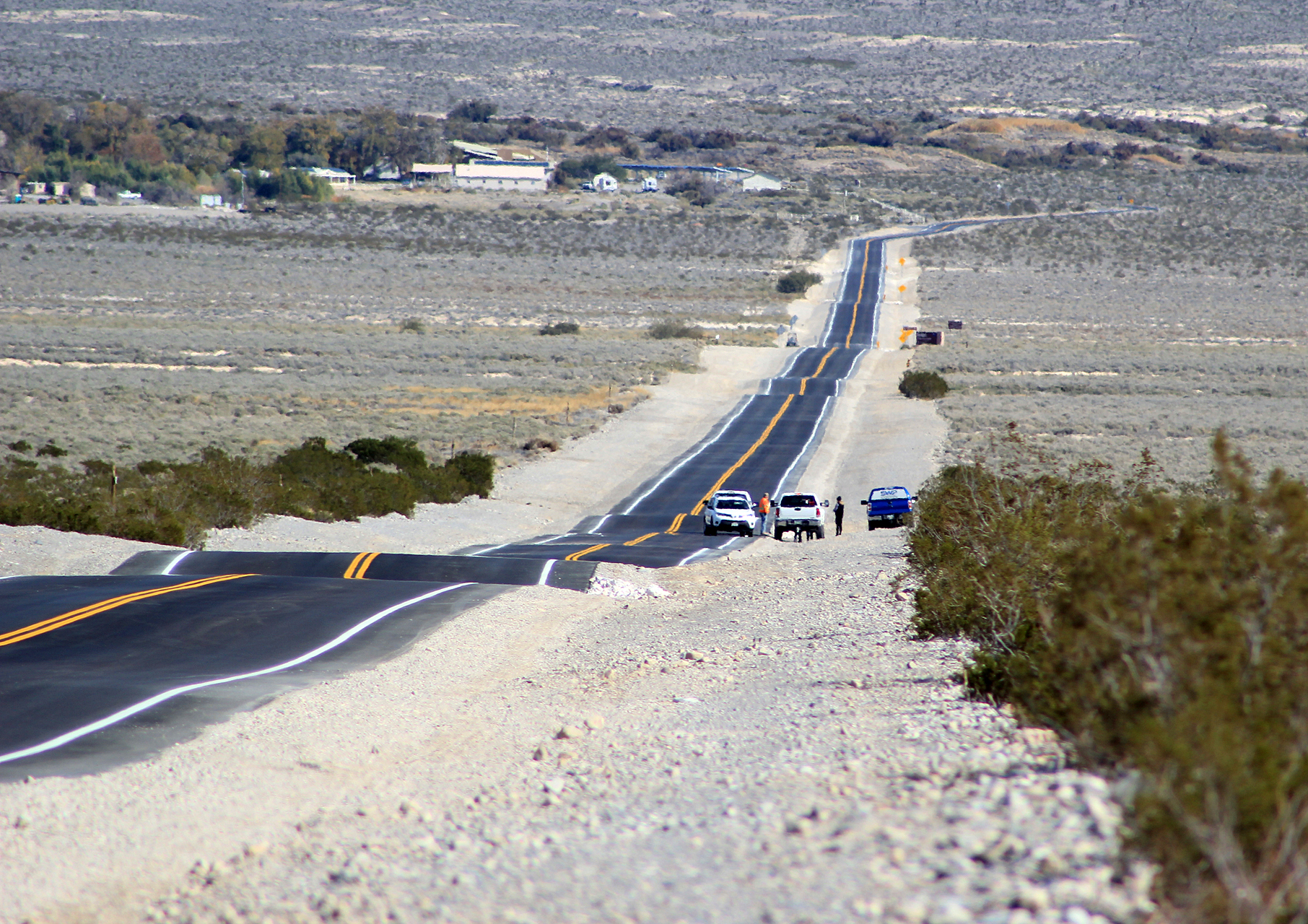
Corn Creek Road looking east near U.S. Route 95

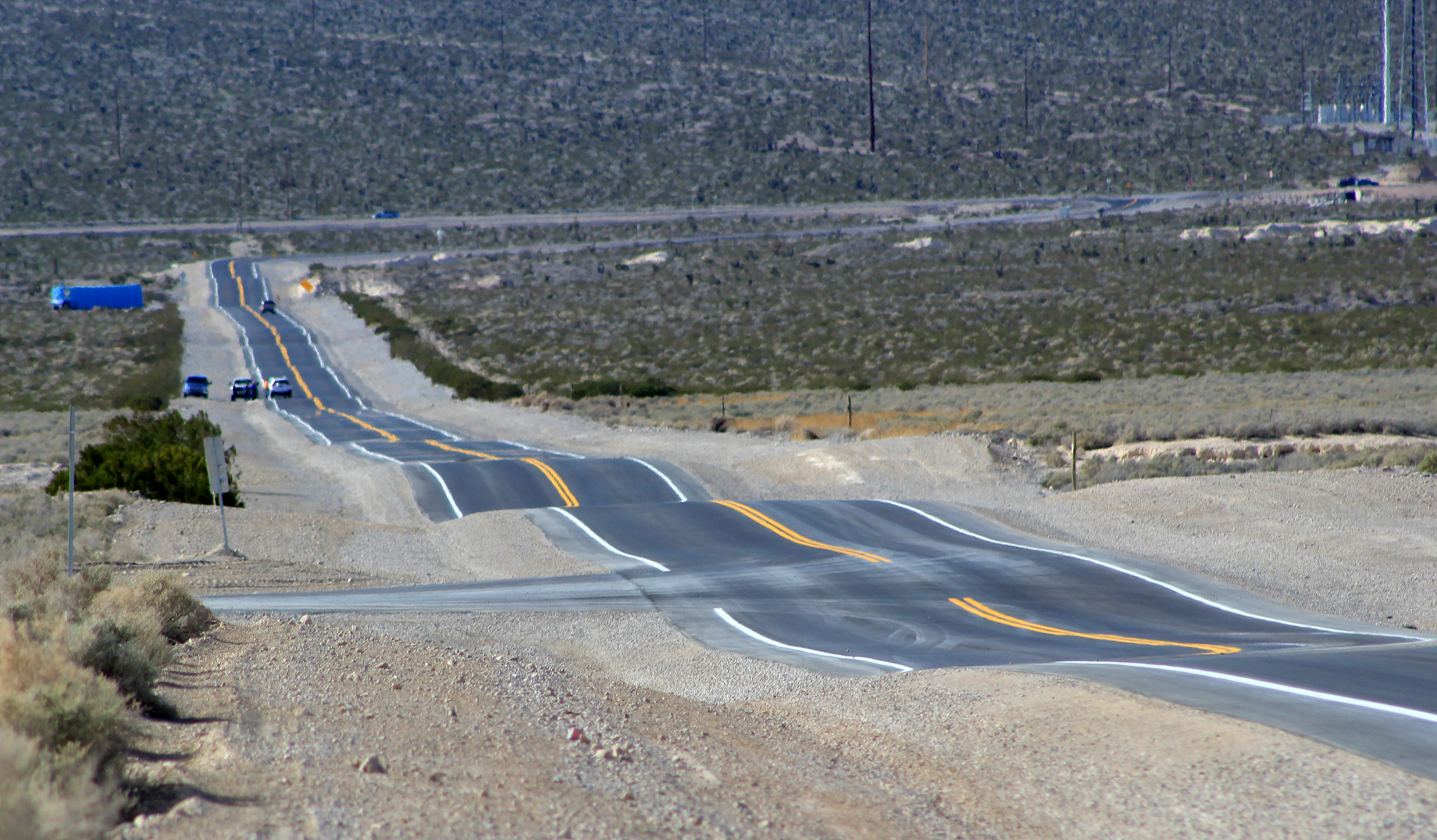
Corn Creek Road looking west near Landy Street

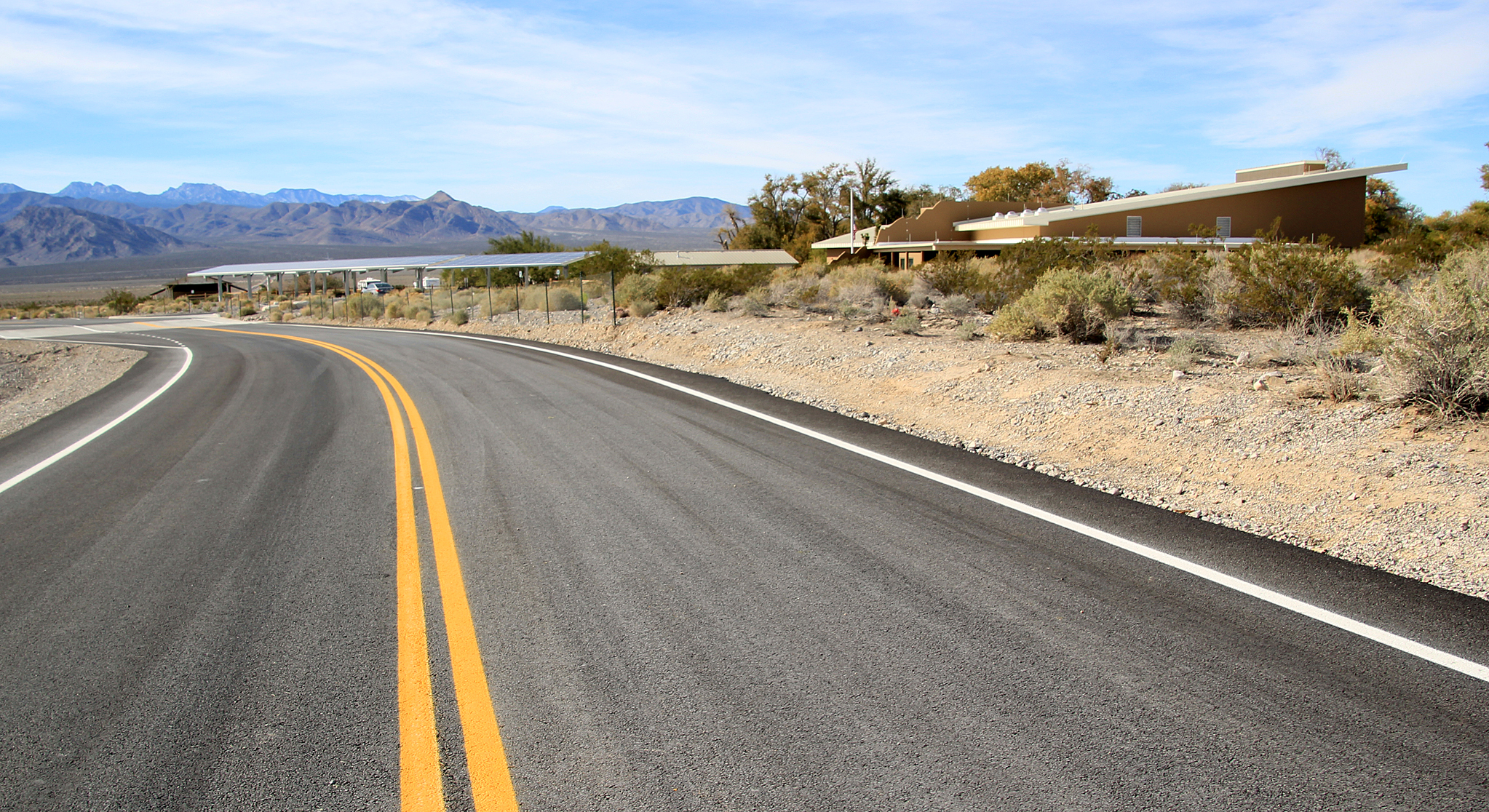
Corn Creek Road looking west near the visitor center

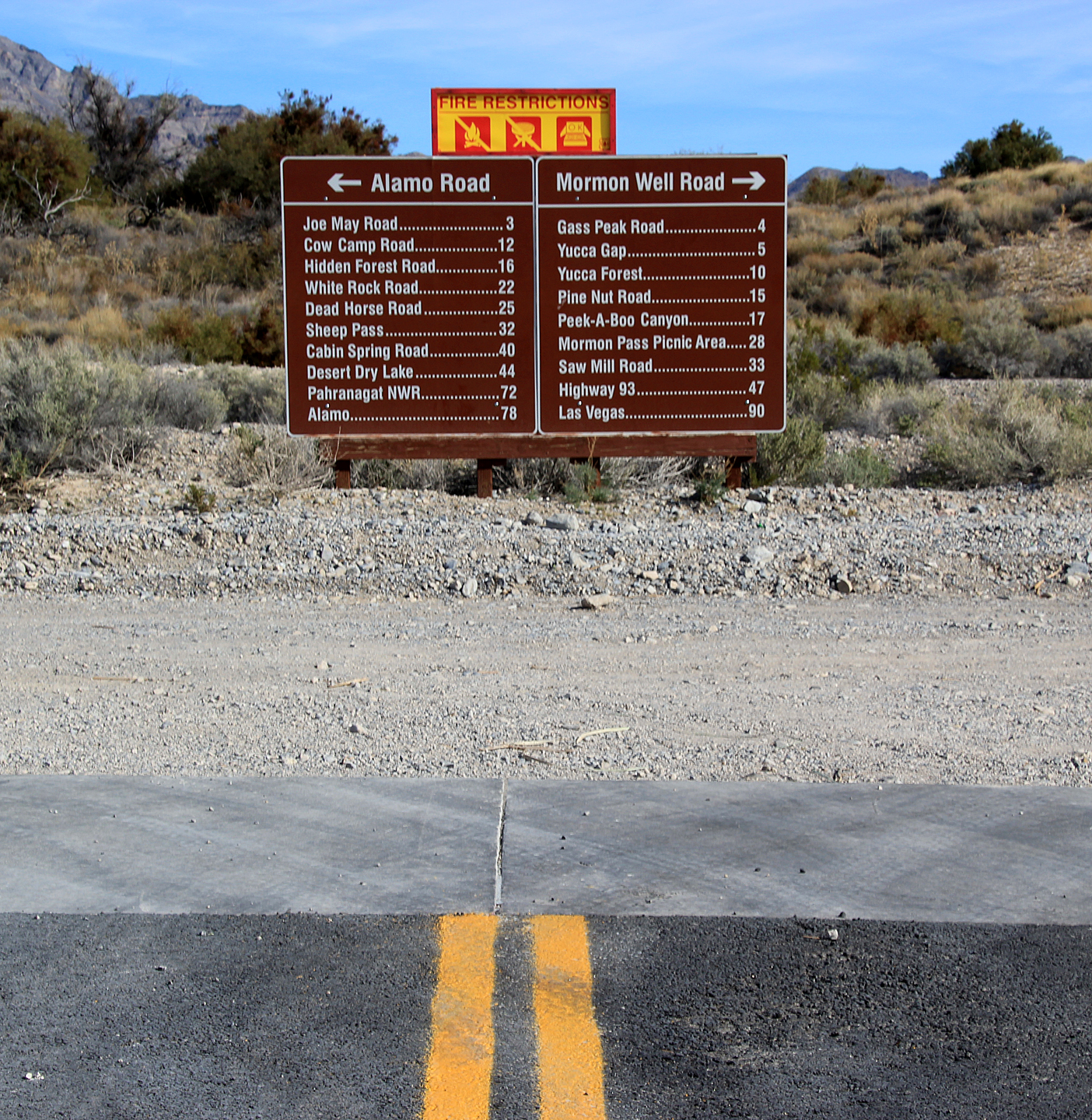
Eastern end of Corn Creek Road at its junction with Alamo Road
