= Sevier orogeny =

Mountain-building episode in North America

Geography of Sevier Orogeny
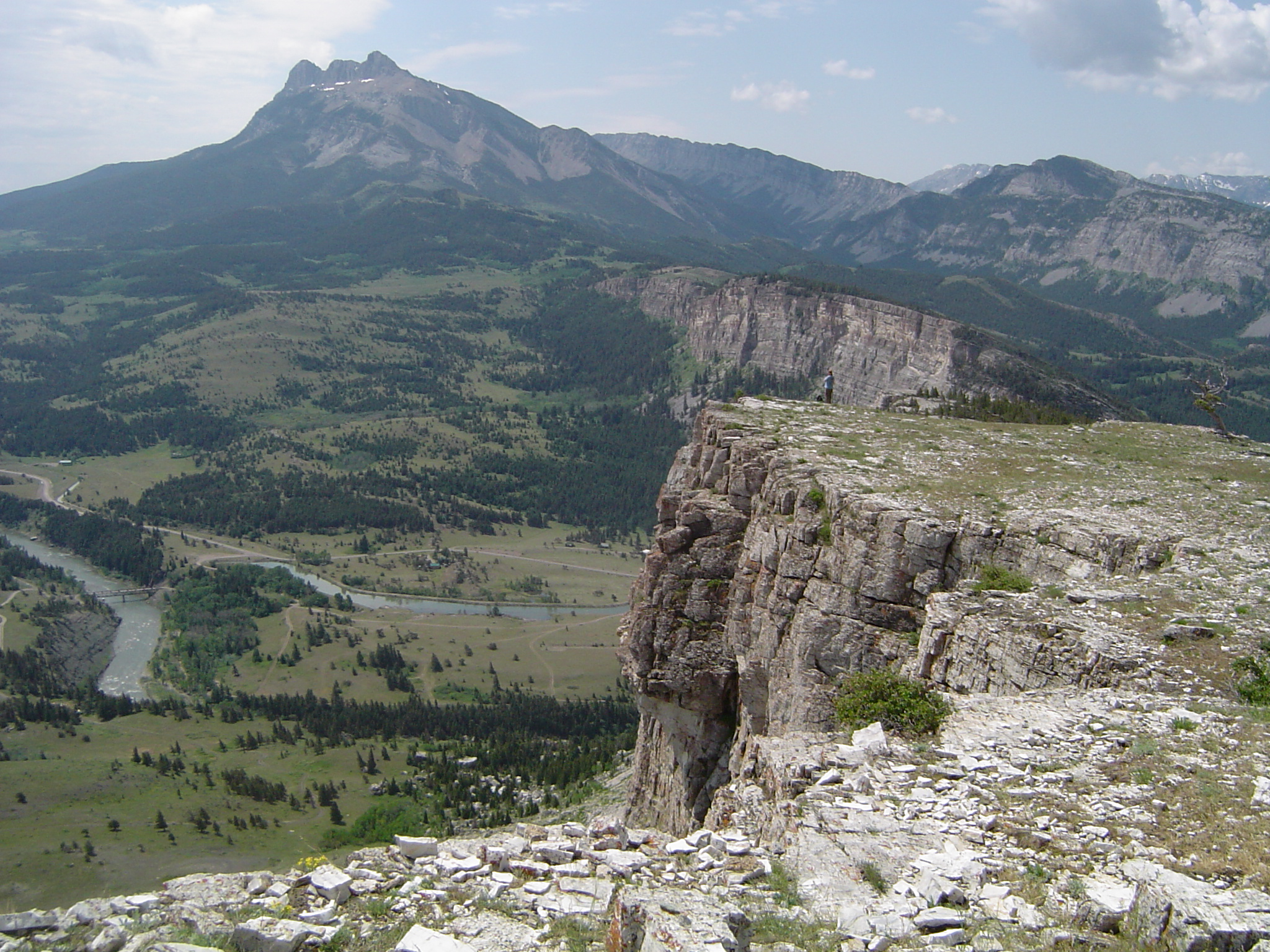
- An example of thin-skinned thrusting in Montana where the white Madison Limestone is repeated, with one occurrence in the foreground (that pinches out with distance) and another to the upper right corner and top of the photo.
- Continent: North America
- Borders: United States and Canada

The Sevier orogeny was a mountain-building event that affected western North America from northern Canada to the north to Mexico to the south.

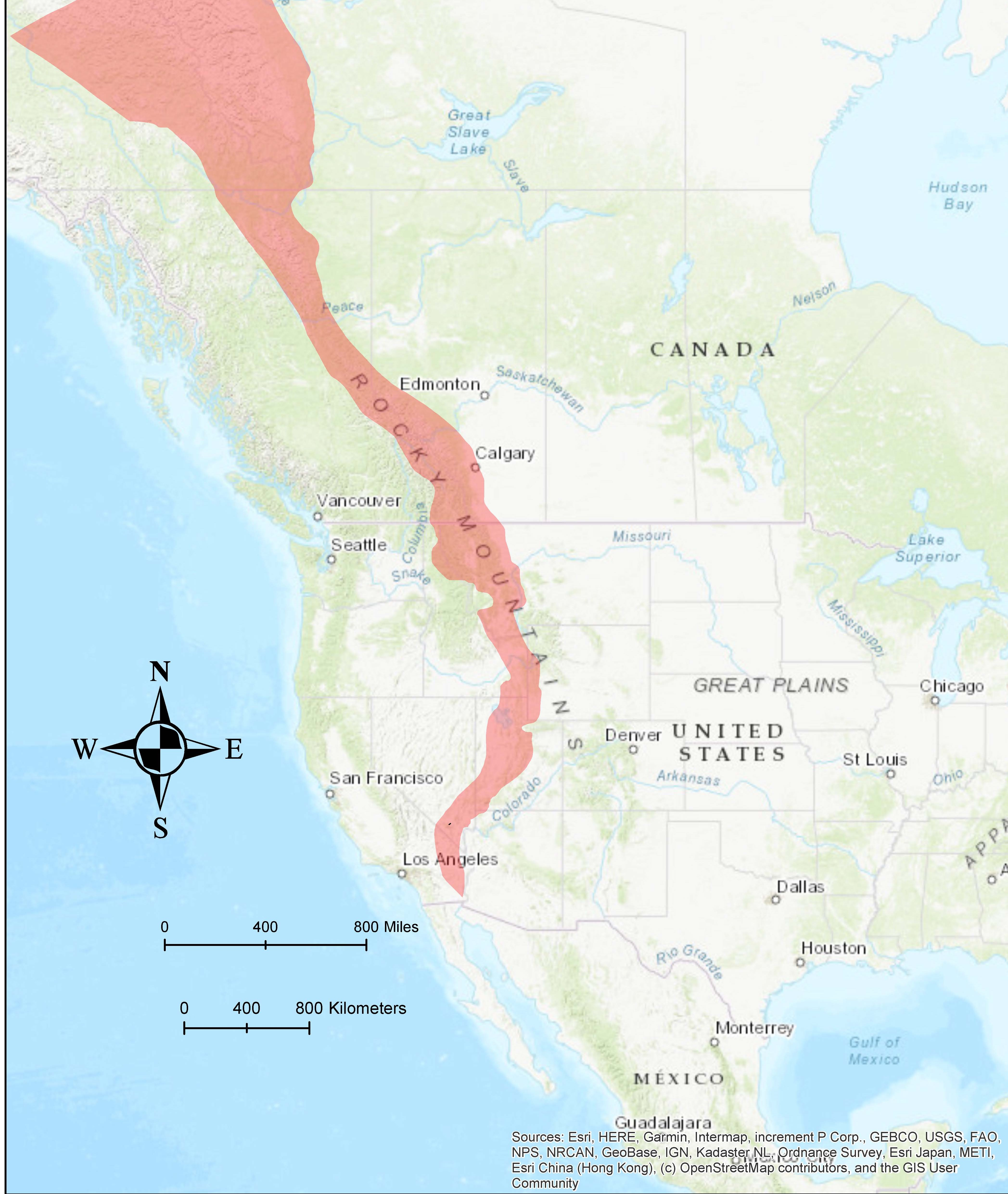
Location of the Sevier Fold and Thrust Belt (highlighted in red). After Yonkee and Weil (2015).

The Sevier orogeny was the result of convergent boundary tectonic activity, and deformation occurred from approximately 160 million years (Ma) ago to around 50 Ma. This orogeny was caused by the subduction of the oceanic Farallon Plate underneath the continental North American Plate. Crustal thickening that led to mountain building was caused by a combination of compressive forces and conductive heating initiated by subduction, which led to deformation. The Sevier River area of central Utah is the namesake of this event.

== Extent ==
The Sevier Fold and Thrust Belt extends from southern California near the Mexican border to Canada. Basin and Range faults cut the older Sevier thrust faults. The Sevier orogeny was preceded by several other mountain-building events including the Nevadan orogeny, the Sonoman orogeny, and the Antler orogeny, and partially overlapped in time and space with the Laramide orogeny.

== Sevier or Laramide? ==
Early Sevier thrusting began well before initial Laramide deformation. However, there is evidence that suggests late Sevier faults were active during the early Laramide. The majority of Sevier deformation occurred west of Laramide deformation, but there is some geographic overlap between the eastern Sevier margin and the western Laramide margin. In southwestern Utah, Sevier thrusts may have remained active until the Eocene, while Laramide deformation began in the Late Cretaceous.

Since the Sevier and Laramide orogenies occurred at similar times and places, they are sometimes confused. In general the Sevier orogeny defines an older, more western compressional event that took advantage of weak bedding planes in overlying Paleozoic and Mesozoic sedimentary rock. As the crust was shortened, pressure was transferred eastward along the weak sedimentary layers, producing “thin-skinned” thrust faults that generally get younger to the east. In contrast, the Laramide orogeny produced “basement-cored” uplifts that often took advantage of pre-existing faults that formed during rifting in the late Precambrian during the breakup of the supercontinent Rodinia or during the Ancestral Rocky Mountains orogeny.

== Geologic structures ==
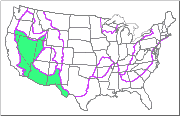
Map from U.S.G.S. showing the Basin and Range Province in the United States. Basin and Range includes the western portion of Utah, essentially all of Nevada - the central heart of the Great Basin itself - bits of southern Oregon and Idaho, southern Arizona, New Mexico and far west Texas, and the eastern fringe and southeastern desert region of California. It also extends into Baja California and other areas of northwestern Mexico.

The Sevier orogenic belt consisted of a series of thin plates along gently dipping west thrust sheets and moving from west to east. These thin skinned thrusts moved late Precambrian to Mesozoic age rock of the Cordilleran passive margin east. The Sevier meets the Laramide orogenic belt on its eastern side. The Sevier and Laramide combination is similar to the modern day Andean margin in Chile. They are comparable because the younger Laramide faults and structures were a geometric response to the shallow dipping Sevier thrusts.

The location of the eastern edge of the Sevier orogeny was determined by conglomerates largely made up of boulders that would have been shed from the eastern and steepest edge of the rising mountains. Such conglomerates can be seen throughout Utah in Echo Canyon, the Red Narrows in Spanish Fork Canyon, and in Leamington Canyon near Delta, Utah. Today Sevier faults at the surface have been broken up and tilted steeply from their original gently dipping positions due to the extension of the Basin and Range faulting. The earliest thrusts of the Sevier are located furthest west with each newer thrust cutting the older thrust. This pattern caused the older thrusts to ride on top of the younger thrusts as they moved eastward. The Paris-Willard thrust in Utah was determined to be the oldest thrust in the series using this pattern. The youngest thrust is the Hogback in Wyoming.

The Sevier thrust belt in Utah can be divided in two, north of Salt Lake City and South of Salt Lake City. The thrusts to the north are much better understood because oil and gas are often associated with them. The northern portion runs through present day Utah, Idaho, and Wyoming. The southern portion stops around Las Vegas. The total crustal shortening of the northern portion was roughly 60 miles.

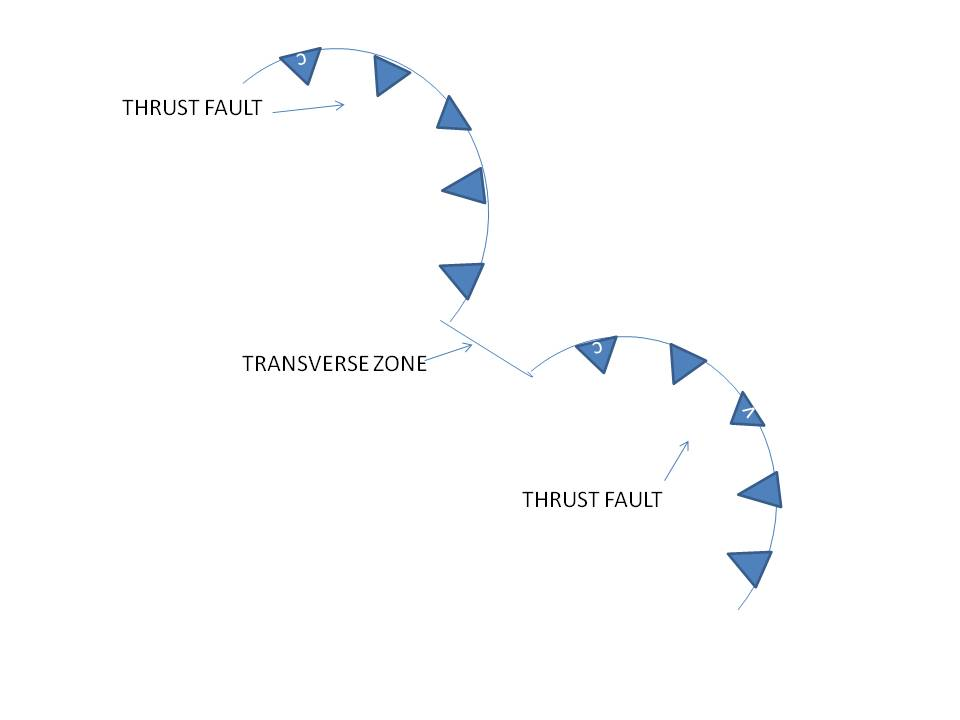
This is a diagram showing how transverse zones often connect thrust faults in a fold and thrust belt.

The Sevier belt left behind many distinctive geologic features in the Wyoming and Utah region, namely recesses and salients. Transverse zones can accompany thrust faults connecting the segments of the belt. One such zone is the Charleston transverse zone linking the Provo salient to the southern arm of the Uinta/Cottonwood arch. Although the Uinta/Cottonwood arch is a Laramide structure the Sevier helped the arch form. Another important zone is the Mount Raymond transverse zone connecting the Wyoming salient and the northern arm of the arch.

While continental margins are typically the most deformed in orogenic events, the interior of continental plates can also deform. In the Sevier-Laramide orogenic events evidence for interior plate deformation includes folds, cleavage and joint fabrics, distorted fossils, persistent faulting, and calcite twinning.

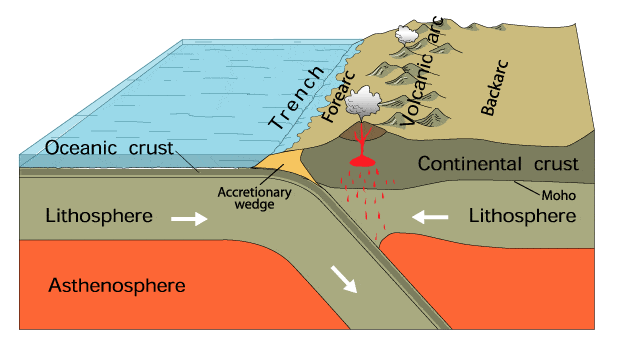
This is a cross section of a typical ocean–continent subduction zone, showing the major geologic features that accompanied the Sevier orogeny.

== How and when ==
The Sevier fold and thrust belt was active from late Jurassic (201 - 145 Mya) through Eocene (56 - 34 Mya) time. The actual age of initiation of the belt is not entirely agreed upon by researchers. However, Sevier deformation had begun by the Jurassic.

Deformation in the southern portion of the Sevier fold and thrust belt began around 160 Ma. Strain was transferred eastward to the Keystone thrust by 99 Ma. In northern Utah, the Willard thrust sheet was emplaced around 120 Ma. Strain was progressively transferred to the Hogsback Thrust in western Wyoming. Faults near the leading edge of the Sevier remained active until at least the Eocene.

At this time the elevated crust ran into the Colorado Plateau. The collision resulted in lateral spreading of deformation and led to a weakened lithosphere and crustal thickening. Metamorphism due to the crustal heating and thickening is prevalent between 90 and 70 Ma in the present Great Basin region.

== Studies ==
=== Transverse zones and the Uinta recess ===
Parallel thrust faults and folds make up a fold-thrust belt on a regional scale. At the local scale segments of the belt are connected by transverse zones. The Charleston transverse zone mentioned earlier runs perpendicular to the thrust faults within the Sevier belt. It has been debated among geologists if this transverse zone developed during the Sevier orogeny or the Uinta/Cottonwood arch formation during the Laramide orogeny. Mapping Sevier thrusting in the Basin and Range Province suggests Sevier structures curve around the Uinta/Cottonwood arch defining the Uinta recess. Looking closely at Sevier faults in American Fork Canyon indicate that these faults are the oldest in the Charleston transverse zone suggested by cross cutting relationships observed in the area.

The Basin and Range Province extending across Nevada, into western Utah, and south into Mexico now consists of N-S normal faulting due to crustal extension. If these normal faults show any extension in late Eocene to early Miocene, this could be evidence the Sevier orogenic event collapsing after deactivation. Thickening of the crust due to Sevier and Laramide faulting is thought to have led to current Basin and Range extension throughout the Cenozoic. This could have caused the Charleston thrust fault to reactivate as an extensional fault. The Charleston transverse zone contained high angle faults which suggests it initiated as a response to connecting the low angle thrust faults of the Sevier. The Charleston transverse zone outlines a main sidewall ramp that would have been part of the Sevier belt.

To the north of the Uinta/Cottonwood arch during the Sevier orogeny there was a basement high area gently dipping to the north identified by isopach maps. Thus sediment thickened quickly to the south. To the north strata changed gradually throughout the thrust and a gradual curve developed around the Wyoming salient and to the south around the Provo salient. The Charleston and Mount Raymond transverse zones formed the Uinta recess indicating the recess was initiated during the Sevier orogeny.

The results were interpreted to support the Charleston transverse zone forming during the Sevier orogeny to accommodate geometric changes along strike of the thrusts. The zone served as a linking tool of the various segments of the orogeny. The transverse zone varied throughout the region in terms of depth and displacement. The zone was later tilted and was reactivated through crustal extension. Results also support the Uinta recess forming during the Sevier orogeny due to similar geometric crustal accommodation. Displacement on Sevier aged thrust faults caused the shaping of the curvature of the Uinta recess prior to uplift of the Uinta/Cottonwood arch.

=== Related thrust belts ===
Focusing on the southern portion of the Sevier thrust belt many thrust faults can be found. One thrust system is known as the Garden Valley thrust system in the central Nevada thrust belt. Thrusts within this system include the Pahranagat, Mount Irish, and Golden Gate thrusts. These thrusts were correlated with the southward Gass Peak thrust. The Gass Peak thrust is located in the Las Vegas Range and is a Sevier age structure. This thrust may have been responsible for the largest slip of the major belt along that latitude. These thrusts were located all along the same strike. This region showed small scale extension in the Cenozoic due to reactivation of the thrusts. Such a correlation suggests that the Garden Valley thrust system has a direct link to the Sevier thrust belt. The interpretation of this data led to the central Nevada thrust belt as being an interior section of the Sevier. This correlation provides evidence that the Sevier thrust belt was a result of compression moving eastward through the North American plate.

=== Cordilleran and Sevier orogenesis relationships ===
Thinning of the Cordilleran has previously been thought to be evidence and reason for flat subduction in the Sevier and Laramide orogenic events. However, isotopic data suggests that preservation of Cordilleran lithosphere implies Cordilleran thinning is not a sufficient answer for Sevier and Laramide flat subduction. This implies thinning and shearing of the Cordilleran was confined to the fore-arc region. Data suggests throughout the Sevier-Laramide thrusting the crust was also uplifted and extended. The modern Chilean subduction is thought to be a parallel model of the Sevier and Laramide events so there are possibly answers to this question in this modern model. Explanations may include a combination of plate motion rates increasing, the underriding oceanic plate becoming younger as the older portion subducts, and thus the underriding plate being hotter and more buoyant.

=== Crustal shortening ===
A study on calcite twinning and carbonate relationships with the Sevier orogenic belt showed that shortening directions were parallel to the thrust faulting, which was an E-W direction. Differential stress magnitudes determined from calcite twinning showed a decreasing trend exponentially toward the craton. Differential stresses causing compressional deformation in the Sevier thrust were greater than 150 MPa. The E-W contraction during the Sevier changed to roughly N-S oblique during the Laramide orogenic event. Sevier shortening has been recorded throughout much of the western United States as far east as Minnesota in the Cretaceous Greenhorn Limestone as preserved by calcite twinning. The distance of stress transfer is roughly equivalent to more than 2000 km. The E-W shortening shown in calcite twinning of the Sevier is parallel to today's principal stresses in the western interior of the North American plate.

== Sevier volcanism ==
Voluminous volcanism is also associated with the Sevier Orogeny. Volcanic activity can be observed at modern subduction zones, (such as along the west coast of South America) like the one that caused the Sevier Orogeny. Several volcanic flare-ups occurred in the Sierra Nevada arc, associated with the Sevier Orogeny: one from 170 Ma to 150 Ma, and one from 100 Ma to 85 Ma. Volcanic centers migrated generally eastward during the progression of the Sevier and the transition to Laramide deformation, and by the late Cretaceous volcanism related to Farallon Plate subduction could be found as far east as the Colorado Mineral Belt, east of the leading edge of the Sevier fold and thrust belt.

== Foreland sedimentation ==
As Sevier thrust faults were uplifted, thrust sheet erosion occurred; those eroded sediments were then deposited where accommodation space existed. Dynamic subsidence and flexure due to crustal loading created space where sediments could accumulate. As the Sevier thrusting migrated eastward, the sedimentary basins also migrated eastward. Balanced cross-sections show that significant erosion of this Sevier-age synorogenic sediment has occurred.

== See also ==
- Basin and range topography
- Geology of the Rocky Mountains
