= Gass Peak =

Mountain in Nevada, United States

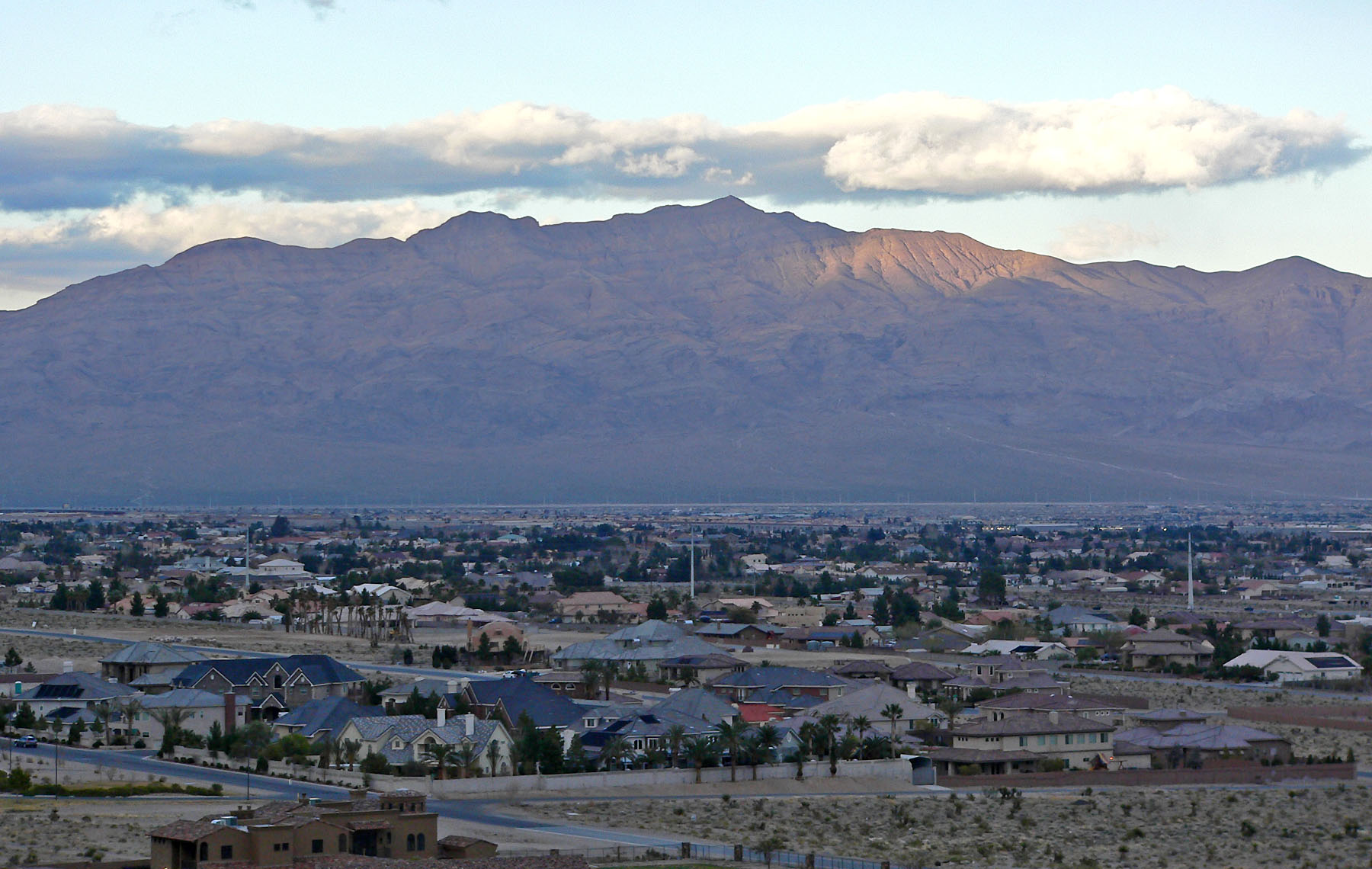
- Gass Peak from Las Vegas

Highest point
- Elevation: 6,937 ft (2,114 m)
- Prominence: 2,043 ft (623 m)
- Coordinates: 36°24′02″N 115°10′50″W

Geography
- Location: Clark County, Nevada, U.S.
- Parent range: Las Vegas Range
- Topo map: USGS Gass Peak

Gass Peak is the highest peak in the Las Vegas Range of Southern Nevada with a summit of 6,937 feet (2,114 m). It is easily seen to the north of the Las Vegas Valley, bordering the city of North Las Vegas. The peak is located about 20 miles (32 km) north of Las Vegas and is within the Desert National Wildlife Refuge, administered by the U.S. Fish & Wildlife Service.

A communications tower with solar panels has been built at the top of the peak.

== Etymology ==
Gass Peak is named for Octavius Decatur Gass (1828–1924), an early settler and prominent rancher of Las Vegas.

== History ==
On November 26, 2019, a Cirrus SR22 crashed into the summit of Gass Peak, and all three passengers aboard the plane were killed. Recovery efforts were initiated the following day, but due to poor weather conditions they were called off. It was later determined that the cause of the accident was due to the pilot's inability to see the peak during sunset; when the crash occurred.

== Hiking and recreation ==
Gass Peak is accessible by the public and the most common access is via Corn Creek Road off U.S. Route 95, northwest of Las Vegas, then to the Mormon Well Road and Gass Peak Road dirt roads. Campsites and parking corrals are located along the roads and at trailheads. Hiking trails are not maintained. On the peak, mountains in Nye County, Lincoln County, Utah, Arizona, and California are all visible in the distance.

== Gallery ==
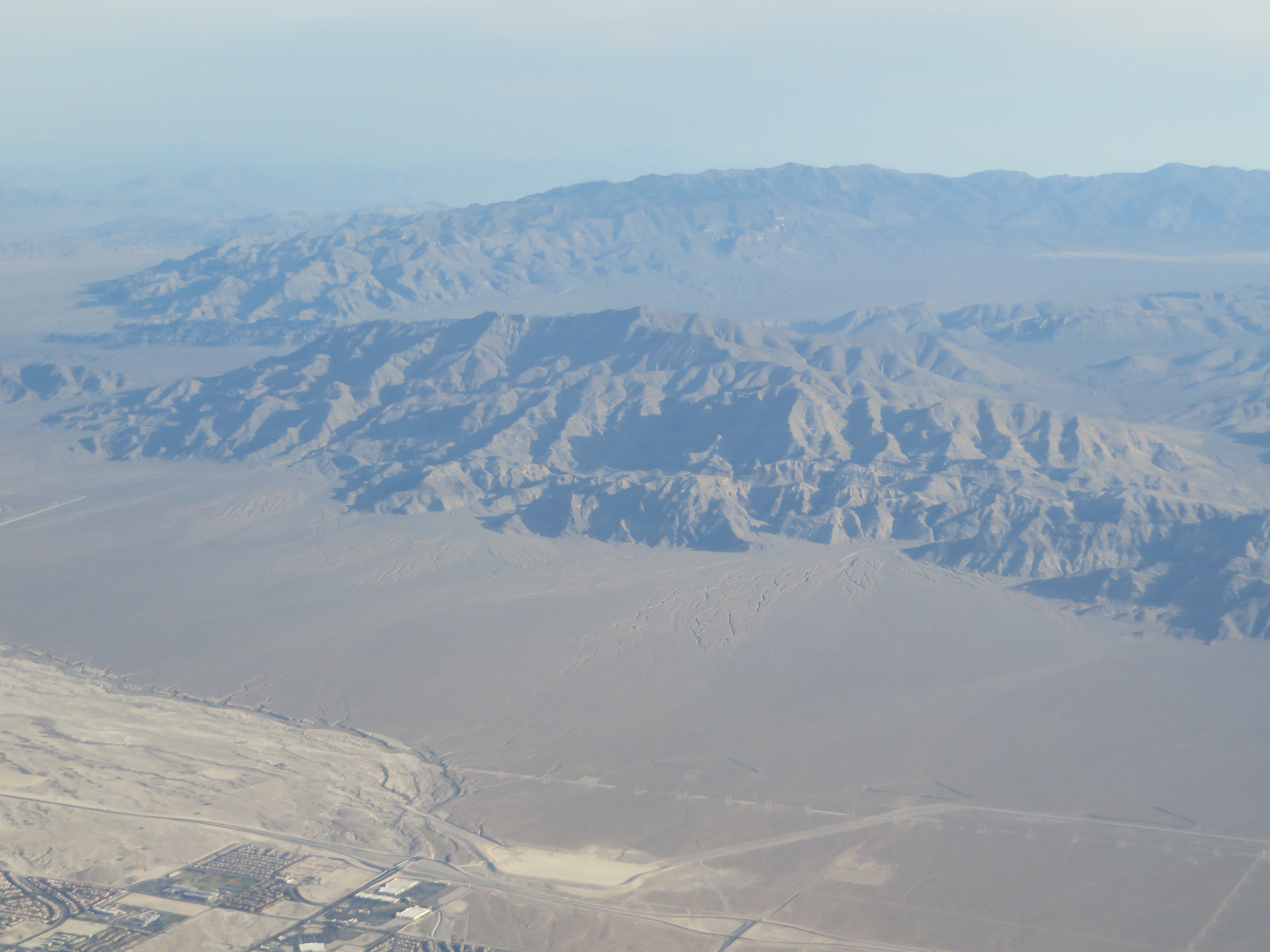
Gass Peak viewed from above

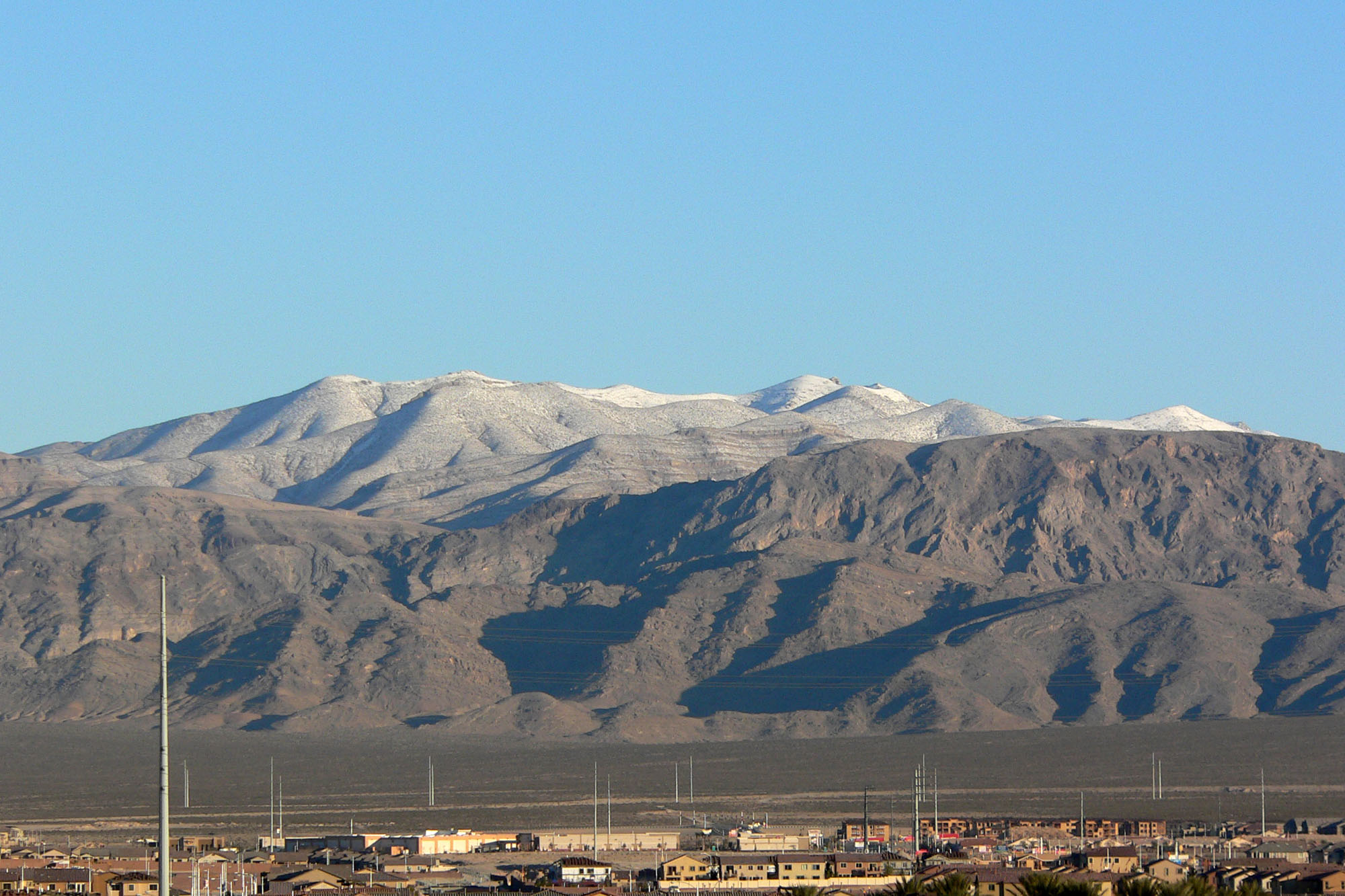
Gass Peak covered in snow

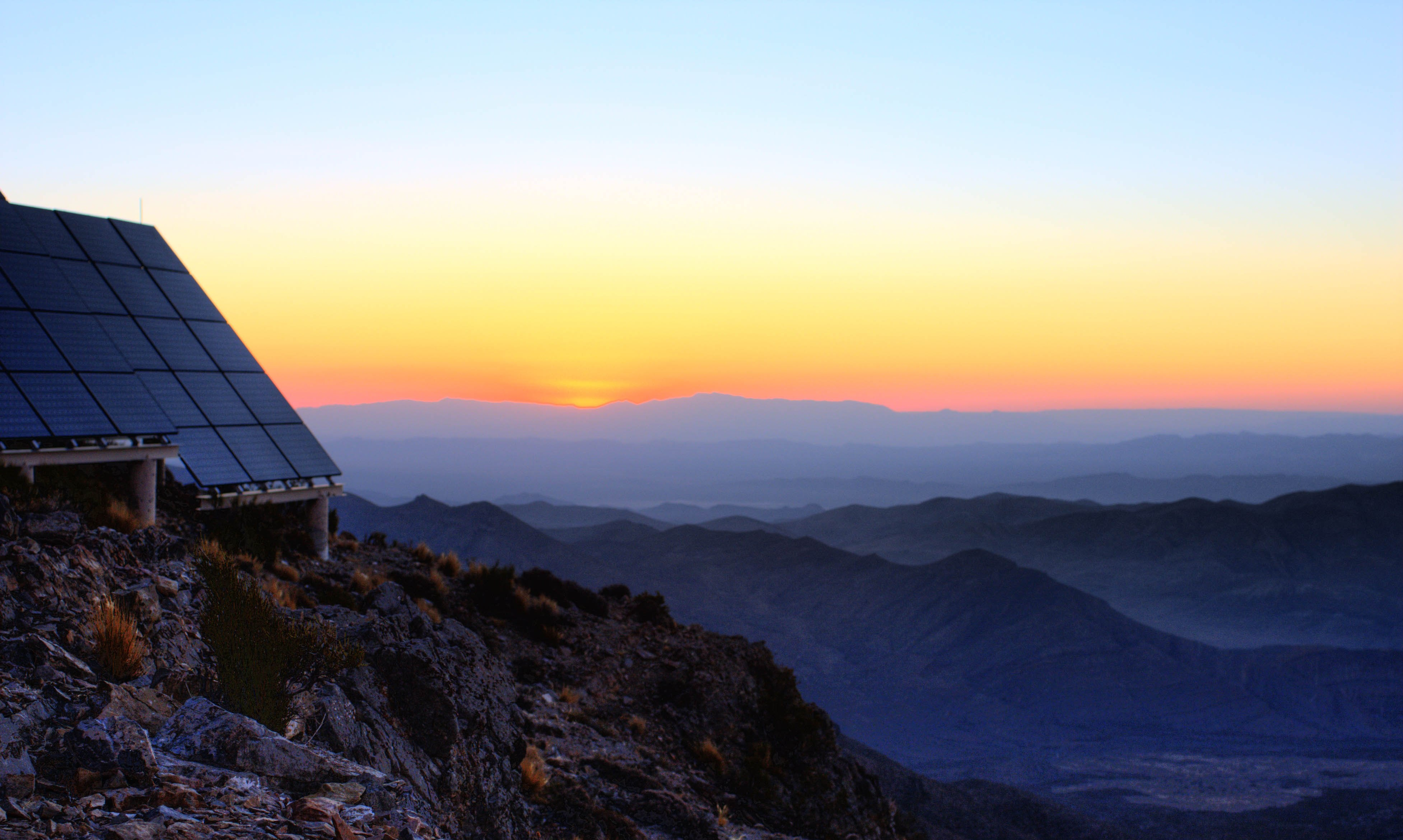
Sunrise viewed looking east atop Gass Peak

== See also ==
- Tule Springs Fossil Beds National Monument
