= Corn Creek Campsite =

- U.S. National Register of Historic Places
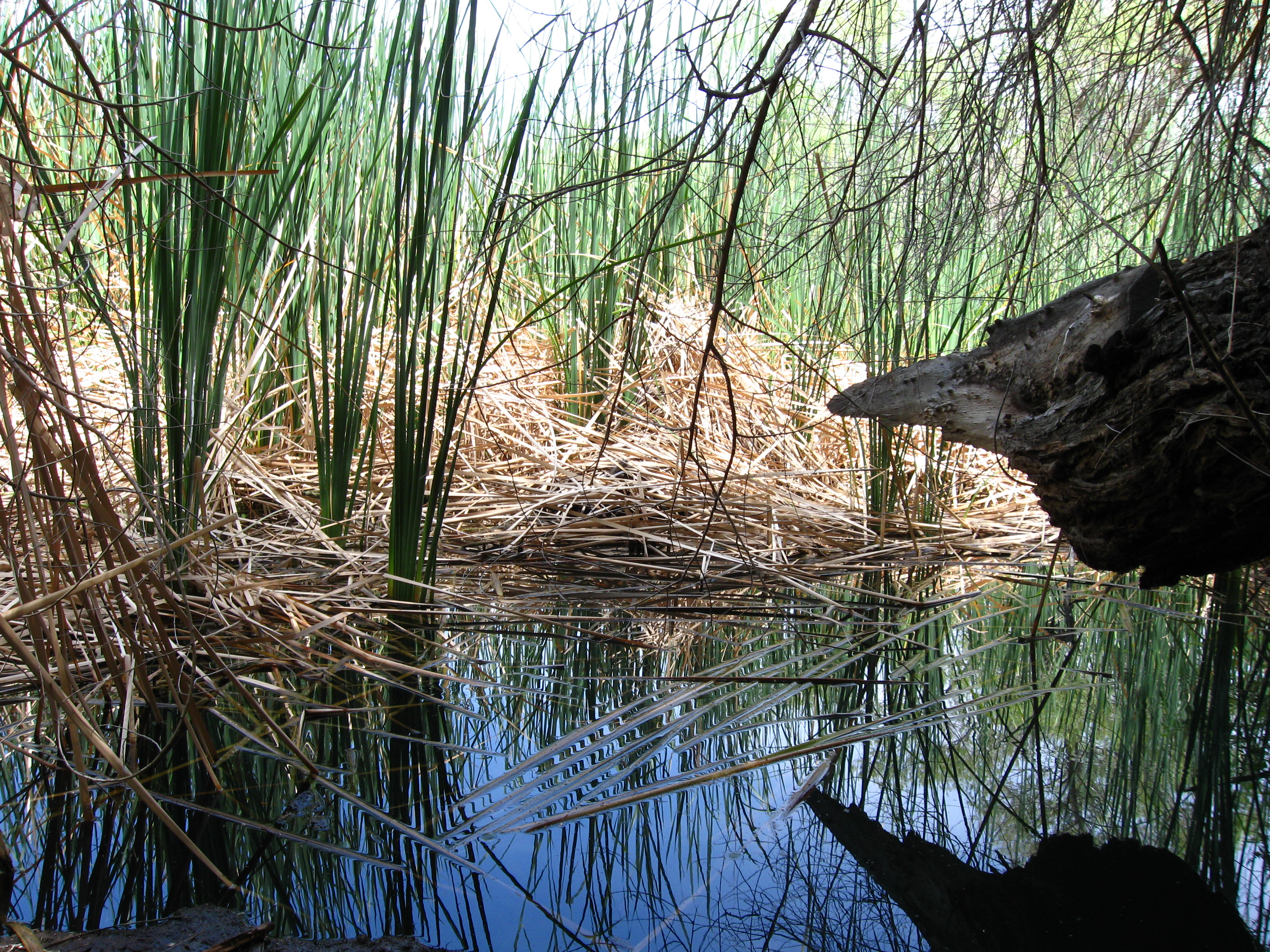
- Nearest city: Las Vegas, Nevada
- NRHP reference No.: 75001105
- Added to NRHP: March 4, 1975

Corn Creek Campsite is located in the Desert National Wildlife Range and was used from around 1900–1924 for ranching and is listed on the United States National Register of Historic Places. Nearby is Mormon Well Spring another listed historic place.

The site was discovered by the archaeologist Bertha Parker in 1930 when she spotted fossil camel bone weathering out of a lake bed deposit. At the time, she was participating in the excavations at nearby Gypsum Cave.

Many visitors are attracted to the bird watching opportunities, namely the LeConte's and crissal thrashers. They are attracted to the creosote in the region which is among the densest and most intact within Clark County.

== History ==
The site had indications of other use dating back to 5000 BC.

The site was listed on the National Register of Historic Places on March 4, 1975.

The proposed Yucca Mountain rail line is not expected to impact this site.
