= Volcán Bárcena =

Island volcano in Mexico

Barcena
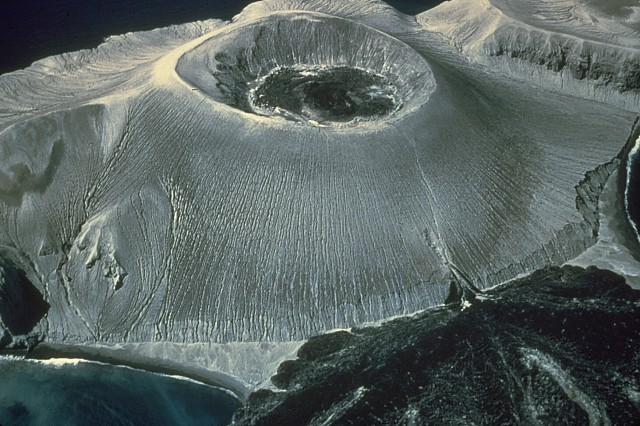
- Barcena cinder cone

Highest point
- Elevation: 332 m (1,089 ft)
- Listing: List of volcanoes in Mexico
- Coordinates: 19°18′29″N 110°48′24″W

Geography
- Location within Mexico
- Location: San Benedicto Island, Mexico

Geology
- Mountain type: Cinder cone
- Volcanic belt: Trans-Mexican Volcanic Belt
- Last eruption: 1952 to 1953

The Bárcena volcano is an active but not currently erupting cinder cone type volcano that encompasses the southern end of the San Benedicto Island, Mexico. It is grouped with a chain of volcanic islands known as the Revillagigedo Islands. These islands are situated in close proximity to each other, and can be found in the Pacific Ocean. They are also considered to be part of the Trans-Mexican Volcanic Belt. Volcán Bárcena is positioned 220 miles (350 kilometers) off the south-eastern coast of the Baja California peninsula. The closest city to Barcena is Cabo San Lucas, Mexico.

== Eruption/Creation ==
The Volcan Barcena was created by a series of eruptions that started on 1 August 1952. The first eruption took place in the early morning, and was rated at a 3.0 on the volcanic scale. This eruption spewed immense amounts of ash and rock. The eruption is responsible for the formation of the base of the volcano and the overall extension of the island, the second eruption is responsible for the formation of a large crater inside of the volcanic cone, and the third has been widely accepted as the cause of lava discharge throughout the island. The series of eruptions that created the volcano came to an end less than seven months later. At its peak, the Barcena Volcano reaches a height of 1,090 feet (330 meters).

=== San Benedicto rock wren ===
On 1 August 1952, lava fountains started to break out of the Boquerón vent, located in a rift between the two older volcano cones. By around 8:45, ejecta were thrown up for several km in a severe vulcanian eruption of magnitude 3 on the Volcanic Explosivity Index scale; pyroclastic flows rolled over the island.

Two weeks later, the entire island was covered in ash and pumice up to 3 m (10 ft) deep. Bárcena crater, 332 m (1,089 ft) high, rose where the wren's habitat had previously existed. The birds were never seen again.

The San Benedicto rock wren was the only endemic terrestrial bird on San Benedicto, and it was one of two landbirds on San Benedicto, sharing the island with western ravens, which were wiped out by the eruption as well. Unlike many species that have become extinct in modern times, humans were not responsible for the San Benedicto Rock Wren's extinction.
