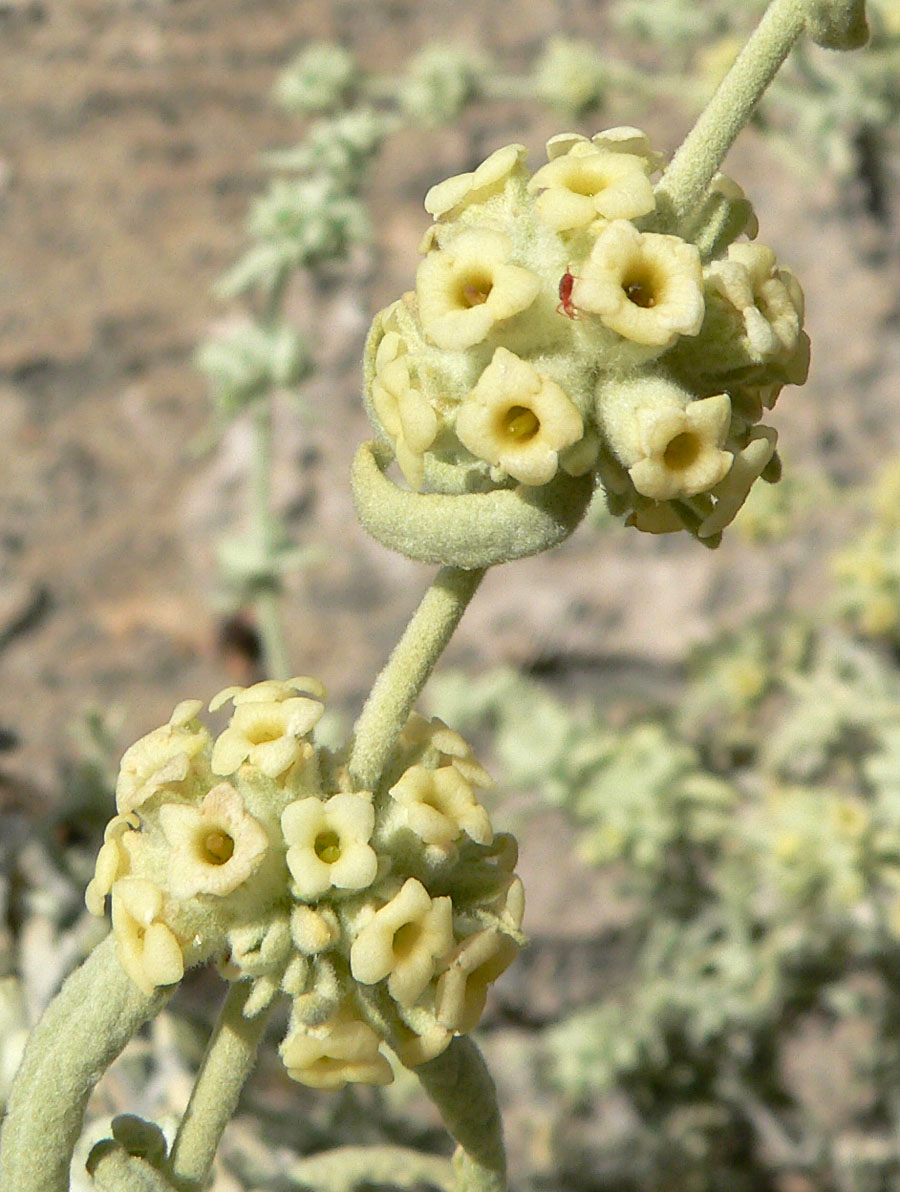

Conservation status
- Apparently Secure (NatureServe)

Scientific classification
- Kingdom: Plantae
- Clade: Tracheophytes
- Clade: Angiosperms
- Clade: Eudicots
- Clade: Asterids
- Order: Lamiales
- Family: Scrophulariaceae
- Genus: Buddleja
- Species: B. utahensis

Binomial name
- Buddleja utahensis Coville

= Buddleja utahensis =

Species of flowering plant

Buddleja utahensis is a species of Buddleja endemic to the southwestern United States (northwest Arizona, eastern California, southern Nevada, and southwestern Utah), where it is known by the common names Utah butterfly bush and Panamint butterfly bush. Named and described by Coville in 1892, the shrub favours limestone outcrops at elevations of 700–2,000 m (2,300–6,560 ft), where it is often found in association with Joshua trees.

== Description ==
Buddleja utahensis is a compact, dwarf dioecious shrub reaching 0.3–1.0 m (1 ft 0 in – 3 ft 3 in) in height. The bark is rimose and greyish, while the plant structure is characterized by persistent naked twigs. The younger branches are terete, bearing subsessile linear to oblong leaves 1.5–3.5 cm (0.59–1.38 in) long by 0.3–0.5 cm (0.12–0.20 in) wide, rounded at the apex and attenuate at the base. Both surfaces of the leaves are densely short tomentose, bestowing a silver-grey appearance. The inflorescences are 4–12 cm (1.6–4.7 in) long, with 3–7 pairs of heads forming verticals, subtended by leafy bracts. The verticels are 0.5–1.13 cm (0.20–0.44 in) in diameter, each comprising 15–30 pale yellow flowers, the corollas 4–5 mm long. Capsules are up to 2.5 mm long, with numerous globose seeds up to 0.4 mm in diameter.

== Cultivation ==
Buddleja utahensis is very rare in cultivation; it is a difficult plant to raise in temperate regions, demanding very free draining soil and infrequent watering. Hardiness: USDA zone 8.
