= Las Vegas Range =

Mountain range in Nevada, United States

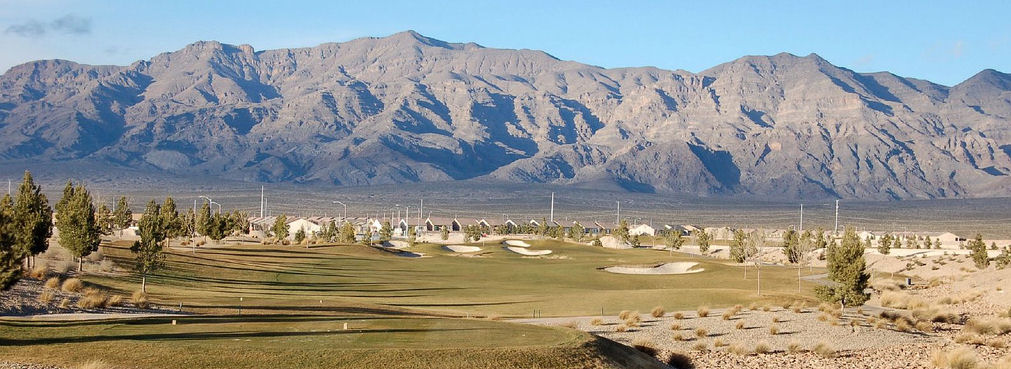
- Southern massif of Las Vegas Range visible highpoint: Gass Peak, left-center

Highest point
- Peak: Gass Peak
- Elevation: 6,937 ft (2,114 m)

Geography
- Location within Nevada
- Country: United States
- State: Nevada
- County: Clark County
- City: North Las Vegas (northern border)
- Range coordinates: 36°34′16.882″N 115°2′11.026″W
- Borders on: Arrow Canyon Range; Sheep Range
- Topo map: USGS Hayford Peak SE

The Las Vegas Range is an arid mountain range in Clark County, Nevada. The range is located in the southeast of the Desert National Wildlife Refuge.

== Geography ==
The Las Vegas Range is a north–south range, with two main north–south ridgelines. The highpoint of the range, Gass Peak, is in the south massif above the Las Vegas Valley.

The southern portion of the Las Vegas Range has the linear ridgelines ending at the massif at the south, defining the northern Las Vegas Valley metropolitan area, including the city of North Las Vegas.

Region

The range is on the southeast of the Sheep Range, which itself is a massive north–south range. Both ranges are Basin and Range block faulted.

To the east is another north–south Arrow Canyon Range. The U.S. Route 93 highway runs between the two ranges, and travels along the border of the Desert National Wildlife Refuge to the west.

== See also ==
- List of landforms of the Nellis & Wildlife 5 Ranges region
