= Tule Springs Fossil Beds National Monument =

United States National Monument

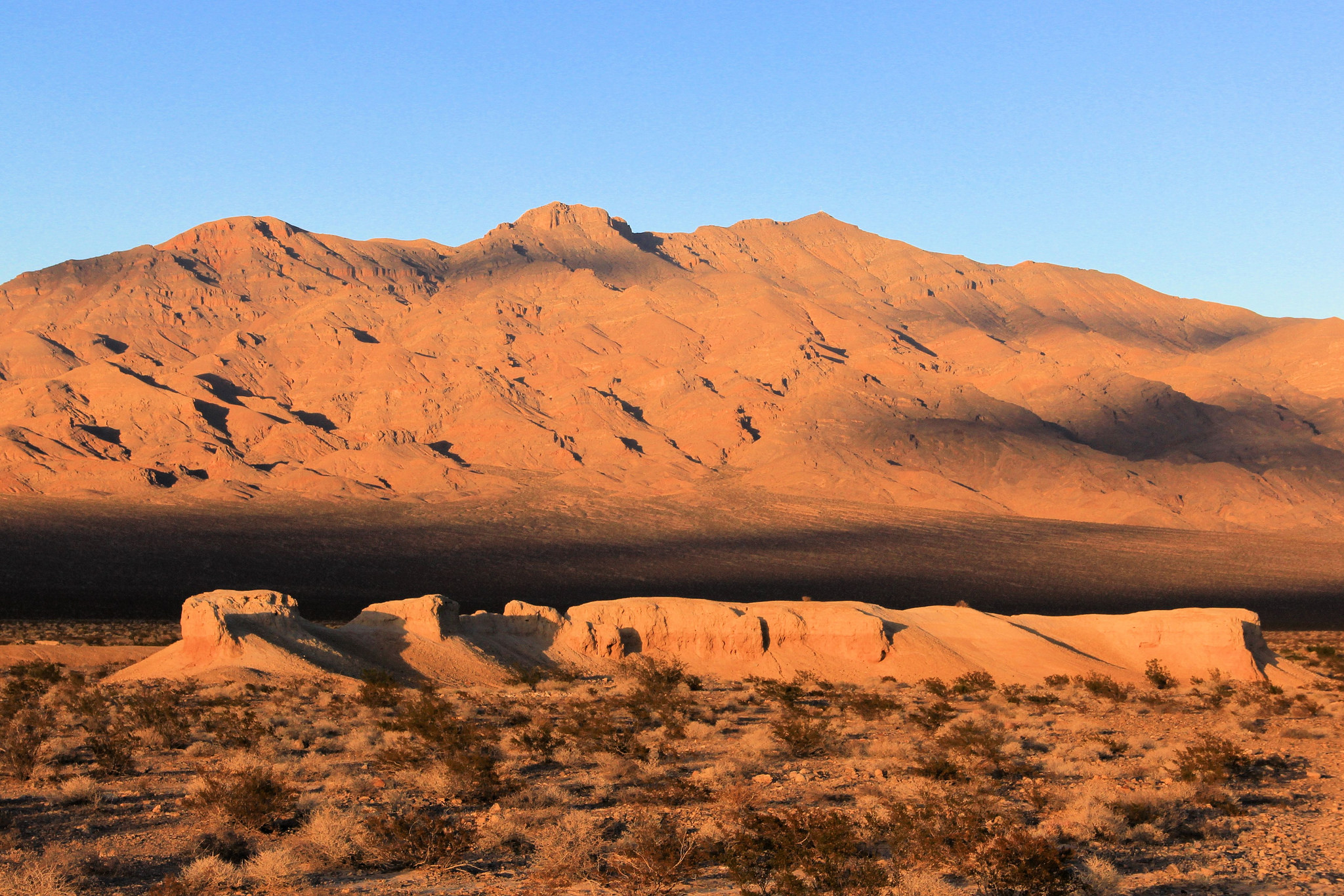
- A part of the fossil beds with Gass Peak in the background

- Location within Nevada Location within the United States
- Interactive map of Tule Springs Fossil Beds National Monument
- Nearest city: Las Vegas, Nevada
- Coordinates: 36.371°N 115.306°W
- Area: 22,650 acres (9,170 ha)
- Established: 2014
- Visitors: 51,964 (in 2025)
- Governing body: National Park Service
- Website: Tule Springs Fossil Beds National Monument

Tule Springs Fossil Beds National Monument, a United States National Monument near Las Vegas, Clark County, Nevada, was established in 2014 to protect Ice Age paleontological discoveries. The 22,650-acre (9,170 ha) monument is administered by the National Park Service.

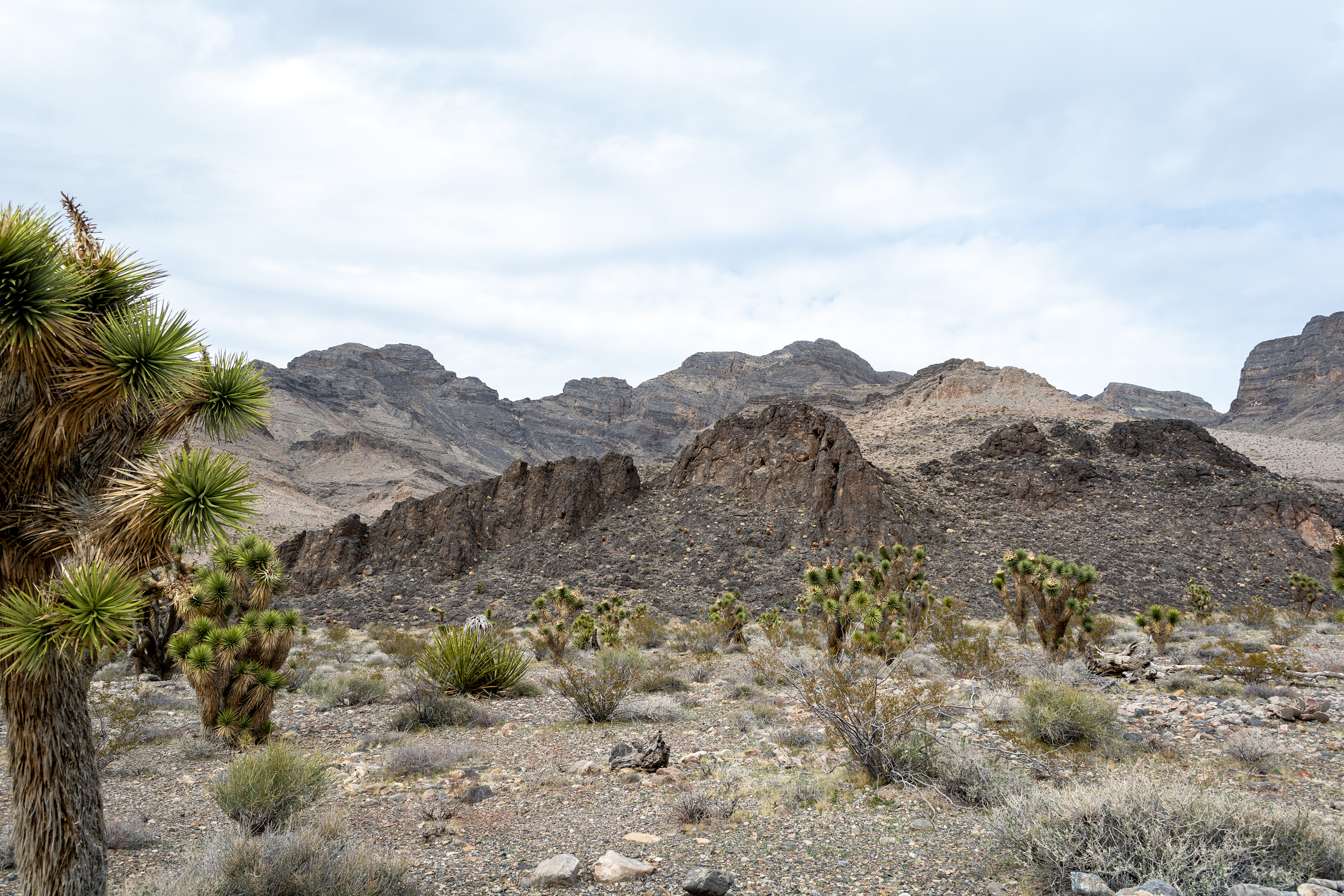
Joshua trees at Tule Springs Fossil Beds NM

The national monument is located in the Upper Las Vegas Wash and protects part of the Tule Springs. The wash area also includes several patches of the rare Las Vegas bear poppy. The land was designated after a local campaign to permanently protect the landscape as a national monument.

== Paleontology ==
Paleontology studies began at Tule Springs in 1933 when the bones of a Columbian mammoth were discovered by quarry workers. Other fossils found at the site include Camelops, ground sloth, dire wolf, Teratornis, Smilodon Fatalis and American lion, and range from 7,000 to 250,000 years old.

== Legislation ==
The Tule Springs Fossil Beds passed both houses of Congress in December 2014 and signed into law by President Barack Obama on December 19, 2014, under Section 3092(a) of the National Defense Authorization Act for 2015.

== Hiking and trails ==
The Tule Springs Fossil Beds have two official and temporary trails. One is the Tule Springs loop, a flat 1.7-mile loop around the first fossil bed, and the second is the Tule Springs long loop, a 2.3-mile loop around the entire fossil bed, which has the hiker climbing over the fossil bed. These trails are accessible at the north end of N. Durango Drive.

== See also ==
- List of national monuments of the United States
