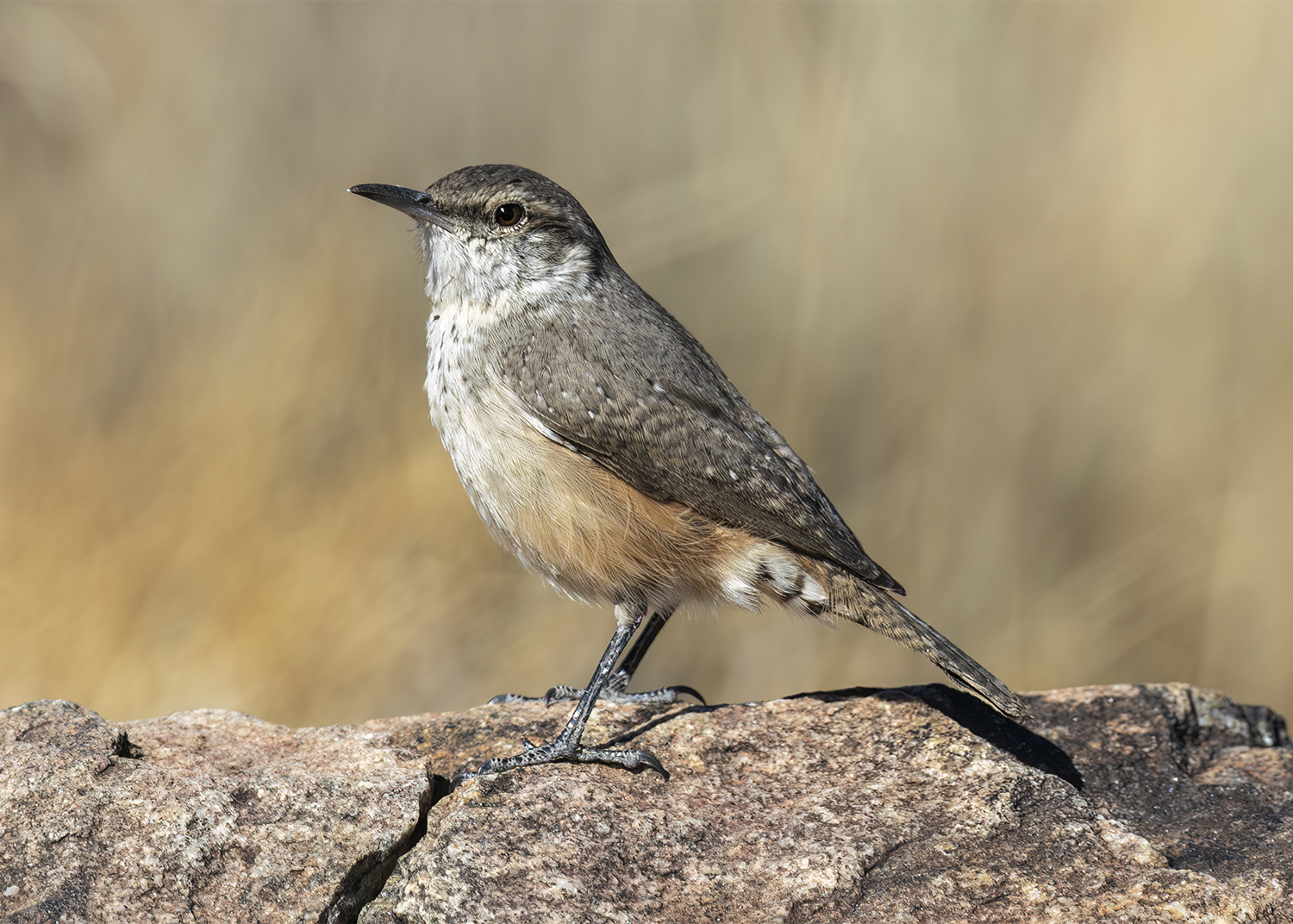

Conservation status
- Least Concern (IUCN 3.1)

Scientific classification
- Kingdom: Animalia
- Phylum: Chordata
- Class: Aves
- Order: Passeriformes
- Family: Troglodytidae
- Genus: Salpinctes; Cabanis, 1847
- Species: S. obsoletus

Binomial name
- Salpinctes obsoletus (Say, 1822)

Subspecies
- S. o. obsoletus (Say, 1822); S. o. guadeloupensis (Ridgway, 1876); S. o. tenuirostris (van Rossem, 1943); S. o. exsul (Ridgway, 1903); S. o. neglectus (Nelson, 1897); S. o. guttatus (Salvin and Godman, 1891); S. o. fasciatus (Salvin and Godman, 1891); S. o. costaricensis (van Rossem, 1941)
- Breeding Migration Year-round Nonbreeding

Synonyms
- Troglodytes obsoleta (Say, 1822); Troglodytes latifasciatus (Deppe, 1830)

= Rock wren =

Species of songbird

The rock wren (Salpinctes obsoletus) is a small songbird of the wren family native to the rocky areas of western North America. There are 8 subspecies of the rock wren, one of which is extinct. They are similar in size to other wrens, with a grey-brown coat, a brown rump, and a speckled white throat.

They are visually similar to the canyon wren, which they share a habitat with. They are noted for their variable song and song pattern, used for territory defense, as well as their habit of building "pavements" with flat rocks around their nest to help nestlings stay dry. Rock wrens are serially monogamous, forming pairs for nesting season. Nestbuilding usually begins in March, usually in crevices, and the first brood are laid late April to June, with a possible second brood later in June.

They are largely terrestrial foragers, rarely flying. Their diet consists of insects, mostly weevils, during the spring and summer, shifting to grain during autumn and winter. Though they are a least-concern species, their population size has declined by 13% from 2010 to 2020.

== Taxonomy ==
The rock wren was first described by Thomas Say, published in Edwin James' book Account of an Expedition from Pittsburgh to the Rocky Mountains, as Troglodytes obsoleta. The work was available in 1822, even though the date printed on the title page is 1823; 1822 thus counts as the date of description of the species. It was later moved to its own monotypic genus, Salpinctes, by Jean Cabanis in 1847, because of its straighter tail. Salpinctes formerly included the canyon wren (synonym Thryothorus mexicanus), but it was later removed.

The genus name, Salpinctes, comes from the Greek word for 'trumpeter'. Its specific epithet, obsoletus, is Latin for 'worn out'. There are 8 subspecies, split into 2 groups (obsoletus and guttatus).

=== Northern group (obsoletus) ===
- S. o. obsoletus (Say, 1822)—Nominate subspecies.
- S. o. guadeloupensis (Ridgway, 1876)—Darker than other island populations, with a longer, heavier bill and shorter wing and tail. Juveniles have barred, dusky backs. Its name, guadeloupensis, comes from its habitat, Guadalupe Island, off western Baja California.
- S. o. tenuirostris (van Rossem, 1943)—Similar to nominate, but with thinner and longer bill. Found on San Benito Island. Its name comes from the Latin words tenuis and rostrum, meaning 'slender' and 'beak', respectively.
- S. o. exsul (Ridgway, 1903)—Extinct from the eruption of Volcán Bárcena. Formerly found on San Benedicto Island. Said to have been generally darker than nominate, along with more yellowish-brown stripes on outer tail feathers. Its name comes from the Latin word exsul, meaning 'exile'.
- S. o. neglectus (Nelson, 1897)—Similar to nominate, but with barred flanks, darker, and more spots on the breast. Noted to be variable in appearance. Found in the highlands of southern Mexico. Name comes from Latin neglectus, meaning 'overlooked'.

=== Southern group (guttatus) ===
- S. o. guttatus (Salvin and Godman, 1891)—Flanks are spotted, instead of barred like fasciatus. Found in the highlands of El Salvador. Name comes from Latin guttatus, meaning 'spotted'.
- S. o. fasciatus (Salvin and Godman, 1891)—Flanks are barred, instead of spotted like guttatus. Found in the highlands of Nicaragua. Name comes from Latin fasciatus, meaning 'banded'.
- S. o. costaricensis (van Rossem, 1941)—Generally paler compared to fasciatus, as well as having a longer, larger bill. Found in the highlands of northwestern Costa Rica. The name comes from the name for Costa Rica.

== Description ==
The rock wren is between 12.5–15 cm (4.9–5.9 in) in length and has a wingspan of 22–24 cm (8.7–9.4 in). It has a bill length of 18.7 mm (0.74 in) in males and 17.8 mm (0.70 in) in females. Its wing length is 70.3 mm (2.77 in) in males, and slightly less at 67.8 mm (2.67 in) in females; similarly, its tail length is 51.9 mm (2.04 in) and 47.8 mm (1.88 in) in males and females, respectively. However, males weigh 15.7 g (0.55 oz), slightly less than females, who weigh 17.2 g (0.61 oz).

Rock wrens have grey-brown upperparts with small black and white spots and pale grey underparts with a light brown rump. Additional features include a light grey line extending through the eye, a long and sharp bill, a speckled light gray throat, a long barred tail, zebra-striped undertail coverts, and dark legs. The juvenile plumage is similar to that of an adult, except for a slightly more vibrant buff, similar to a washed-out cinnamon color, fluffier body feathers, and the absence of a dark streak and spots on the underparts.

Though they are very distinct in their habitat, it is possible to confuse them with the canyon wren, which have superficially similar coloring; however, the canyon wren has solid white throats and generally brighter, less muddled colors.

== Distribution and habitat ==
Rock wrens are permanent residents in the south of their range, including California; western Washington; northern Nevada, Arizona, and New Mexico; southern Guatemala and Nicaragua; northwestern Costa Rica and Panama; and inland Mexico, including Baja California. They are also residents of Guadalupe Island and San Benito Island. They are occasional vagrants in the eastern United States. During the breeding season, their range extends to the southern interior of British Columbia, as well as Wyoming, Montana, Idaho, and Utah. They are commonly found in rocky open habitats, such as exposed rock, canyons, cliffs; however, rock is not a firm requirement, as they can also be found in large eroded sandbanks. Rock wrens are rare in urban areas, instead preferring rocky areas with at least some steep features, enough shrubbery to forage in, and ample crevices for nesting. The rock wren is very tolerant of altitudes, breeding from 60 m (200 ft) to 3,600 m (11,800 ft) above sea level; however, they are most common below 2,000 m (6,600 ft).

== Behavior ==
Rock wrens are serially monogamous. During nesting season, males are territorial, guarding their area of around 1.8 hectares (4.4 acres) in size with songs, calls, and threat displays, such as bobbing. Males have been observed courting by bringing food to females.

=== Breeding ===
Nest-building begins in March, and the first brood occurs late April to June, and a second brood can occur from mid-June to early August, with up to 3 broods per year. Rock wrens nest on stone surfaces in crevices, cavities, or other similar sheltered areas. They lay 5–6 eggs per clutch, with incubation being around 14–16 days. Incubation is handled by the female alone; however, males will occasionally bring food.

Eggs are ovate, usually 18.6 mm × 14.8 mm (0.73 in × 0.58 in) in size and around 2.27 g (0.080 oz) in mass. One egg is laid per day.

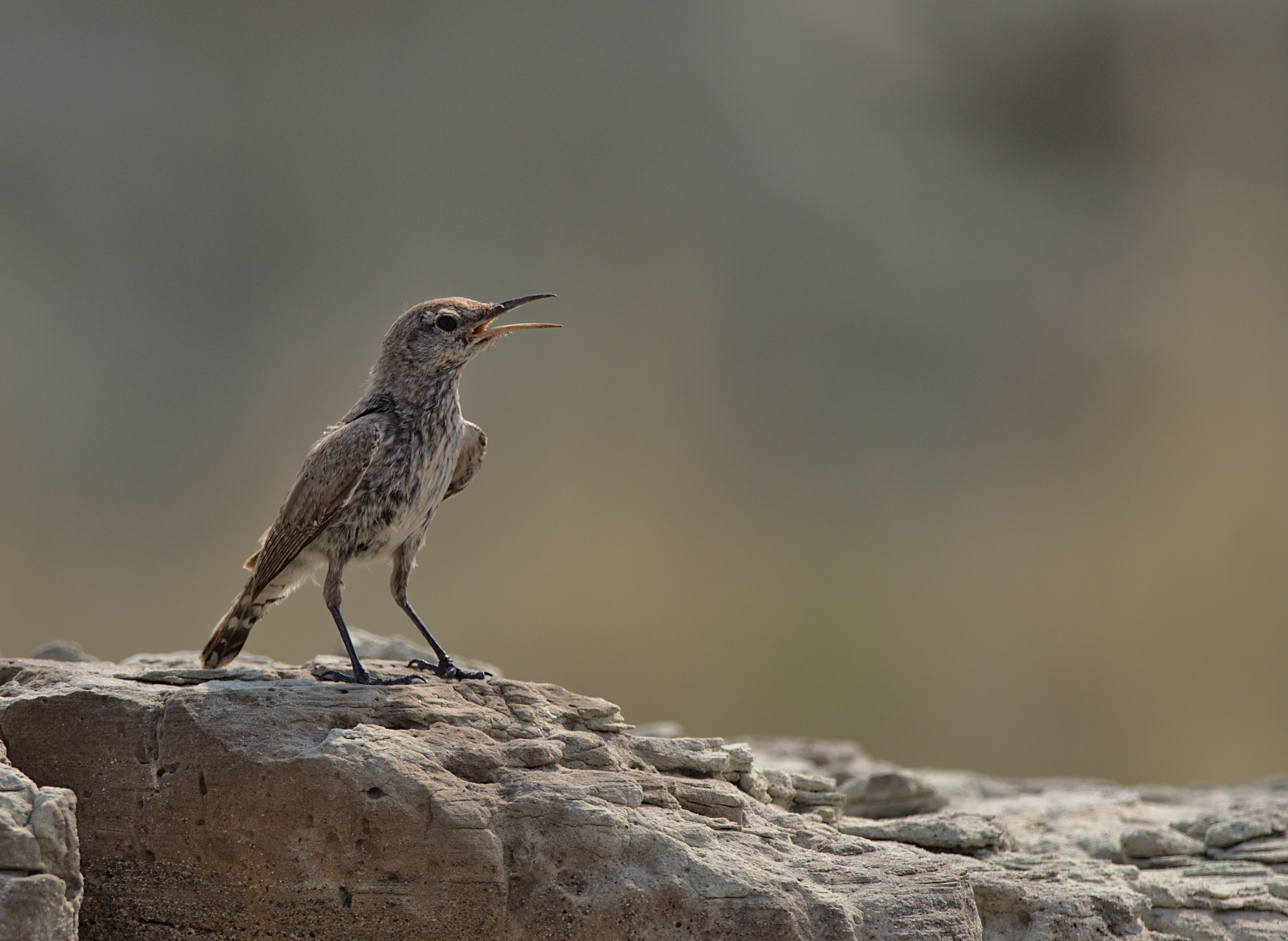
A fledgling rock wren

The outsides of the nests are roughly 8.9 cm (3.5 in) in diameter and 3.4 cm (1.3 in) in depth, with the inside 6.7 cm (2.6 in) and 2.9 cm (1.1 in) in diameter and depth, respectively. Nests are usually built in cavities with openings around 2 times the bird's height, or 10.2 cm (4.0 in). They are built on top of a stone foundation, and consist of stones, plant material, trash, and other debris. Nests often include a "pavement" made with stones leading up to the nest to keep the nest and nestlings dry, helping them maintain their body temperature. Pavements consist of flat stones, on average 3.1 g (0.11 oz) in weight, 27 by 18 mm (1.06 by 0.71 in) in width and length, and 5 mm (0.20 in) thick. These stones weigh on average 20% of the bird's body mass, with an average of 230 stones per nest; the amount of stones vary with the size of the nest cavity, with larger cavities having more stones.

Nestlings leave the nest around 14–16 days old, moving to a different rock within 75 m (246 ft) from the nest, continuing to receive care from parents for about 1 week, and remained on the parent's territory for 4 more weeks. Nestlings molted at 28–35 days, however, they still possessed gape flanges.

=== Feeding ===
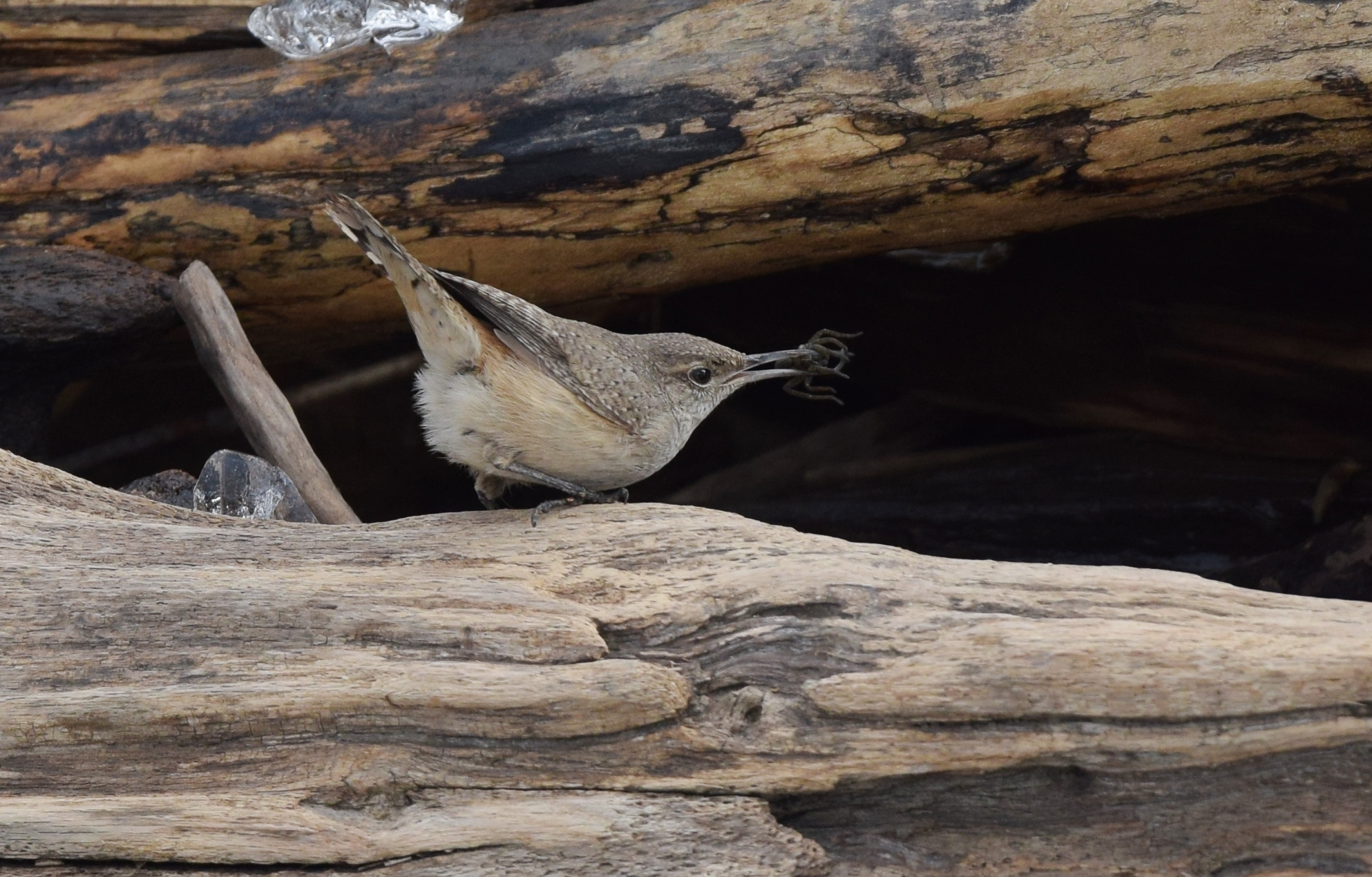
A rock wren with a spider in its beak

Rock wrens are largely terrestrial, only flying for short durations, and instead using a very rapid gait to move around. They eat insects, such as leafhoppers, ants, and weevils; occasionally, other arthropods like spiders; and, rarely, seeds. Rock wrens mainly forage during the day on open ground, rummaging the surface of rocks and soil and probing crevices.

Nestlings were observed being fed grasshoppers, along with other insects; however, large portions of the prey could not be identified due to their small size.

=== Vocalizations ===
Female rock wrens do not sing; however, males have large repertoires of 69–119 syllables, each song a 1–2.5 second trill of repeated syllables, with 3–5 seconds between songs. Rock wrens have five call types: a two-part tic-ear/spit-tee sometimes used to warn of intruders; a rough trill, sometimes following a spit, used as an alarm; an agitated chatter; and an aggressive k'chee used during confrontations.

Rock wrens sing with a distinctive pattern intermediate between "eventual variety" (repeating one syllable before switching) and "immediate variety" (never repeating). A male typically sings each syllable three to four times within a burst of 10–15 syllables, rarely repeating the same syllable consecutively. Song is primarily used for territorial defense, with males having greater repertoire size and pitch variety being more effective at deterring rivals.

== Conservation ==
The rock wren is a least-concern species on the IUCN Red List, with an estimated population of 3.4 million in the United States and Canada, with the global population being around 4.1 million. However, the population is slowly declining, with a 13% decrease in population from 2010 to 2020. The cause of this is unknown. Little is known about the causes of mortality or lifespan in adults, but nests are subject to predation. Observed nest predators included the striped racer snake, the desert woodrat, and the white-tailed antelope squirrel, as well as bullsnakes and prairie rattlesnakes. Brown-headed cowbirds are brood parasites of this species.

== See also ==
- Volcán Bárcena, the volcano that caused the San Benedicto rock wren (a subspecies of Salpinctes) to go extinct in 1952
