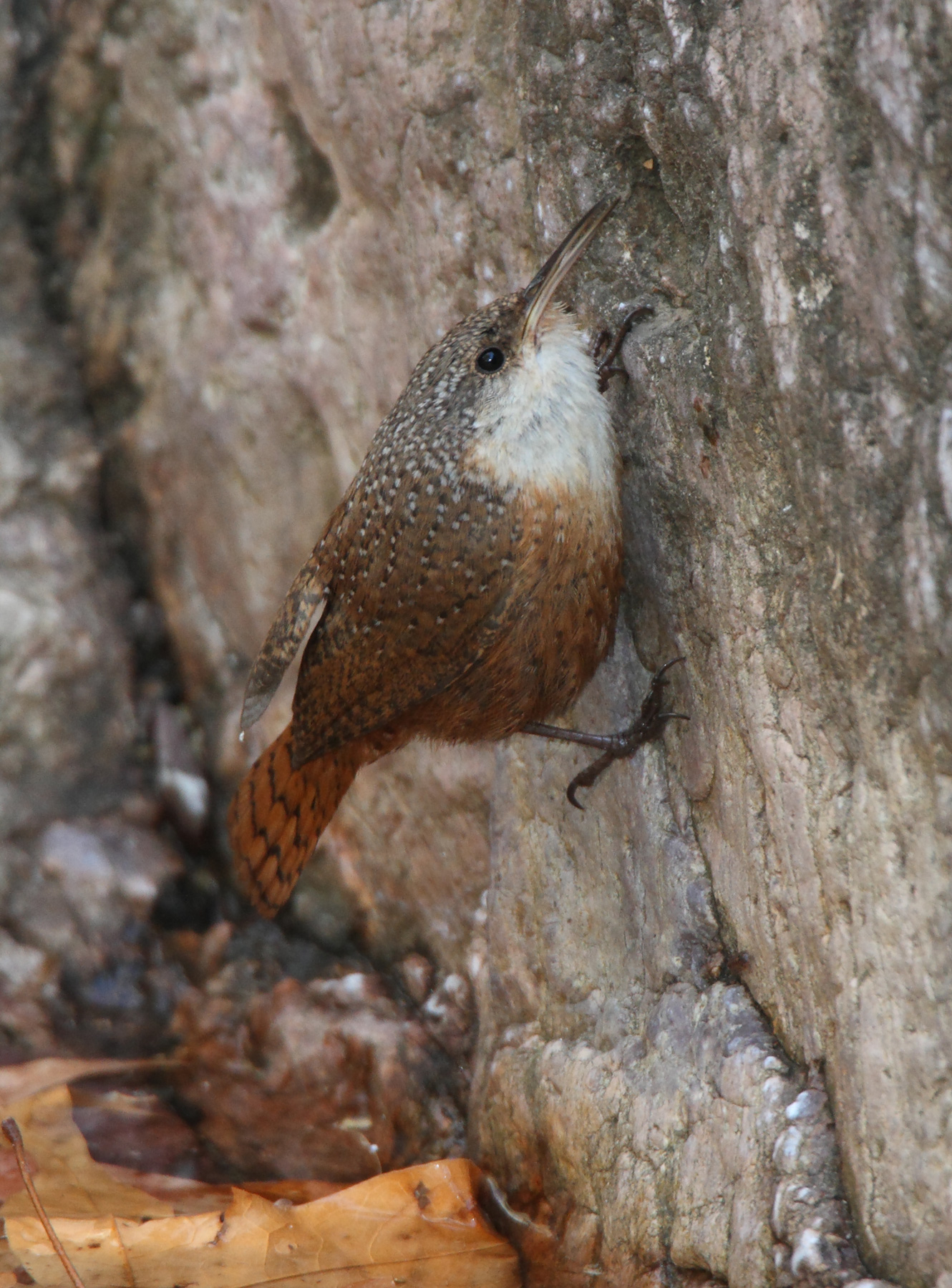
- in Madera Canyon, Arizona

Conservation status
- Least Concern (IUCN 3.1)

Scientific classification
- Kingdom: Animalia
- Phylum: Chordata
- Class: Aves
- Order: Passeriformes
- Family: Troglodytidae
- Genus: Catherpes; Baird, 1858
- Species: C. mexicanus

Binomial name
- Catherpes mexicanus (Swainson, 1829)

= Canyon wren =

Species of bird

The canyon wren (Catherpes mexicanus) is a small North American songbird of the wren family Troglodytidae. A non-migratory species, these birds are found throughout western North America in dry, rocky environments such as cliffs, outcrops, and canyons. It is a small bird that is hard to see on its rocky habitat, and is often located by its loud distinctive song. It is currently in a monotypic taxon and is the only species in the genus Catherpes.

== Taxonomy ==
The canyon wren's genus name, Catherpes, derives from the Greek word "kathero", meaning to creep down: a reference to its tendency to cling to vertical walls. Its species name, mexicanus, refers to the country of Mexico, where it is widely found.

The taxonomy of the species has been altered and debated for many years. Originally in the genus Thryothorus, it was moved into the genus Salpinctes along with the rock wren (Salpinctes obsoletus), where some researchers still place it. As of 2025, the species is in the only species in the genus Catherpes.

Latest scientific consensus acknowledges 8 valid subspecies of Catherpes mexicanus:

- C. mexicanus cantator
- C. mexicanus conspersus
- C. mexicanus croizati
- C. mexicanus griseus
- C. mexicanus meliphonus
- C. mexicanus mexicanus
- C. mexicanus pallidior
- C. mexicanus punctulatus

== Description ==
The canyon wren measures 14–15 cm (5.5–5.9 in) with a long thin beak and square-tipped tail. Its speckled, chestnut coloration shades to gray at the head with a contrasting white throat patch. Its coloration and small size allow it to camouflage seamlessly with its rocky environment.

The canyon wren's loud, distinctive call consists of a series of cascading notes. It sings most frequently in spring, however mated pairs may sing at any time. When defending its territory, the song is harsher and has a lower frequency,

== Distribution ==
Though canyon wrens do not migrate, individuals may make short seasonal movements. Their typical range extends from southern British Columbia (in the Okanagan Valley) throughout much of the western United States and Mexico. Disjunct populations occur in the Black Hills of southwest South Dakota, northeast Wyoming and southeast Montana.

== Habitat ==
Much like the rock wren, the canyon wren prefers steep, rocky environments, particularly in arid landscapes, though they can also be found foraging near rivers. Canyon wrens live year-round in large, widely spaced territories where they forage, breed, and nest.

In Colorado, canyon wrens frequently associate with cliff swallows, whose nests provide opportunities for foraging and are sometimes adopted by canyon wrens as nesting sites.

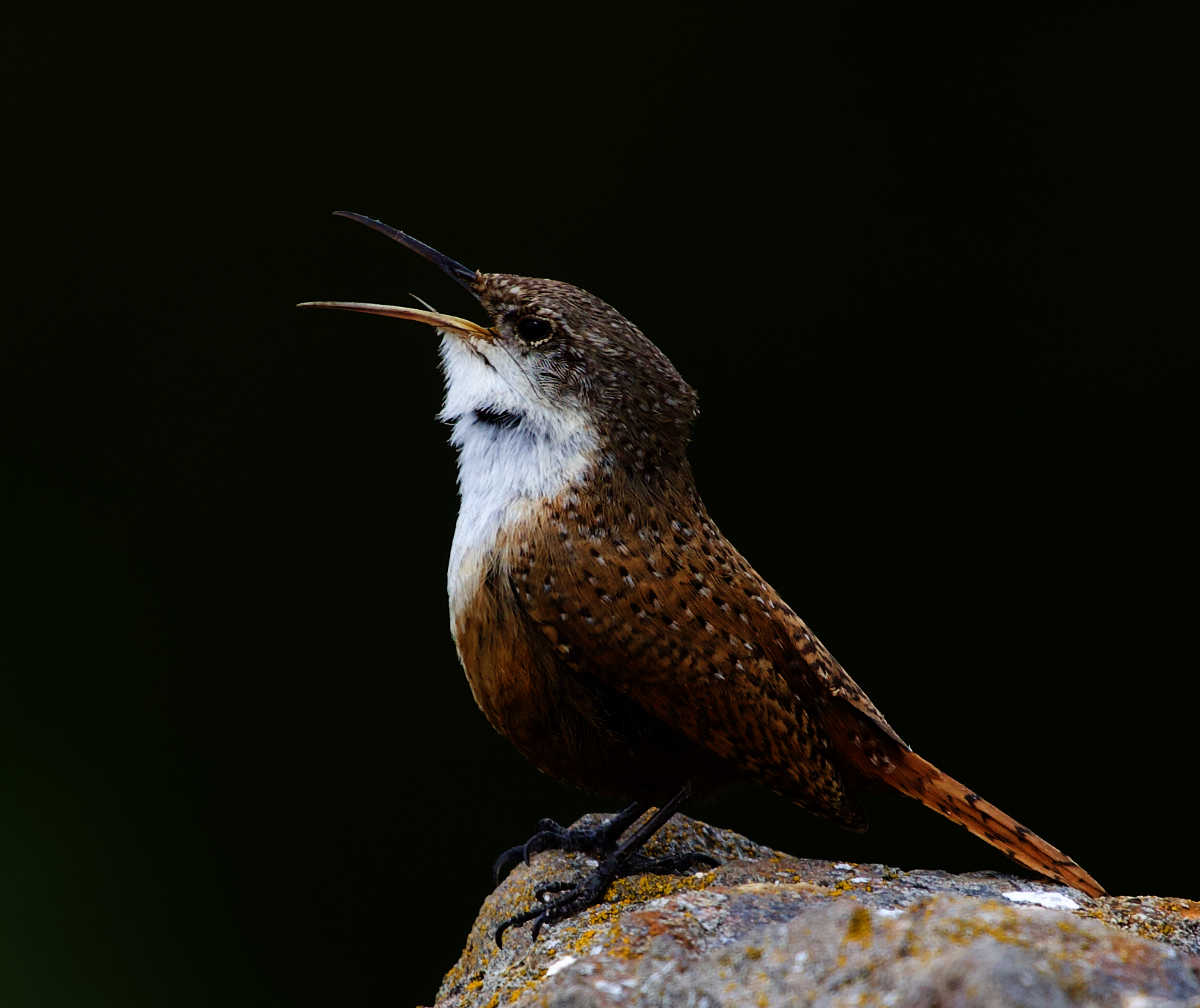
Canyon wren singing

== Diet ==
The canyon wren uses its long, slender beaks to probe crevices in the rock for small insects and spiders, and will sometimes steal prey found in spiderwebs or wasp nests. Though it mainly forages along rock surfaces, it will occasionally hunt in bushes, on the ground, or even take insects in flight.

== Breeding ==
The canyon wren chooses sheltered nesting sites, typically in rocky crevices. More rarely their nests can be found in hollow stumps and manmade structures, or even in living trees. Both sexes of canyon wren contribute to building the nest, starting with a foundation of course material such as twigs, grass, and bark, upon which they form a smaller cup-like structure composed of softer material, including fur, spiderwebs, feathers, and plant down. Canyon wrens sometimes reuse nests from previous years.

Together, the pair will lay 4-6 small white eggs 1-2 times per year.

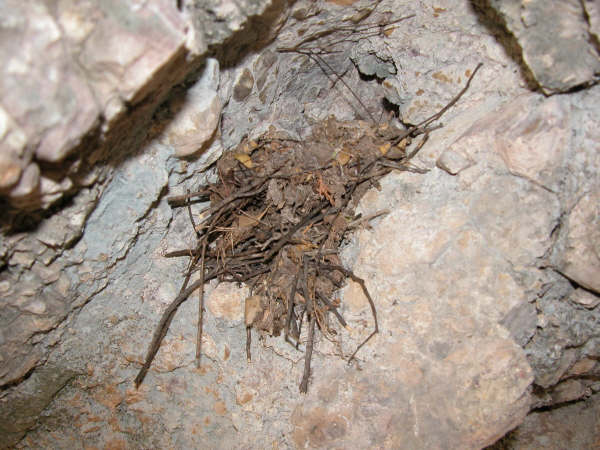
Canyon wren nest from Texas

== Cited texts ==
- Howell, Steve N. G.; Webb, Sophie (1995). A Guide to the Birds of Mexico and Northern Central America. Oxford University Press. ISBN 0-19-854012-4.
- "Catherpes mexicanus". Integrated Taxonomic Information System.
- Jones, Stephanie L.; Dieni, J. S.; Araya, A. C. (2002). "Reproductive biology of Canyon Wrens in the Front Range of Colorado". Wilson Bulletin. 114 (4): 446–449. doi:10.1676/0043-5643(2002)114[0446:RBOCWI]2.0.CO;2. JSTOR 4164488. S2CID 85965537.
- Brewer, D. (2001). Wrens, dippers, and thrashers. New Haven, Connecticut: Yale University Press. ISBN 978-0-300-09059-8.
