= Arrow Canyon Range =

Mountain range in Nevada, United States

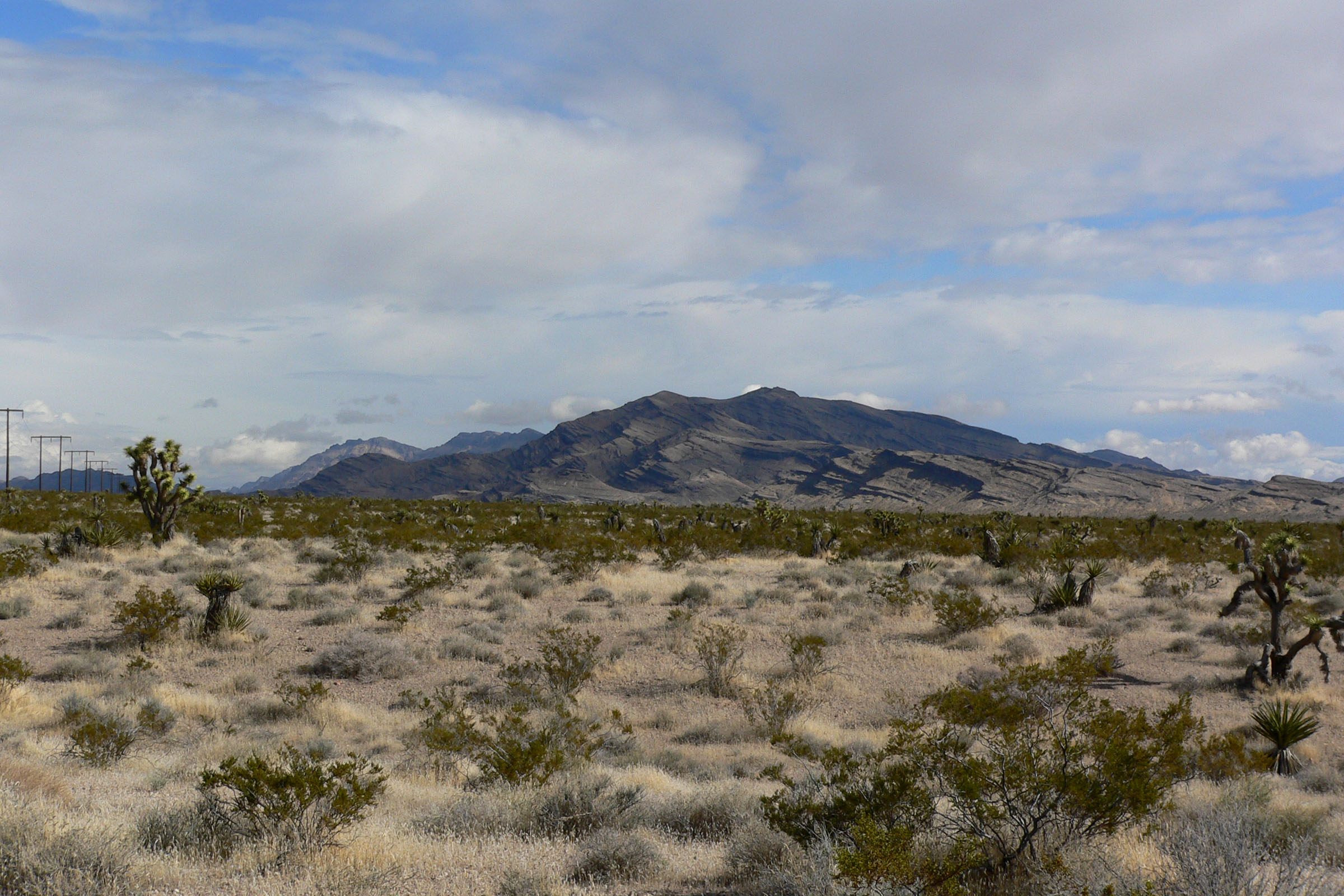
- Seen from the south (with Creosote bushes and some Joshua Trees)

Highest point
- Elevation: 1,219 m (3,999 ft)

Geography
- Location within Nevada
- Country: United States
- State: Nevada
- District: Clark County
- Range coordinates: 36°40′24.888″N 114°51′46.003″W
- Topo map: USGS Arrow Canyon

The Arrow Canyon Range is a small, narrow Basin and Range faulted mountain range that runs south to north in Clark County, Nevada, United States. Its length is approximately 25 miles at a latitude 36˚35' - 36˚47', and its width is roughly 7 miles at a longitude of 114˚54' - 114˚47'. The base elevation is 3,000 ft, and it rises to 4,953 ft at its peak. It runs parallel to U.S. Route 93, where the western front is easily viewed along the entire length, only about 3.5 mi distant. Like many mountain ranges in southern Nevada, it has the distinctive bare gray limestone formations common in the region. The dark band towards the upper third is tilted and broken, showing the intense geologic activity from the past.
