= Mormon Well Spring =

Coordinates: 36°38′39″N 115°05′47″W

- U.S. National Register of Historic Places
- Location: N of Las Vegas on Mormon Spring
- Nearest city: Las Vegas, Nevada
- NRHP reference No.: 74001143
- Added to NRHP: December 24, 1974

Mormon Well Spring is an area located in the United States' Desert National Wildlife Range that was used from around 1900–1924 for ranching. It is listed on the United States National Register of Historic Places. Nearby is Corn Creek Campsite, another listed historic place.

Currently the spring is used to provide water for animals using structures provided by the Bureau of Land Management (BLM).

== History ==
Long prior to its ranching use, the site has indications of Native American use, by such as the Southern Paiute people, from 1000 AD to 1900 AD.

The site was listed on the National Register of Historic Places on December 24, 1974.
