= Desert National Wildlife Refuge =

Large protected area in Nevada, United States

- IUCN category IV (habitat/species management area)
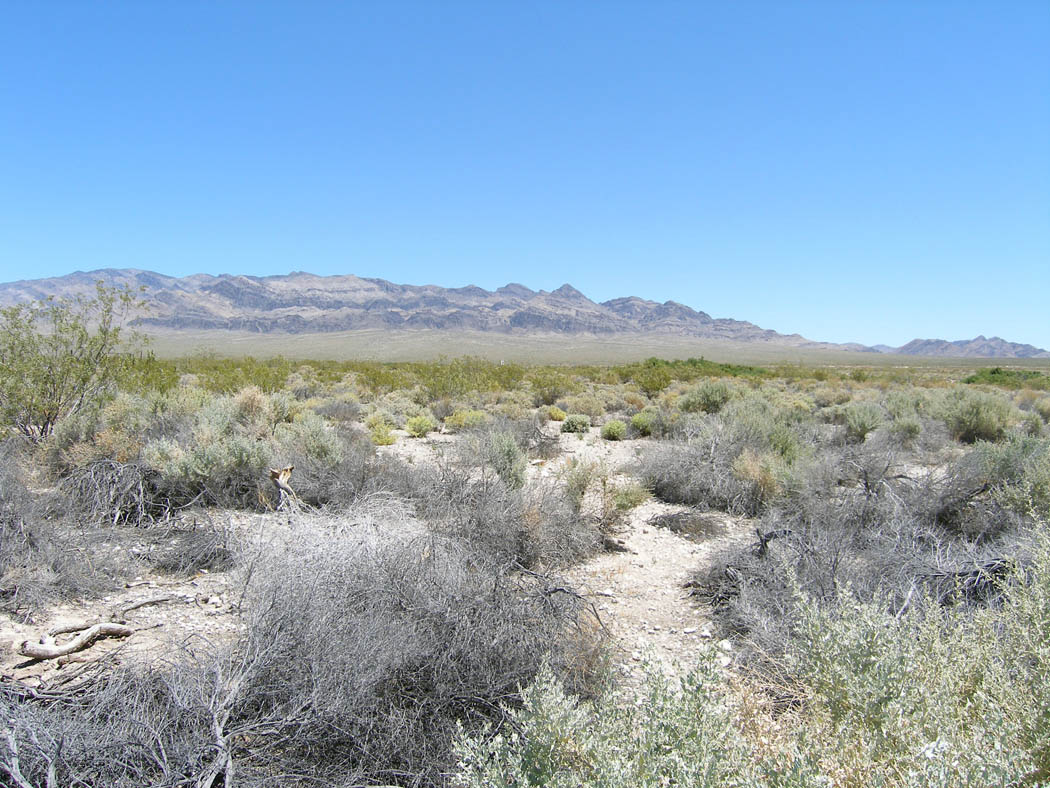
- Desert environment in the Desert National Wildlife Refuge

- Location within the United States
- Location: Clark County, Lincoln County, Nevada, United States
- Nearest city: Las Vegas, Nevada
- Coordinates: 36°46′N 115°26′W
- Area: 1,615,000 acres (6,540 km^{2})
- Established: 1936
- Governing body: U.S. Fish and Wildlife Service
- Website: Desert National Wildlife Refuge

The Desert National Wildlife Refuge is a protected wildlife refuge, administered by the U.S. Fish and Wildlife Service, located north of Las Vegas, Nevada, in northwestern Clark and southwestern Lincoln counties, with much of its land area lying within the southeastern section of the Nevada Test and Training Range. The Desert NWR, created on May 20, 1936, is the largest wildlife refuge in the lower 48 states of the United States, encompassing 1.615 million acres (6,540 km^{2}) of the Mojave Desert in the southern part of Nevada. The refuge was originally established at 2.25 million acres. In 1940 840,000 acres were transferred to the Department of Defense.

This Range is part of the larger Desert National Wildlife Refuge Complex, which includes the Ash Meadows National Wildlife Refuge, the Moapa Valley National Wildlife Refuge, and the Pahranagat National Wildlife Refuge. All of these refuges are managed from a central office, have similar ecology, and similar management needs. Fish and Wildlife Service staff are shared between all of these refuges.

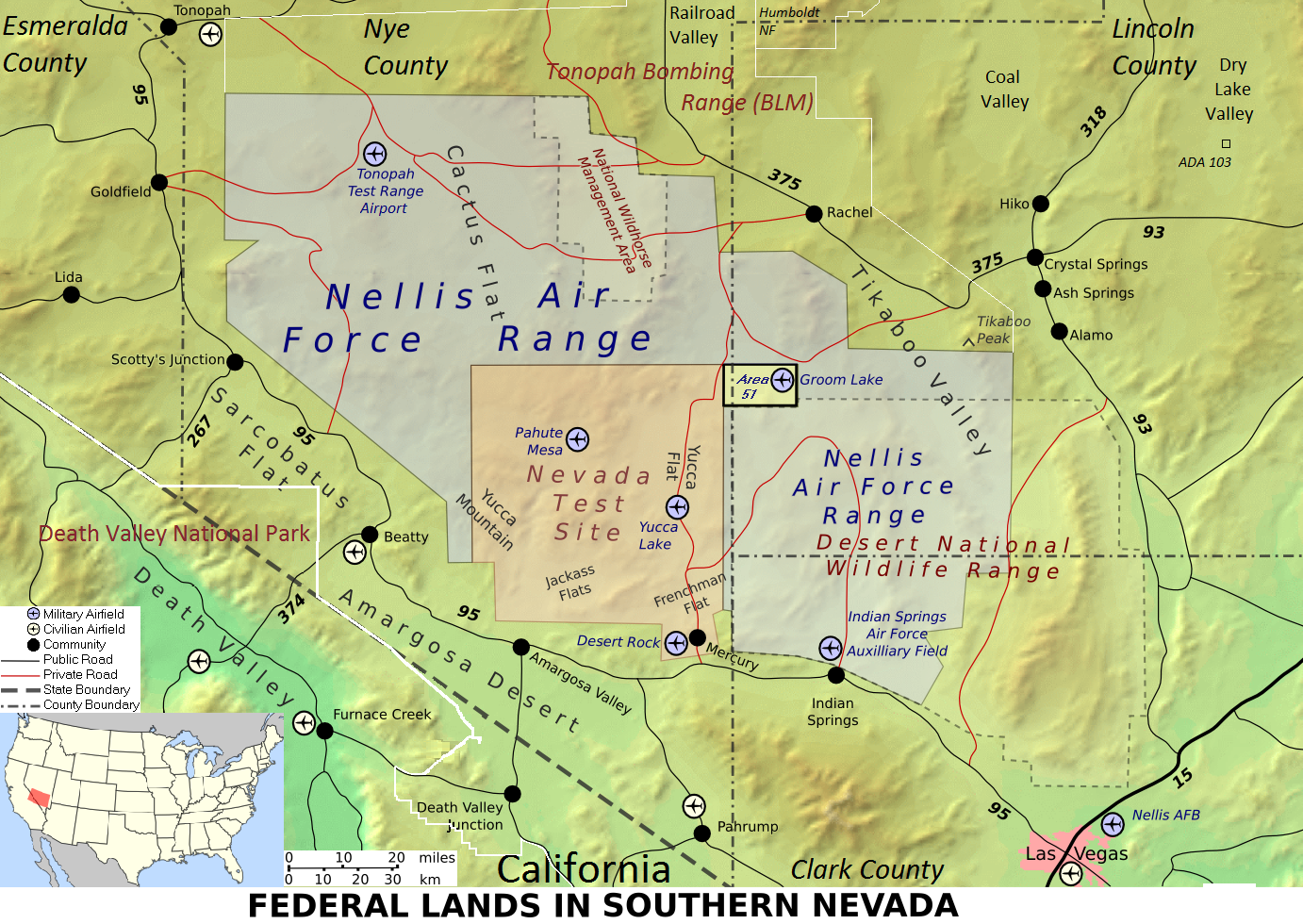
Map showing the Desert National Wildlife Reserve and other federal properties in southern Nevada

== Description ==
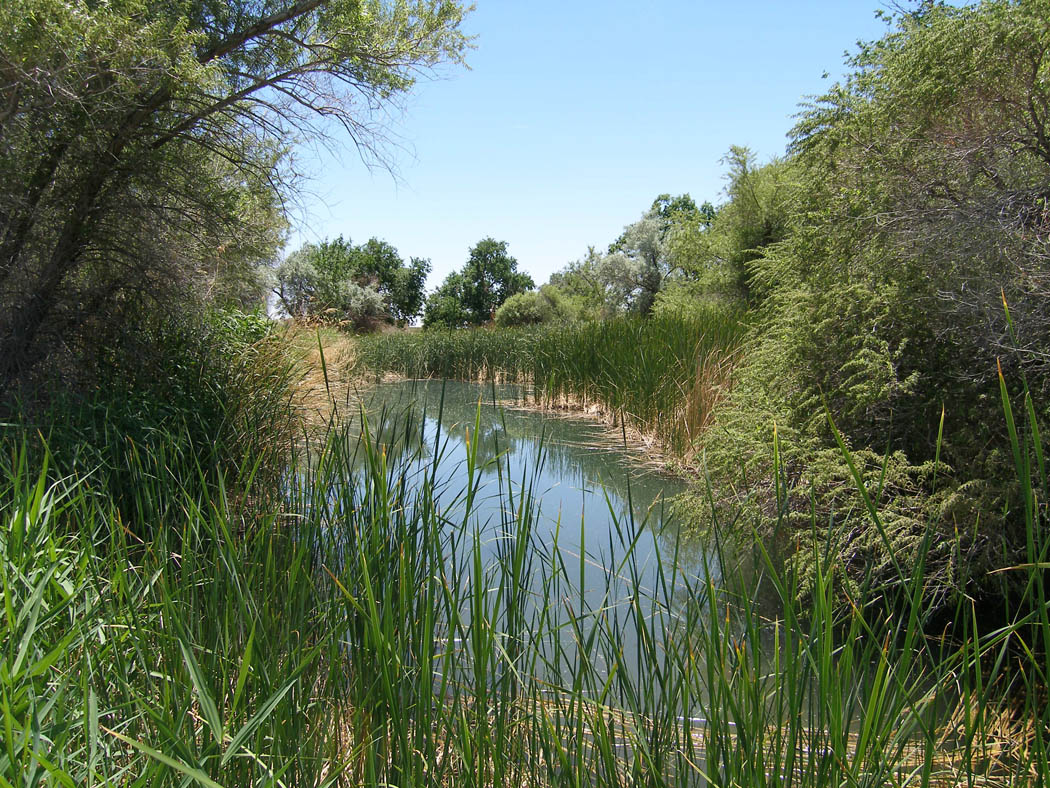
Corn Creek Springs at Desert National Wildlife Refuge

Range/Refuge staff work out of the Corn Creek Field Station, which includes a visitor center, which is located 23 miles (37 km) north of Las Vegas, Nevada. The Range can be accessed from U.S. Route 95 via Corn Creek Road.

The Desert NWR contains six major mountain ranges, including the Sheep Range, with heights up to 10,000 feet (3,000 m) and valleys around 2,500 feet (760 m). Annual rainfall in the range varies from less than four inches (100 mm) in the valleys to over fifteen inches (380 mm) on the mountain peaks.

Perpetuating the desert bighorn sheep and its habitat is the most important objective of the range. The Range actively improves bighorn habitats by developing new water sources and maintaining and improving existing ones. Numerous other wildlife species share the range with bighorns.

In addition to wildlife the Range also boasts an abundance of plant communities. Plant communities and wildlife found on the Range vary with altitude and climate. Most of these plant species can be seen while driving the Mormon Well Road (which can be accessed from the Corn Creek Field Station). The desert shrub community, composed of creosote bush and white bursage are the dominant shrubs in the hottest, lowest elevations of Desert National Wildlife Range. Above the valley floor, Mojave yucca and cactus become abundant. At the upper edge of the desert shrub communities, between approximately 4,200 to 6,000 feet (1,300 to 1,800 m), black-brush and Joshua tree are dominant. Above 6,000 feet (1,800 m) desert woodlands, composed of single-leaf pinyon, Utah juniper, and big sagebrush begin. The coniferous forest communities begin around 7,000 feet (2,100 m). From 7,000 to 9,000 feet (2,100 to 2,700 m) Ponderosa pine and white fir are the dominant trees. Near 10,000 feet (3,000 m) where the growing seasons are the shortest, the only trees surviving are bristlecone pines.

Numerous recreational opportunities are available on the Range. Camping, hiking, backpacking, and horseback riding are all popular activities enjoyed by refuge visitors. Limited hunting for bighorn sheep is permitted.

== Climate ==
Climate data for Desert National Wildlife Refuge, Nevada, 1991–2020 normals, extremes 1940–present
Month	Jan	Feb	Mar	Apr	May	Jun	Jul	Aug	Sep	Oct	Nov	Dec	Year
Record high °F (°C)	83 (28)	87 (31)	96 (36)	98 (37)	108 (42)	113 (45)	117 (47)	114 (46)	109 (43)	100 (38)	94 (34)	81 (27)	117 (47)
Mean maximum °F (°C)	68.9 (20.5)	72.2 (22.3)	81.7 (27.6)	90.9 (32.7)	99.0 (37.2)	107.0 (41.7)	110.8 (43.8)	108.2 (42.3)	102.4 (39.1)	92.9 (33.8)	79.9 (26.6)	68.1 (20.1)	111.4 (44.1)
Mean daily maximum °F (°C)	56.8 (13.8)	60.5 (15.8)	68.0 (20.0)	75.5 (24.2)	85.3 (29.6)	96.1 (35.6)	101.2 (38.4)	99.5 (37.5)	92.0 (33.3)	79.0 (26.1)	65.5 (18.6)	55.6 (13.1)	77.9 (25.5)
Daily mean °F (°C)	43.8 (6.6)	47.0 (8.3)	53.6 (12.0)	60.0 (15.6)	69.1 (20.6)	78.5 (25.8)	84.4 (29.1)	82.8 (28.2)	75.0 (23.9)	62.6 (17.0)	50.8 (10.4)	42.8 (6.0)	62.5 (16.9)
Mean daily minimum °F (°C)	30.8 (−0.7)	33.6 (0.9)	39.1 (3.9)	44.6 (7.0)	52.9 (11.6)	60.9 (16.1)	67.6 (19.8)	66.0 (18.9)	58.1 (14.5)	46.2 (7.9)	36.0 (2.2)	30.0 (−1.1)	47.2 (8.4)
Mean minimum °F (°C)	20.9 (−6.2)	24.0 (−4.4)	29.3 (−1.5)	34.8 (1.6)	42.3 (5.7)	50.7 (10.4)	58.5 (14.7)	57.2 (14.0)	48.1 (8.9)	35.8 (2.1)	25.4 (−3.7)	20.5 (−6.4)	18.0 (−7.8)
Record low °F (°C)	0 (−18)	10 (−12)	17 (−8)	23 (−5)	30 (−1)	36 (2)	43 (6)	43 (6)	38 (3)	19 (−7)	16 (−9)	3 (−16)	0 (−18)
Average precipitation inches (mm)	0.58 (15)	0.80 (20)	0.62 (16)	0.25 (6.4)	0.17 (4.3)	0.08 (2.0)	0.46 (12)	0.28 (7.1)	0.26 (6.6)	0.40 (10)	0.27 (6.9)	0.44 (11)	4.61 (117)
Average snowfall inches (cm)	trace	0.1 (0.25)	0.0 (0.0)	0.0 (0.0)	0.0 (0.0)	0.0 (0.0)	0.0 (0.0)	0.0 (0.0)	0.0 (0.0)	0.0 (0.0)	0.0 (0.0)	0.2 (0.51)	0.3 (0.76)
Average precipitation days (≥ 0.01 in)	3.0	3.7	2.7	1.8	1.2	0.5	2.6	2.0	1.3	1.7	1.4	2.4	24.3
Average snowy days (≥ 0.1 in)	0.1	0.1	0.0	0.0	0.0	0.0	0.0	0.0	0.0	0.0	0.0	0.1	0.3
Source: NOAA

== See also ==
- Mormon Well Spring
