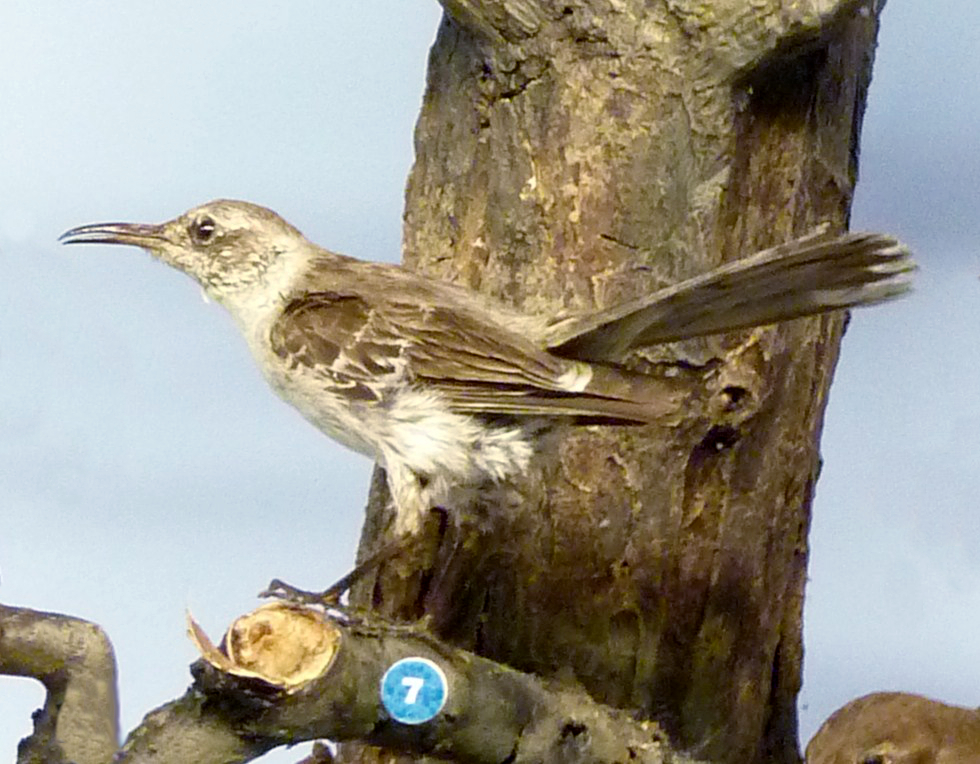

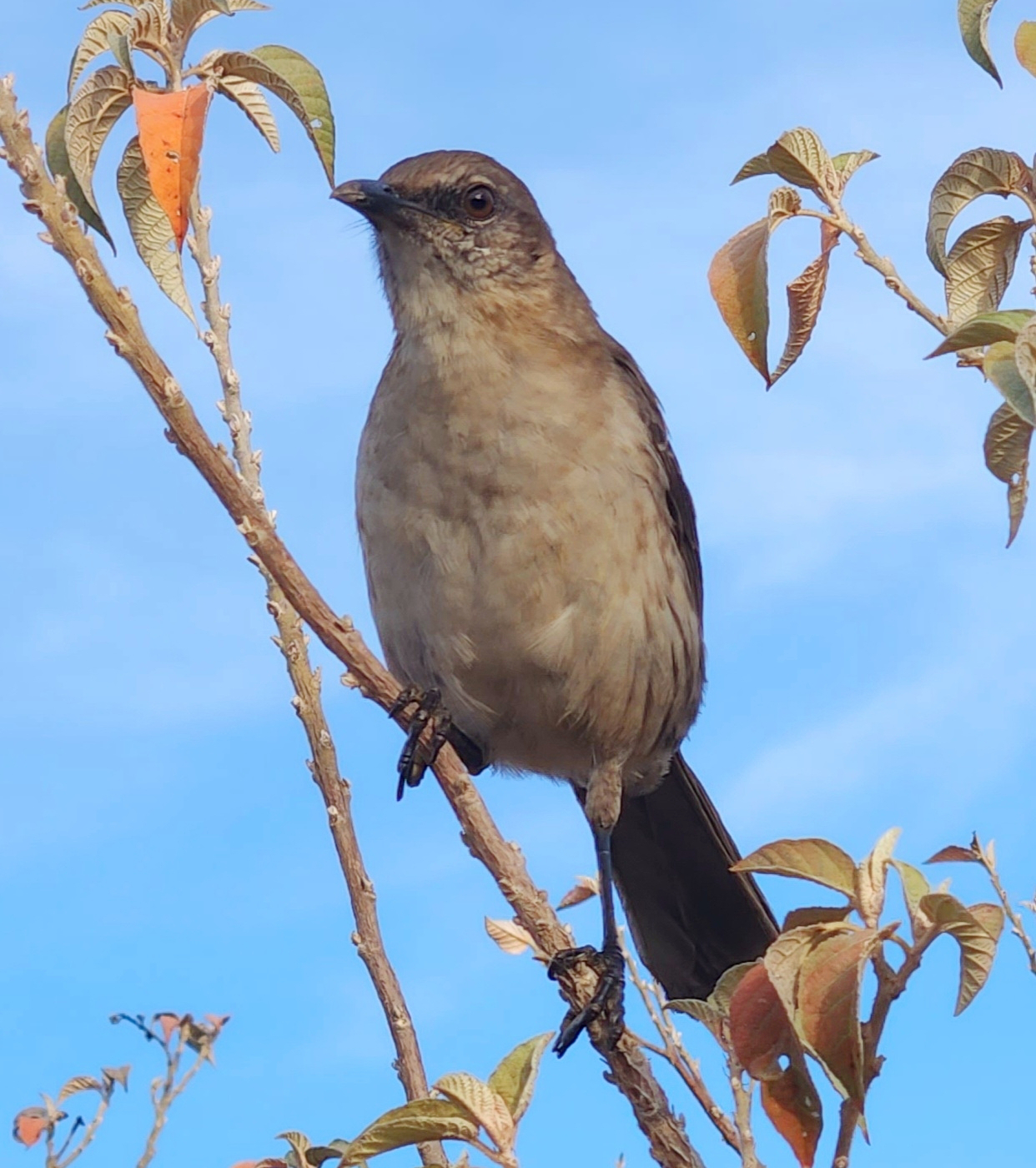

Conservation status
- Critically Endangered (IUCN 3.1)

Scientific classification
- Kingdom: Animalia
- Phylum: Chordata
- Class: Aves
- Order: Passeriformes
- Family: Mimidae
- Genus: Mimus
- Species: M. graysoni

Binomial name
- Mimus graysoni (Lawrence, 1871)

Synonyms
- Mimodes graysoni Ridgway, 1882

= Socorro mockingbird =

Species of bird

The Socorro mockingbird (Mimus graysoni) is an endangered mockingbird endemic to Socorro Island in Mexico's Revillagigedo Islands. The specific epithet commemorates the American ornithologist Andrew Jackson Grayson.

Mimus graysoni shows its close relationship to the northern and tropical mockingbirds rather subtly. It is a much stouter bird, resembling some thrashers in habitus. It also has a distinct juvenile plumage, more rufous above and has a heavy pattern, especially below. This uncannily resembles, e.g., the gray thrasher (Toxostoma cinereum) from Baja California, but is apparently a case of convergent evolution.

== Systematics and taxonomy ==
This is a rather distinct Mimus mockingbird and was for some time placed into a distinct genus, Mimodes. This was revealed to be incorrect based on analysis of mtDNA NADH dehydrogenase subunit 2 sequences.

Rather, the present species is closely related to the northern and tropical mockingbirds. Its distinctiveness is the result of the strong selective pressure on its island home, which enforced the evolution of conspicuous adaptational autapomorphies. The juvenile plumage might also have been the result of genetic drift enforced maybe by resource partitioning in this aggressive bird. The standard model of molecular clocks cannot be applied for mimids as their rates of mutation seem to vary much over time. While it is the most phenotypically distinctive bird on Socorro, it also has the strongest ecological change from its ancestors; therefore its distinctiveness is not informative except supporting the theory that it is one of the older Socorro endemics.

Thus, and because the adaptation to the peculiar conditions on Socorro may even have accelerated not only morphological but also molecular evolution – see also founder effect — it cannot be said with any certainty whether or not among Mimus, the Socorro species is a quite recent island offshoot of either of the mainland species. In any case, the three taxa are very close relatives.

== Ecology and status ==
The Socorro mockingbird today lives mainly in unmodified low forest above 600 m (2000 ft), where it prefers groves of Oreopanax xalapensis and the endemic Guettarda insularis, with an understorey dominated by Triumfetta socorrensis and the endemic Eupatorium pacificum. As late as March 1953 it was still "common" at lower elevations, foraging in arid open shrublands of Croton masonii and prickly pear. (Note: Probably Engelmann's Prickly Pear (Opuntia engelmannii): Brattstrom & Howell (1956)) In November of the same year, the birds had retired to the more humid forest in the uplands and were busy singing and defending territories. Today, they mainly remain in Ficus cotinifolia stands when visiting the lower elevations. The breeding season is extended, with nests in attendance between November and July, with the peak laying occurring in March and April. Three eggs are laid, which take no more 15 days to hatch.

The birds are generally reluctant to fly and as late as the mid-20th century were still fatally unwary; if pressed they will rather hop away than fly and if they take wing, it is usually for a few meters only. This may be an adaptation to the fact that Socorro has no native terrestrial predators, but red-tailed hawks and great frigatebirds that not infrequently prey on mockingbird-sized birds.

This species feeds on small invertebrates, the remains of land crabs (Johngarthia planata) and fruit, namely of the endemic shrubs Ilex socorrensis and Sideroxylon socorrense, the latter of which has also become rare. Flies are pecked up but do not seem to be snatched out of the air. Like many Mimidae, the Socorro mockingbird is an aggressive, solitary species living alone or with its partner. When they come together at a plentiful food source – e.g. blowflies on a carcass – there is a marked social hierarchy between birds and rarely are more than two or three actively feeding; the less dominant birds hang around nearby, waiting for their turn.

The call is two medium followed by one lower whistle. Less often, a full song is given, consisting of a variable warbling tune, repeated several times as in many mockingbirds. It is not clear whether this species imitates other birds like its relatives do; in any case only the Socorro tropical parula, Socorro towhee and Socorro wren would seem to possess songs that might serve as models for the mockingbirds, and except the parula these are not often found in the mockingbird's core habitat.

=== Status and conservation ===
This species numbers fewer than 400 individuals altogether and is considered Critically Endangered by the IUCN. Mimus graysoni is mostly threatened by habitat loss caused by feral sheep and the locust Schistocerca piceifrons, and predation by feral cats which became established after 1953, probably in the early 1970s. It is not believed that the northern mockingbird which has colonized Socorro in the late 20th century is limiting the recovery of its relative; the two Mimus do not occupy the same habitat and even if they did, the native bird is larger and more powerful and would probably simply outcompete its mainland relative in native vegetation at least. The extermination of the sheep is underway in the hope of restoring the island ecosystem.

On one hand, it seems that the Socorro mockingbird is a prolific species and would be able to increase in numbers quickly if habitat improves. On the other hand, its terrestrial habits make it vulnerable to cat predation and this may limit its recovery even if sheep are contained; it is not known for example in how far foraging in the lowlands – now cat-ridden – was important for robust breeding success. In addition, it can be expected that predation on this species by both the native red-tailed hawk as well as the feral cats has increased since the Socorro dove – formerly a preferred prey item – has become extinct in the wild. Cerro Evermann, Socorro's main volcano, is still active and erupts on a limited scale every few decades; as the mockingbirds seem to depend on upland forest habitat, a major eruption could place the species in jeopardy (see also San Benedicto rock wren). This threat is not considered significant compared to the problem of introduced species however.
