= Sideroxylon socorrense =

Conservation status
- Vulnerable (IUCN 3.1)

Scientific classification
- Kingdom: Plantae
- Clade: Tracheophytes
- Clade: Angiosperms
- Clade: Eudicots
- Clade: Asterids
- Order: Ericales
- Family: Sapotaceae
- Genus: Sideroxylon
- Species: S. socorrense

Binomial name
- Sideroxylon socorrense (Brandegee) T.D.Penn. (1990)

Synonyms
- Bumelia socorrensis Brandegee (1901)

Species of tree

Sideroxylon socorrense is a plant species in the family Sapotaceae. It is endemic to Mexico, native to Socorro Island in the Revillagigedo Islands and to the Pacific coast states of Sinaloa and Nayarit on the Mexican mainland.

On its island home, this small tree grows in habitat that is at least seasonally humid. This restricts it mainly to a belt of woodland between 650 and 900 m above mean sea level, except on the northern side where wetter conditions predominate. It is classified as Vulnerable by the IUCN due to the adverse effects of introduced sheep grazing and the twice-yearly swarming of the locust Schistocerca piceifrons, a non-native pest that has become established on Socorro more recently.

The fruits of this plant are among the favorite foods of the nearly-extinct Socorro mockingbird (Mimus graysoni) and the Socorro dove (Zenaida graysoni) which presently only survives in captivity. Similar as in other Sideroxylon, these birds might be crucial for the present species' reproduction.
