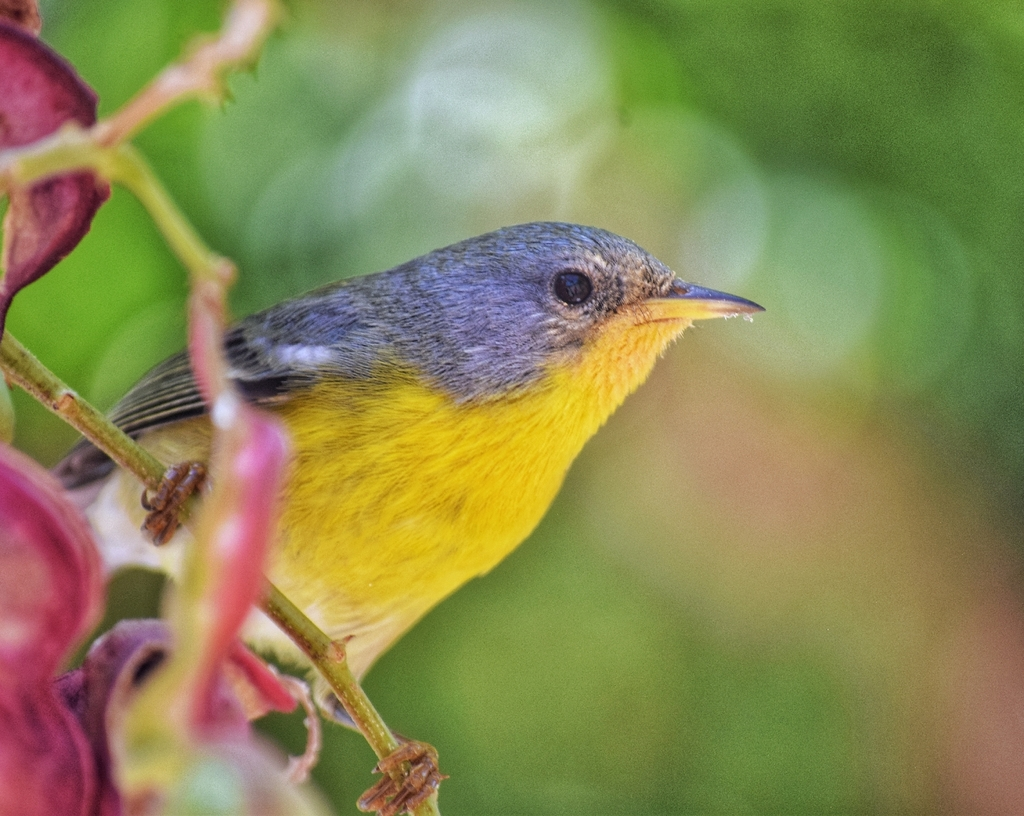

Conservation status
- Near Threatened (IUCN 3.1)

Scientific classification
- Kingdom: Animalia
- Phylum: Chordata
- Class: Aves
- Order: Passeriformes
- Family: Parulidae
- Genus: Setophaga
- Species: S. pitiayumi
- Subspecies: S. p. graysoni

Trinomial name
- Setophaga pitiayumi graysoni (Ridgway, 1887)

= Socorro parula =

Subspecies of bird

The Socorro parula (Setophaga pitiayumi graysoni) is a small New World warbler. A subspecies of the widespread Central and South American tropical parula (S. pitiayumi), it is endemic to the island of Socorro in the Revillagigedo Archipelago west of Mexico.

It is considered a separate species (Setophaga graysoni) by some authorities, notably the IUCN and BirdLife International.

== Description ==
The Socorro parula is distinguished by being relatively dull compared to other subspecies of tropical parula, being plain yellow rather than rich orange-yellow on its breast. Its upperparts are predominantly dull slate-gray, sometimes appearing as olive in females, with the back being a dull olive-green. The lores are a dull gray.

The wing bars are narrow and indistinct, particularly in females, where they may be nearly absent. The underparts are composed of yellow and white, both of which are noticeably duller than in other subspecies. White markings on the outer tail feathers are greatly reduced, typically forming only a narrow edging, although in some males a small white spot may be present.

It is similar in overall size to other subspecies of tropical parula, around 11 cm (4.3 in) long. The wing length of the subspecies is approximately 53–56 mm (2.1–2.2 in) and a tail length of 48–51 mm (1.9–2.0 in).
