= Socorro Island =

Volcanic island off the west coast of Mexico

Socorro
Native name: Isla Socorro
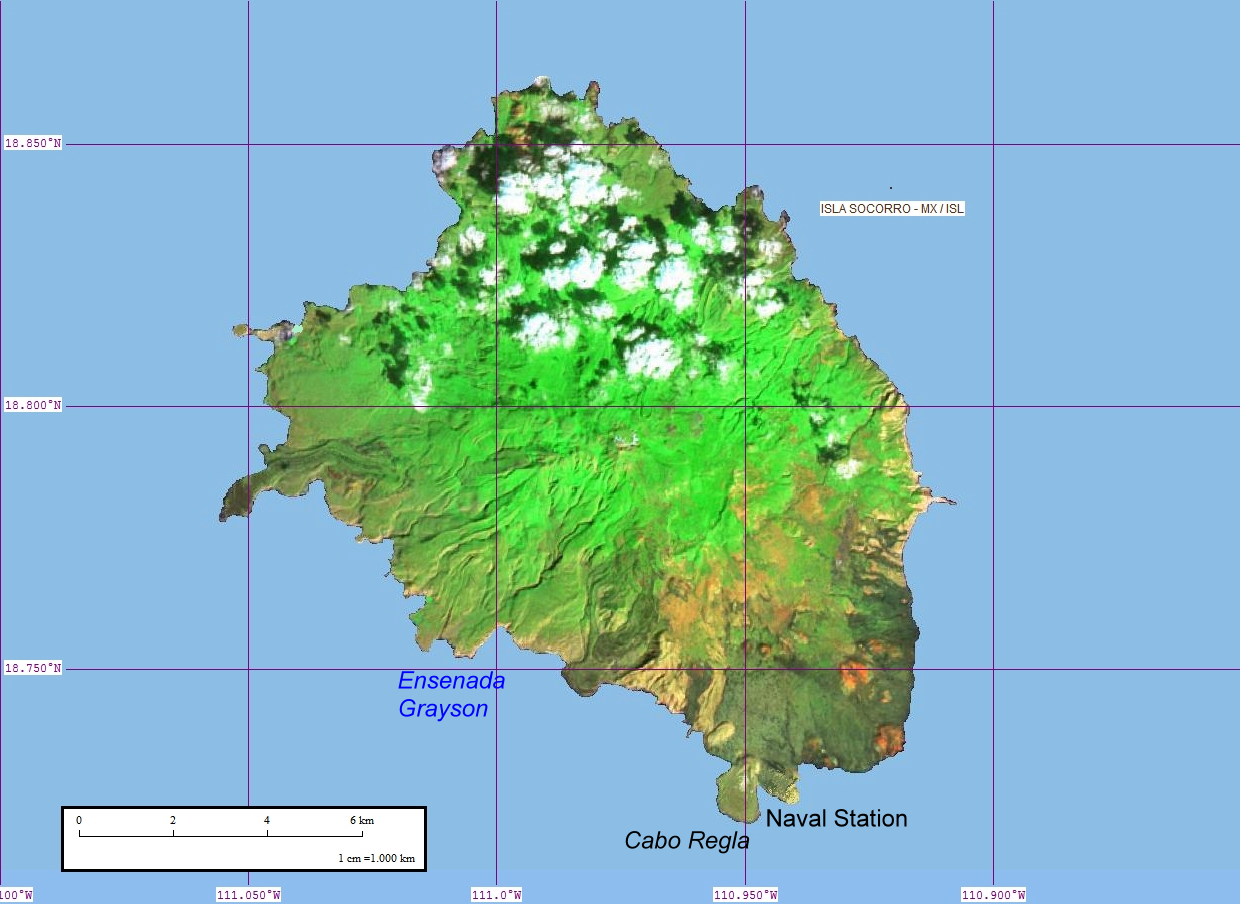
- Socorro Island, from satellite image

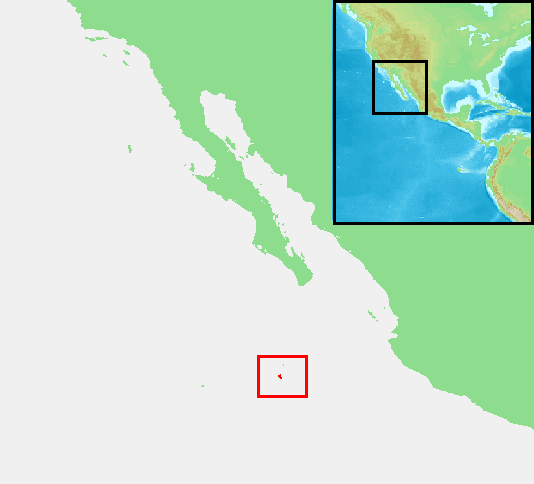

- Location in Mexico

Geography
- Location: Pacific Ocean
- Coordinates: 18°47′04″N 110°58′30″W
- Archipelago: Revillagigedo Islands
- Area: 132 km^{2} (51 sq mi)
- Length: 16.5 km (10.25 mi)
- Width: 11.5 km (7.15 mi)
- Highest elevation: 1,150 m (3770 ft)
- Highest point: Mount (Cerro) Evermann

Administration
- Mexico
- State: Colima

Demographics
- Population: 250
- Pop. density: 0.34/km^{2} (0.88/sq mi)

Socorro Island (Spanish: Isla Socorro) is a volcanic island in the Revillagigedo Islands, a Mexican possession lying 600 kilometres (370 mi) off the country's western coast. The size is 16.5 by 11.5 km (10.3 by 7.1 mi), with an area of 132 km^{2} (51 sq mi). It is the largest of the four islands of the Revillagigedo Archipelago. The last eruption was in 1993.

== Geology ==
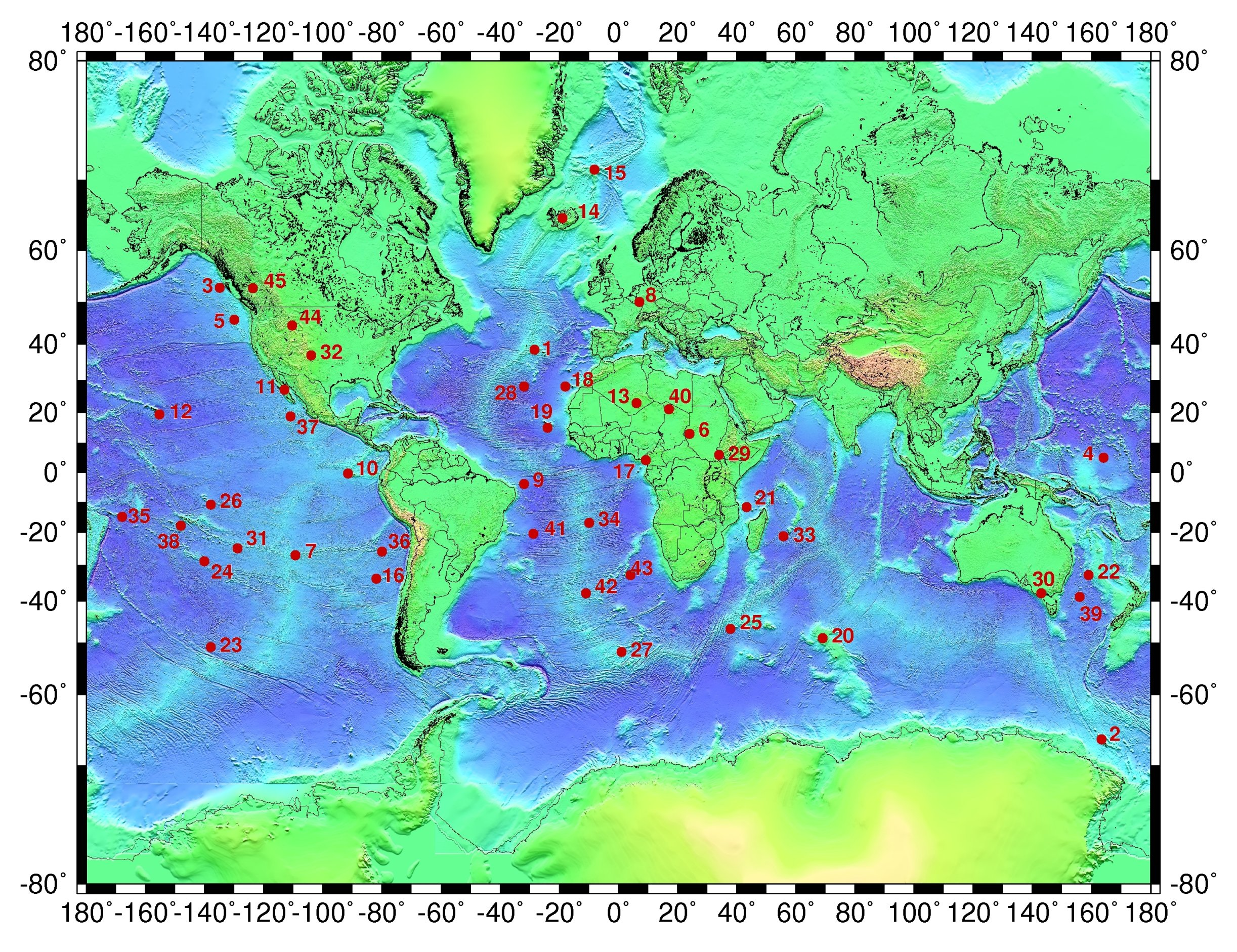
Map of hotspots. The Socorro hotspot is marked 37 on map.

The island rises abruptly from the sea to 1,050 meters (3,440 feet) in elevation at its summit. Socorro Island is the emerged summit of a massive, predominantly submarine shield volcano.

The island is part of the northern Mathematicians Ridge, a mid-ocean ridge that became largely inactive 3.5 million years ago when activity moved to the East Pacific Rise. All four islands along with the many seamounts on the ridge are post-abandonment alkaline volcanoes. Socorro Island is unusual in that it is the only dominantly silicic peralkaline volcanic island in the Pacific Ocean.

It most recently erupted in late January and early February 1993, which was a submarine flank eruption off the coast from Punta Tosca. An earlier eruption was on May 21, 1951; earlier eruptions probably occurred in 1905, 1896 and 1848. The initial volcanic event probably occurred in 3090 BC ±500 years. Mount Evermann (Spanish: Cerro Evermann) is the name given to the summit dome complex, in honor of ichthyologist Barton Warren Evermann. The island's surface is broken by furrows, small craters, and numerous ravines, and covered in lava domes, lava flows and cinder cones.

There are eight bays surrounding Socorro: three on the southern end of island – Vargas Lozano, Braithwaite, and Lucio Gallardo Pavon; Ensenada Grayson on the southwest; Blanca on the northwest with two inlets separated by a rocky outcropping; and North Bay on the island's north end with two inlets separated by a volcanic formation.

There is a naval station, established in 1957, with a population of 250 (staff and families), living in a village with a church, that stands on the western side of Bahía Vargas Lozano, a small cove with a rocky beach, about 800 meters (870 yards) east of Cabo Regla, the southernmost point of the island. The station is served by a dock, a local helipad and Isla Socorro airport, located six kilometers to the north. There is a fresh water spring about 5 kilometers (3.1 miles) northwest of Cabo Regla, at the shoreline of Ensenada Grayson (or Caleta Grayson). This is brackish and sometimes covered by the sea at high tide. In the 1950s, a small freshwater seep was known to exist some 45 meters (49 yards) inland at Bahía Lucio Gallardo Pavon (Binner's Cove), 800 meters (870 yards) northwest of the naval station.

In 1996, multiple sources of surface water above 60°C (140 F) were observed.

== History ==
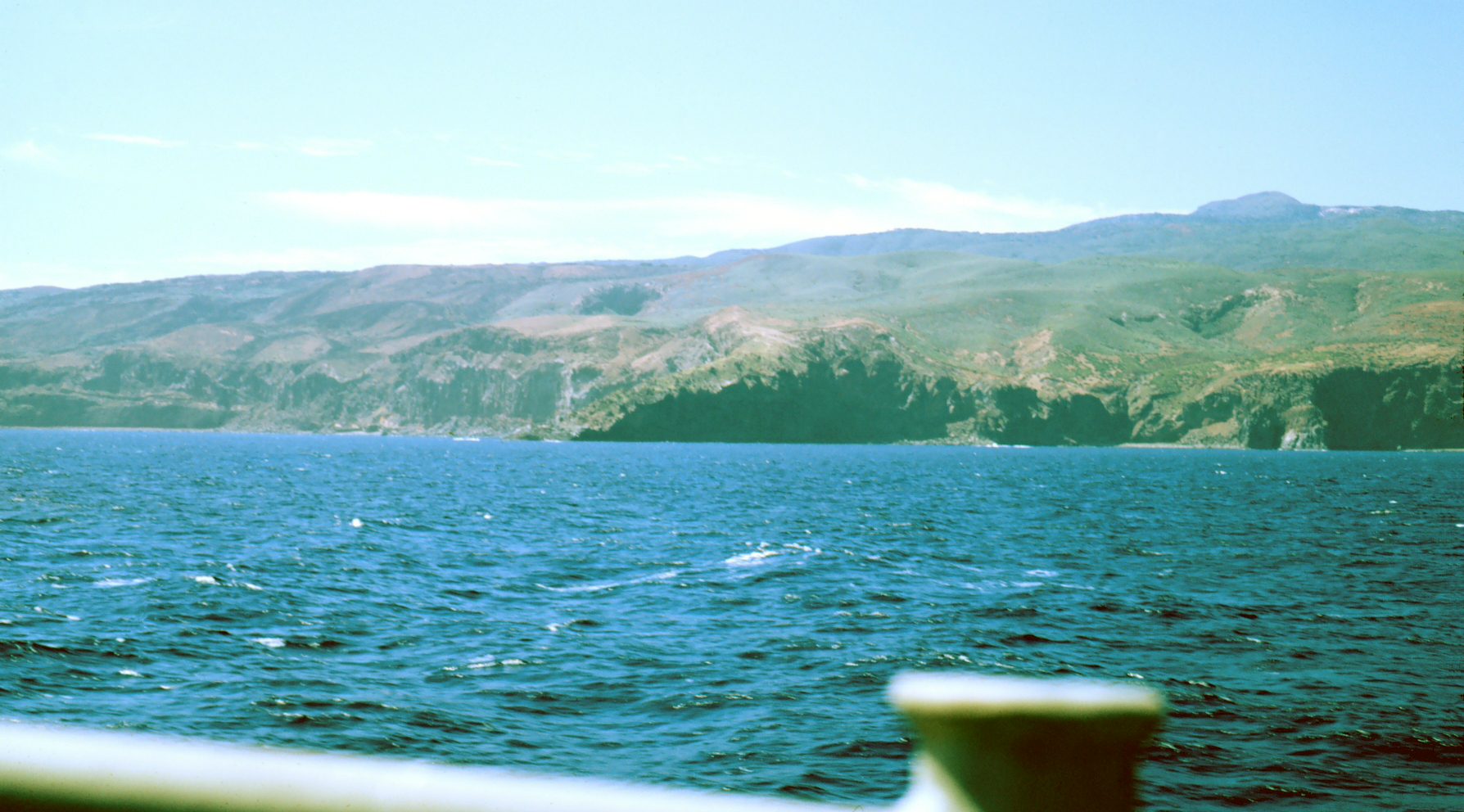
Offshore Socorro Island

No evidence of human habitation on Socorro exists before its discovery by Spanish explorer Hernando de Grijalva and his crew on 19 December 1533, who named it Santo Tomás ("St Thomas Island"; French: Isle St Thomas). In 1542, Ruy López de Villalobos, whilst exploring new routes across the Pacific, rediscovered Inocentes and renamed it Isla Anublada ("Cloudy Island") due to the clouds frequently forming on the northern slopes of Mount Evermann, and again in 1608, Martín Yañez de Armida, in charge of another expedition, visited Santo Tomás and changed its name to Isla Socorro after Our Lady of Perpetual Help (Virgen del Perpetuo Socorro).

At the beginning of the twentieth century, Barton Warren Evermann, director of the California Academy of Sciences in San Francisco promoted the scientific exploration of the island. The most comprehensive biological collections were obtained at this time. The volcano on Socorro was renamed in his honour.

Archie Smith, an American labourer from San Diego, was marooned on the island for one month in 1929 before being rescued by a passing fishing boat. This was because the expedition that brought him to the island to shear wild sheep returned to port for supplies, but went bankrupt and could not return.

On 12 September 1997, Hurricane Linda passed near the island near peak intensity causing minor damage to meteorological instruments on the island.

== Ecology ==
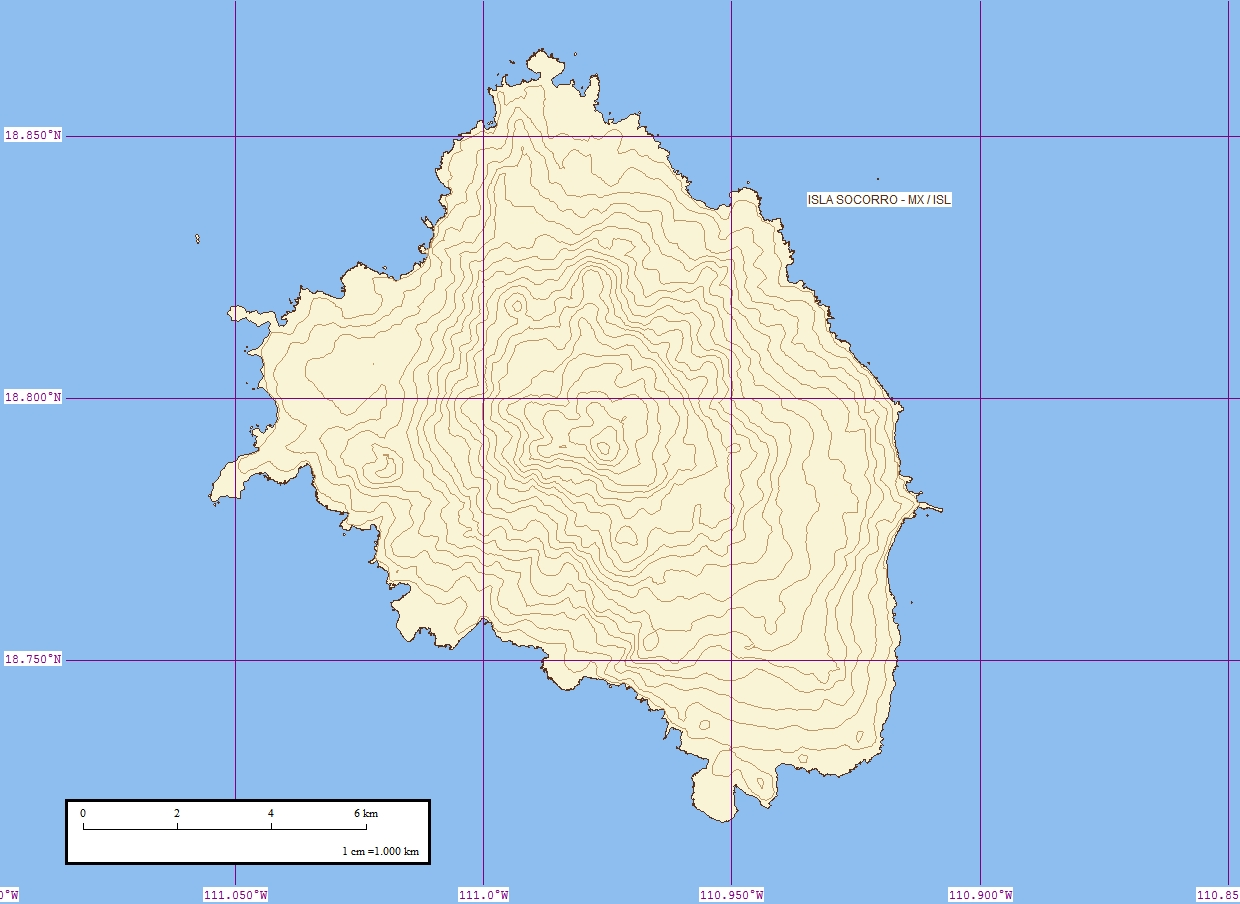
Map of Socorro Island

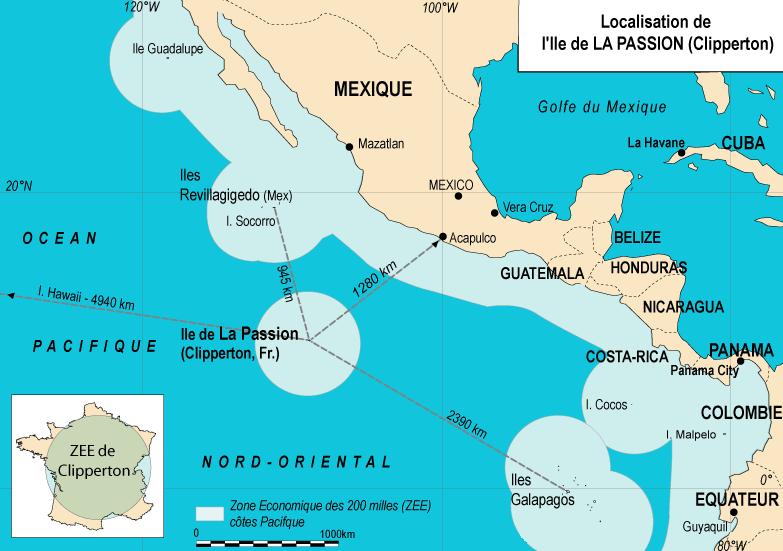
Location of Socorro Island and the rest of the Revillagigedo Archipelago, and extent of Mexico's western EEZ in the Pacific

The lowlands of Socorro – except on the northern, more humid side – are covered with thick shrubland, consisting mainly of endemic Croton masonii and a cactus, probably Engelmann's prickly pear (Opuntia engelmannii). Above 650 metres (2,130 ft) and on the northern side, a richer vegetation occurs. This includes small trees such as Ficus cotinifolia, black cherry (Prunus serotina (Note: Probably ssp. capuli according to biogeography, Brattstrom & Howell (1956) contra CMICD (2007))), and the endemic Guettarda insularis, which bear epiphytic orchids (Epidendrum nitens, E. rigidum and the endemic Pleurothallis unguicallosa).

The native land fauna is depauperate, with birds predominating and mammals absent. There is one endemic species of iguanid lizard (Urosaurus auriculatus) and the land crab Johngarthia oceanica, which also occurs on Clipperton Island.

Sheep, cats, and rodents were introduced to the island by human activity; more recently, the locust Schistocerca piceifrons has also established itself on the island. Unlike the mammals on Guadalupe Island or Clarión, their impact on the local flora was minor, but cat predation has had a drastic effect since the mid-1970s due to the fauna's island tameness, and the locusts that swarm twice a year seriously damage vegetation during that time. There have been no recorded extinctions of plants on Socorro; several birds have been drastically affected by cat predation however, and one taxon, the Socorro dove, has gone extinct in the wild.

Socorro is an important breeding location for several seabirds, many of which have here one of their northernmost breeding colonies. The present status of these birds is not well known, and they presumably have suffered from cat predation. In 1953, the following taxa were present:

- Wedge-tailed shearwater, Puffinus pacificus (or Ardenna pacifica)
- Western red-billed tropicbird, Phaethon aethereus mesonauta – breeding suspected but not verified
- Nazca booby, Sula granti – breeding suspected but not verified
- Northeast Pacific brown booby, Sula leucogaster brewsteri – breeding suspected but not verified
- East Pacific great frigatebird, Fregata minor ridgwayi – breeding suspected but not verified; a doubtfully distinct subspecies
- East Pacific sooty tern, Onychoprion fuscatus crissalis – a doubtfully distinct subspecies
- East Pacific brown noddy, Anous stolidus ridgwayi

Other than the endemic species, many of the landbirds and shorebirds occur mostly as vagrants or use the island as a stopover during migration; the northern mockingbird became established in the late 20th century. Among those that are recorded not infrequently are great blue heron, Hudsonian curlew, spotted sandpiper and wandering tattler. Unlike the situation on smaller and more isolated Clarión, wind-blown or vagrant birds seem to constitute the bulk of the recorded species, including brown pelican, osprey, peregrine falcon, semipalmated plover, willet, sanderling, belted kingfisher and buff-bellied pipit. It may be that this puzzling observation is due to the presence of the red-tailed hawks and cats, which has at least made the local Urosaurus warier than its relative on Clarión, and might deter passing birds from stopping on Socorro.

=== Endemism ===
Being the largest of the Revillagigedo Islands and closer to mainland than Clarion, Socorro sports a rich array of endemic taxa, mainly plants and landbirds as well as lizards. Some are threatened due to the presence of feral cats.

==== Animals ====
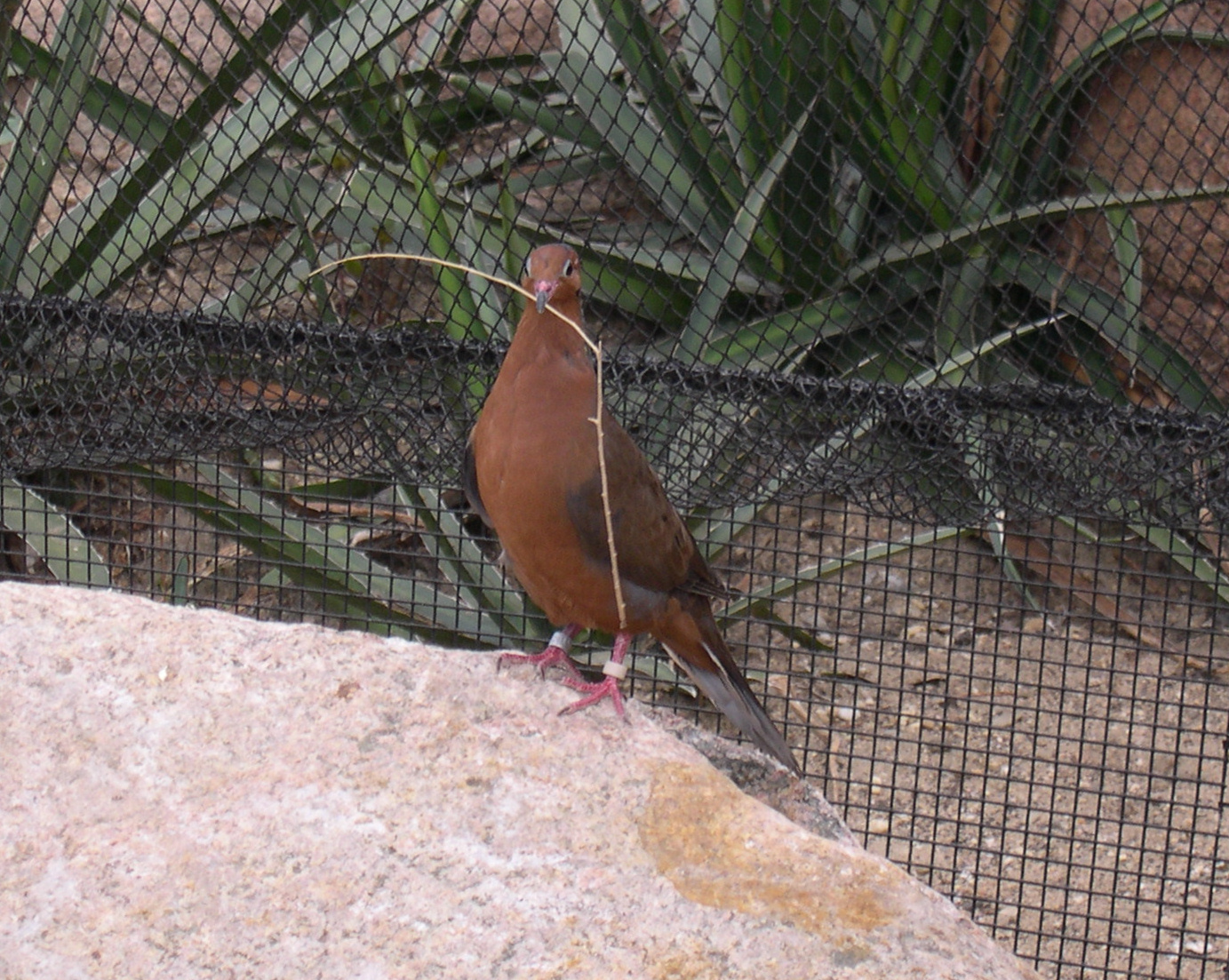
The Socorro dove (Zenaida graysoni) only survives in captivity at present.

- Socorro parakeet, Aratinga brevipes (endangered)
- Socorro red-tailed hawk, Buteo jamaicensis socorroensis
- Socorro common ground dove, Columbina passerina socorroensis
- Socorro elf owl, Micrathene whitneyi graysoni (probably extinct since c. 1970)
- Socorro mockingbird, Mimodes graysoni (critically endangered)
- Socorro yellow-crowned night heron, Nycticorax violaceus gravirostris (or Nyctanassa violacea gravirostris)
- Socorro tropical parula, Parula pitiayumi graysoni
- Socorro towhee, Pipilo (maculatus) socorroensis
- Townsend's shearwater, Puffinus auricularis (critically endangered; recently extirpated from San Benedicto and probably Clarión)
- Socorro wren, Troglodytes sissonii (near threatened)
- Socorro dove, Zenaida graysoni (extinct in the wild)
- Urosaurus auriculatus (endangered)

==== Plants ====
According to Plants of the World Online there are 21 species of plant that are strictly endemic to the island.

- Acianthera unguicallosa
- Aristida vaginata
- Aristolochia socorroensis
- Bidens socorrensis
- Botrychium socorrense
- Cestrum pacificum
- Citharexylum danirae
- Coreocarpus insularis
- Croton masonii
- Eremosis littoralis
- Erigeron socorrensis
- Guettarda insularis
- Ilex socorroensis
- Meliosma nesites
- Muhlenbergia solisii
- Paspalum longum
- Peperomia socorronis
- Physalis mimulus
- Salvia pseudomisella
- Triumfetta socorrensis
- Verbena sphaerocarpa

In addition there are five more species that are endemic to the Revillagigedo Archipelago growing on both Socorro and one of the other islands.

- Spermacoce nesiotica
- Bulbostylis nesiotica
- Cyperus duripes
- Nicotiana stocktonii
- Perityle socorrosensis

There are also an endemic variety of paintbrush flower, Castilleja bryantii var. socorrensis, and a subspecies named Lepechinia hastata subsp. socorrensis in addition to other species that are native, but not endemic.

== Visiting information ==
Socorro Island is a popular scuba diving destination known for underwater encounters with dolphins, sharks, manta rays and other pelagic animals. Divers visit here on liveaboard dive vessels. The most popular months are between November and May when the weather and seas are calmer. November to December are popular months to visit for a good chance to dive with whale sharks. January and February are popular months to scuba dive with humpback whales as they are then migrating through the Revillagigedo archipelago.

== See also ==
- List of volcanoes in Mexico
