= Aristolochia socorroensis =

Scientific classification
- Kingdom: Plantae
- Clade: Tracheophytes
- Clade: Angiosperms
- Clade: Magnoliids
- Order: Piperales
- Family: Aristolochiaceae
- Genus: Aristolochia
- Species: A. socorroensis

Binomial name
- Aristolochia socorroensis Pfeifer

Plant species in the birthwort family

Aristolochia socorroensis is an island endemic species from the Mexican Socorro Island, one of the Pacific Revillagigedo Islands. It is a species of pipevine in the birthwort family.

== Description ==
Aristolochia socorroensis is a perennial plant that grows herbaceous stems that trail along the ground without rooting. Its leaves are hastate, shaped like an arrow head with the two lobes at the base pointing outward. The tip of the leaf is strongly pointed while the base is deeply indented like the top of a heart shape while the leaf edges are smooth. Each leaf measures from 3 to 5 centimeters long and 1.5 to 4 cm in width. They are green in color and strigulose, covered in short, stiff hairs that lay down on the surface of the leaf. Their undersides are more pale with short, stiff hairs that stand up. They are attached to the plant by petioles, short leaf stems 1 to 1.5 cm long.

Each flower is solitary and found in the leaf axils, just above the joint where the petiole attaches to the main stem. The flower is a narrow tube coming to a drawn out point that is green and covered in brown speckles on the inside. The tube of the flower is straight and just 6 to 8 millimeters long and 1.5 mm in diameter. The flowers have five stigmas and five anthers within the tube of the flower.

The fruit is a sausage shaped capsule 2.75 cm long and 1.75 cm wide and five internal cells. The numerous seeds are black, triangular, about 5 mm wide, but just 1 mm thick.

== Taxonomy ==
Aristolochia socorroensis was named and scientifically described by Howard William Pfeifer in 1970. It is classified in the genus Aristolochia in family Aristolochiaceae. It has no botanical synonyms, subspecies, or varieties. Though collected by previous expeditions to the island as early as 1890 it had not been recognized as a species and been recorded as Aristolochia brevipies, a mainland Mexican species.

== Range and habitat ==
This species is endemic to Socorro Island in the Pacific Ocean to the west of Mexico. They have been observed at elevations from 14 to 800 meters on the island.

It grows in thickets of the shrub Croton masonii, along sea bluffs, and upper beaches.
