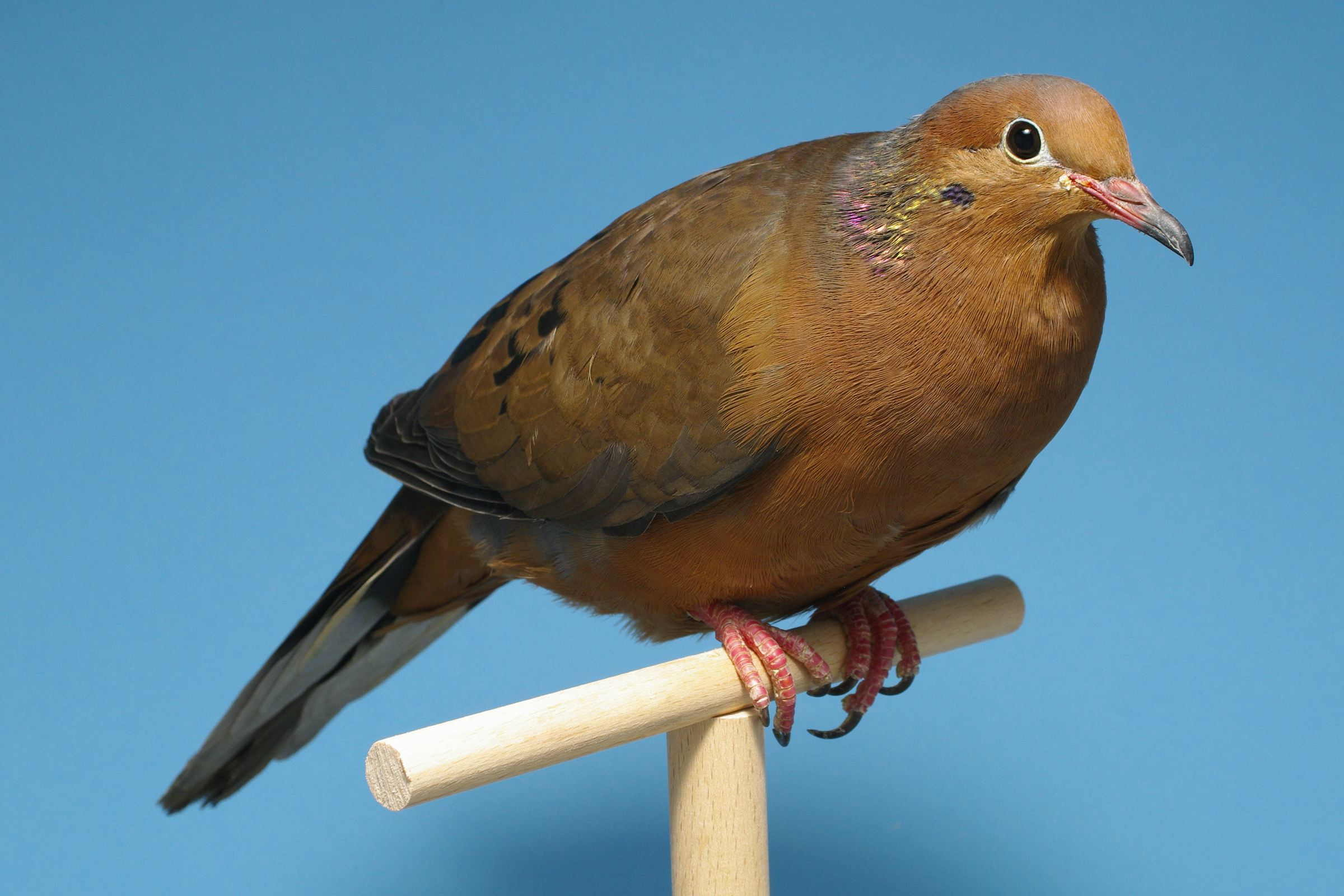
- Prize-winning animal of the German Bird Association

Conservation status
- Extinct in the Wild (IUCN 3.1)

Scientific classification
- Kingdom: Animalia
- Phylum: Chordata
- Class: Aves
- Order: Columbiformes
- Family: Columbidae
- Genus: Zenaida
- Species: Z. graysoni

Binomial name
- Zenaida graysoni (Lawrence, 1871)

Synonyms
- Zenaida macroura graysoni

= Socorro dove =

Species of bird

The Socorro dove or Grayson's dove (Zenaida graysoni) is a dove species which is extinct in the wild. It was endemic to Socorro Island in the Revillagigedo Islands off the west coast of Mexico. The last sighting in its natural habitat was in 1972 and it survives only in captivity. A reintroduction program is being prepared.

It is a close relative of the mourning and eared doves, particularly the former, and was at one time considered a subspecies. In captivity, it hybridizes with the former and almost all privately owned birds as well as several of the captive breeding program birds are known or strongly suspected to be hybrids. These are excluded from the reintroduction program as there is evidence of unique adaptations in the Socorro species. The scientific name commemorates Zénaïde Laetitia Julie Bonaparte and the American ornithologist and artist Andrew Jackson Grayson.

== Description ==
- Zenaida
  - - White-winged dove (Z. asiatica)
    - West Peruvian dove (Z. meloda)
  - - Zenaida dove (Z. aurita)
    - - Eared dove (Z. auriculata)
      - - Socorro dove (Z. graysoni)
        - Mourning dove (Z. macroura)

Cladogram showing the relationships of six species of doves in the genus Zenaida. This study did not include the Galápagos dove (Z. galapagoensis).

The Socorro dove is a medium-sized, principally terrestrial dove with long legs for a zenaida dove. It is 26.5–34 cm (10.4–13.4 in) long and weighs 190 g (6.7 oz) on average. In overall color pattern, it agrees with its relatives. It is considered to be a stronger-colored insular representative of the mourning dove. The male is deep cinnamon on its head and underparts, with an ear streak like its relatives. The nape is blue-grey and the neck has an iridescent pink patch, most prominent after moult. The upperparts are rufous brown. Female and juvenile coloration is slightly duller. The most conspicuous differences from the mourning dove, darker coloration and more well-developed feet, were useful amid the dark lava rock and the shady forests of its island home, where native mammalian predators were absent but constant threats from red-tailed hawks and great frigatebirds were present. The advertising call begins with a disyllabic coo, followed by three single calls, and ends with another disyllabic coo: "Coo-oo, OO, OO, OO, Coo-oo". Each of these five elements takes a little less than one second.

The arid and fairly barren Clarión Island, some 400 km (250 mi) west of Socorro, has an endemic subspecies of the mourning dove, Zenaida macroura clarionensis. These birds are roughly intermediate in appearance between the Socorro dove and the mainland mourning doves. It is highly likely that they represent a later colonization by mourning doves (rather than earlier stock), which evolved its phenotype independently from but in parallel with the Socorro birds. This would mean that predation by great frigatebirds is significant enough to select towards a cryptic darkening of the plumage, as these are the only predators of Z. m. clarionensis. On a semidesert island such as Clarión, birds would be expected to evolve towards lighter plumage, to better withstand the heat and lack of reliable freshwater sources, in accordance with Gloger's Rule.

The upper elevation limit of the doves is 950 m (3,120 ft) .

== Ecology ==
There is marked behavioral difference to the mourning dove. When Andrew Jackson Grayson discussed the species, he called it the "solitary dove" because he never saw more than one male and one female together. The doves, particularly the adult males, chase away their young as soon as these can fend for their own and the partners split for the time being. This too is believed to be in adaptation to the former dominance of aerial predators, lest local concentrations of birds, let alone young, inexperienced ones, would present easy targets for the hawks. Typical of many birds on islands lacking mammals, Socorro doves also show little fear of humans or introduced predators, including cats, which proved a major factor in its extirpation.

The last habitat in which this dove was found is the low seasonally humid forest above 500 m (1,600 ft) ASL. Before the introduction of cats, it seasonally descended into the lowlands where it was "common" in March 1953 for example. It may be that this coincided with the peak of the breeding season, when many birds had dependent young and dispersed widely to gather more varied food. This was the case in the Socorro mockingbird, the other mid-sized native landbird of Socorro, which apparently has very similar habitat preferences.

Its last refuge was dominated by endemic Guettarda insularis, Ilex socorroensis and Sideroxylon socorrense, as well as black cherry (Prunus serotina), Ficus cotinifolia fig trees and Psidium socorrense guavas, apparently all native on Socorro. At least at the time of the last record, it seemed to be dependent on intact understorey of Euphorbiaceae (spurges and relatives) and ferns, maybe because cats hunt less efficiently in the dense foliage. It is frugivorous and, as is often the case in Columbidae, might have played an important role in the reproduction of the trees which dominate its habitat. One of these (S. socorrense) is classified as vulnerable by the IUCN. In particular, it was found to associate with the fig trees.

Virtually nothing is known about breeding in the wild. However, each generation is estimated to be about 6.6 years. Parallels in altitudinal migration with the equally solitary mockingbird might be taken as indication that the breeding activity peaked around March through April. In captivity, the female generally lays two white eggs in a nest box 1–2.5 metres (3 to 8 feet) above ground. The incubation lasts from 14 to 17 days, and the young birds fledge after around 14 to 20 days.

== Extinction in the wild ==
The primary reason for the extirpation of the Socorro dove is predation by feral cats, but other pressures may have also contributed. In 1856, sheep were introduced, which resulted in a major alteration to the vegetation of the island, turning most areas below 500 metres (1,600 ft) into open vegetation. This may have caused some decline in their numbers, but did not pose an existential risk to the species. However, in 1957, a military base was established on the island. The evidence found by Jehl and Parkes suggested that feral cats had been introduced at the time that the military base was established, which was ultimately the cause of the species' extinction. Two expeditions, in 1978 and 1981, failed to find the species, and it was declared extinct in the wild in 1983.

The species avoided complete extinction due to the collection of several doves by an expedition in 1925. The subsequent use of these doves in aviculture resulted in about one hundred doves being available for captive breeding programs, beginning in the late 1980s. The species reproduces no less willingly in captivity than other Zenaida doves, provided its different ecological needs are addressed. As of June 2026, the captive population numbered 180 birds across fewer than 50 zoos and other facilities. As of early 2006, it was being prepared to remove the sheep and to rid the island of cats. In the meantime, with the maintenance of the remaining birds, stock for reintroduction is being provided.

== Reintroduction efforts ==
In order to protect these birds and eventually reintroduce them into the wild, various reintroduction and conservation efforts have germinated. In 1994, the birds' native island of Socorro was declared a biosphere preserve. In addition, as the number of birds in captivity is only slightly above 100, various associations have begun breeding programs. These include the European Association of Zoos and Aquaria (EAZA) as well as zoos in Frankfurt and Cologne. In 2013, the breeding program was successfully introduced into Mexico by the EAZA in collaboration with various government agencies such as the SEMAR, SEMARNAT, and the Mexican Navy. At London Zoo in April 2025, eight Socorro dove chicks hatched.

=== Specific actions ===
Construction of aviaries on Socorro Island began in 2003. Avian Malaria and trichomoniasis were detected during screens of other dove populations on neighboring islands in December 2003 and January 2004. As a result, recommendations for protection of the reintroduction population were put forward. Construction of aviaries was completed in 2005. The same year, plans were outlined to assess the level of soil erosion on Socorro as a result of vegetation loss. In 2006, there was an outbreak of avian influenza in Europe, and therefore 12 doves were sent to Albuquerque Biological Park to create a separate reserve population. In 2008, the Edinburgh and Paignton Zoos sent 12 chicks from their breeding program to the Albuquerque Zoo as part of the collective aggregation effort. The original plan was to reintroduce the birds into Mexico in 2008, but was delayed due to import restrictions and permits, so a stock of viable individuals was kept in the US. In 2010, by using hunting and telemetry, all sheep had been eradicated from the island. The stock aggregated in the United States was finally transferred to Mexico in 2013. As of 2011, the problem of cats and house-mice has yet to be resolved on Socorro Island.

In addition to efforts to control cats, other animals, and human activity, such as ATV usage, on Socorro Island, efforts are also underway to control locust swarms on the island. Outbreaks of Schistocerca piceifrons have occurred at least twice a year on the island since 1994, and has resulted in damage to native flowers and vegetation.
