= Socorro wren =

Conservation status
- Near Threatened (IUCN 3.1)

Scientific classification
- Kingdom: Animalia
- Phylum: Chordata
- Class: Aves
- Order: Passeriformes
- Family: Troglodytidae
- Genus: Troglodytes
- Species: T. sissonii

Binomial name
- Troglodytes sissonii (Grayson, 1868)

Synonyms
- Thryothrorus sissonii (Grayson, 1868) Troglodytes insularis (Lawrence, 1871) Thyromanes insularis (Oberhosler, 1898)

Species of bird

The Socorro wren (Troglodytes sissonii) is a species of bird in the family Troglodytidae. It is endemic to Socorro Island, Mexico. It was formerly placed in Thryomanes but was moved to Troglodytes considering "manners, song, plumage, etc." and by biogeography and mitochondrial DNA sequence analysis of the MT-NADH dehydrogenase protein 2 gene.

Its natural habitats is the tropical arid Croton masonii–prickly pear (Note: Probably Engelmann's Prickly Pear (Opuntia engelmannii).) shrubland and occasionally the more humid forest. It appears to prefer this habitat, limiting its presence above 600 m (2,000 ft) although it does range over the whole island.

During visits in 1953, the birds were observed to be out of breeding season in mid-March; territorial males were observed in mid-late November.

The main limiting factors are by habitat destruction due to feral sheep and predation by feral cats. In 1953, it was noted to be unwary. However, the IUCN does not yet consider it threatened, because especially compared to the larger birds of Socorro, it has fared not too badly and remains among the most common local landbirds.
