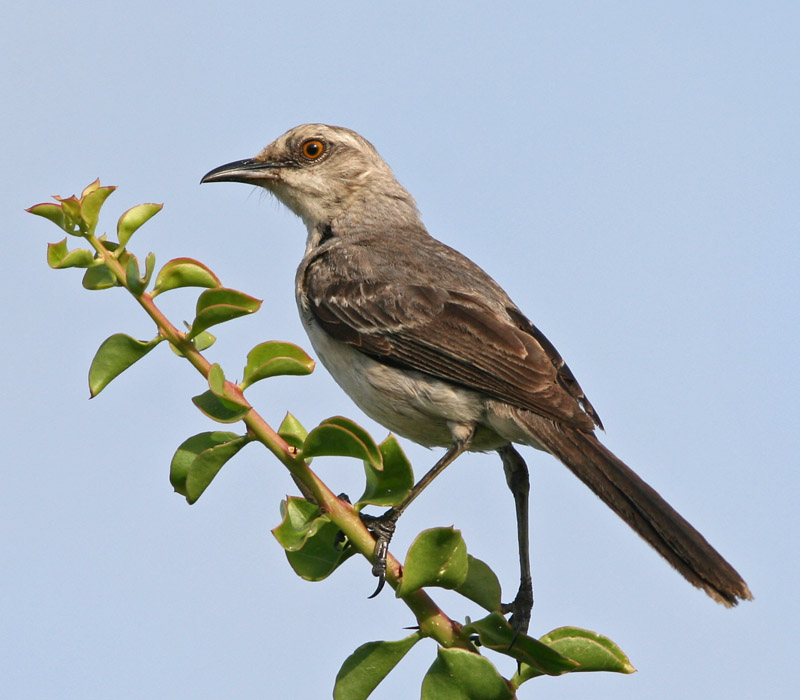

Conservation status
- Least Concern (IUCN 3.1)

Scientific classification
- Kingdom: Animalia
- Phylum: Chordata
- Class: Aves
- Order: Passeriformes
- Family: Mimidae
- Genus: Mimus
- Species: M. gilvus

Binomial name
- Mimus gilvus (Vieillot, 1808)

= Tropical mockingbird =

Species of bird

The tropical mockingbird (Mimus gilvus) is a resident breeding bird from southern Mexico to northern and eastern South America and in the Lesser Antilles and other Caribbean islands.

== Taxonomy and systematics ==
The tropical mockingbird has sometimes been considered conspecific with its closest living relative, the northern mockingbird (Mimus polyglottos) and forms a superspecies with it. The critically endangered Socorro mockingbird (M. graysoni) is also much closer to these two than previously believed.

The tropical mockingbird has these ten subspecies:

- M. g. gracilis Cabanis, 1851
- M. g. leucophaeus Ridgway, 1888
- M. g. antillarum Hellmayr & Seilern, 1915
- M. g. tobagensis Dalmas, 1900
- M. g. rostratus Ridgway, 1884
- M. g. melanopterus Lawrence, 1849
- M. g. gilvus (Vieillot, 1808)
- M. g. tolimensis Ridgway, 1904
- M. g. antelius Oberholser, 1919
- M. g. magnirostris Cory, 1887

M. g. antelius and M. g. magnirostris have been suggested as separate species but morphological and vocal evidence for the potential splits are weak.

== Description ==
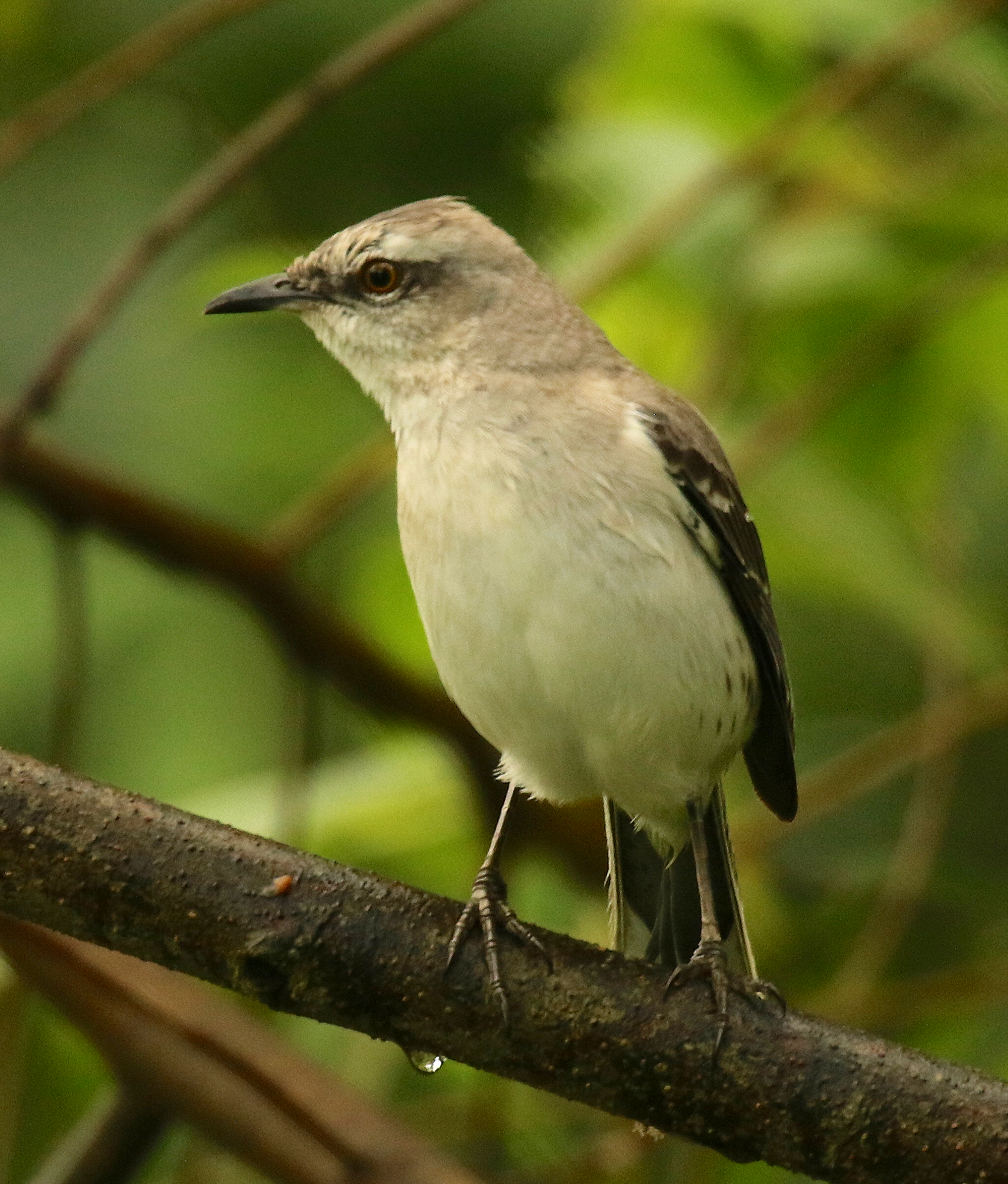
Asa Wright Nature Centre - Trinidad

Adult tropical mockingbirds are 23 to 25.5 cm (9.1 to 10.0 in) long. The mean weights of various subspecies vary greatly. Adults of the nominate subspecies are gray on the head and upper parts and have a whitish supercilium and a dark stripe through the eye. The underparts are off-white and the wings are blackish with two white wing bars and white edges to the flight feathers. They have a long dark tail with white feather tips, a slim black bill with a slight downward curve and long dark legs. Juveniles are browner and their chest and flanks have dusky streaks.

The subspecies vary in overall size and the length of wings and tail, the intensity of their plumage colors, the extent of pale markings, and eye color. M. g. magnirostris is the largest and has a significantly heavier bill than the others; M. g. tolimensis is also larger than the nominate.

== Distribution and habitat ==
The subspecies of the tropical mockingbird are distributed thus:

- M. g. gracilis, southern Mexico south to Honduras and El Salvador
- M. g. leucophaeus, the Yucatán Peninsula and Cozumel and other offshore islands
- M. g. antillarum, the Lesser Antilles from Antigua south
- M. g. tobagensis, Trinidad and Tobago
- M. g. rostratus, southern Caribbean islands from Aruba east to Blanquilla
- M. g. melanopterus, northern and northeastern Colombia, Venezuela, Guyana, and Brazil's Roraima state
- M. g. gilvus, Suriname and French Guiana
- M. g. tolimensis, western and central Colombia south to extreme northern Ecuador; El Salvador to Panama
- M. g. antelius, coastal northeastern and eastern Brazil south to Rio de Janeiro state
- M. g. magnirostris, San Andrés Island off eastern Nicaragua

The population of M. g. tolimensis in El Salvador, Nicaragua, Costa Rica, and Panama are descendants of escaped cage birds imported from Colombia.

The tropical mockingbird is common in most open habitats, including around human habitation. Examples include scrublands, savannas, parks, and farmlands. It avoids closed forests and mangroves. It is a bird of the lowlands to middle elevations; it reaches about 2,500 m (8,200 ft) in Central American and the northern Andes. It has been found as high as 2,600 m (8,500 ft) in Colombia and 3,100 m (10,200 ft) in northern Ecuador.

== Behavior ==
=== Feeding ===
The tropical mockingbird forages on the ground or low in vegetation; it also captures flying insects such as swarming termites on the wing. It is omnivorous; its diet includes a variety of arthropods (such as spiders, grasshoppers, and beetles), seeds, small fruits and berries, larger cultivated fruits (such as mangoes and sapodillas), lizards, bird and lizard eggs, the contents of bird feeders, and human food.

=== Breeding ===
The tropical mockingbird generally nests from late in the wet season through the transition period into the early wet season. During that long period, it often will produce three broods. It is monogamous but cooperative breeding has been recorded with the young of the previous brood acting as helpers. It aggressively defends its territory against birds of its own and other species, and predatory animals as well. Both sexes build the nest using coarse twigs lined with softer material and place it low in a shrub or tree. The clutch size ranges from two to four but is usually three. The female does most of the incubation during the 13- to 15-day period. Chicks are fed by both parents (and helpers) in the nest for up to 19 days and beyond that after fledging.

=== Vocalization ===
The tropical mockingbird's song is "a varied and long-continued sequence of diverse mellow to harsh notes, trills, with considerable repetition of phrases". It will often sing through the night. It apparently rarely mimics other species. Its calls include "a resonant 'pree-ew'" and "a harsh 'chick' or 'chek'".

== Status ==
The IUCN has assessed the tropical mockingbird as being of Least Concern. It is "common and conspicuous nearly throughout [its] range". Its range has expanded in some areas, such as northward in the Lesser Antilles, but has contracted in southeastern Brazil due to habitat loss and illegal trapping.
