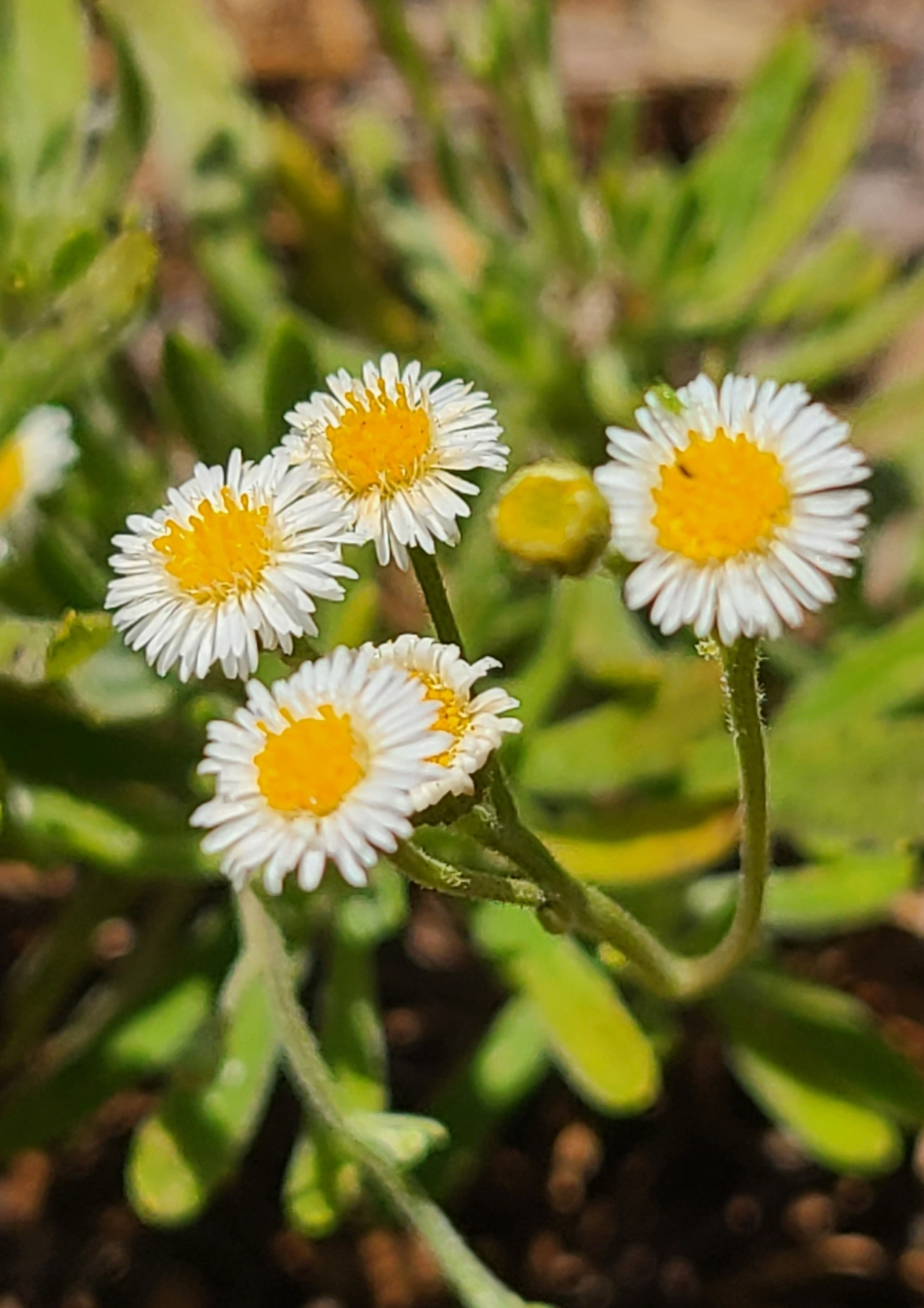

Scientific classification
- Kingdom: Plantae
- Clade: Tracheophytes
- Clade: Angiosperms
- Clade: Eudicots
- Clade: Asterids
- Order: Asterales
- Family: Asteraceae
- Genus: Erigeron
- Species: E. socorrensis

Binomial name
- Erigeron socorrensis Brandegee

= Erigeron socorrensis =

Species of flowering plant

Erigeron socorrensis is a Mexican species of flowering plant in the family Asteraceae known by the common name Socorro Island fleabane. It has been found only on Socorro Island in Mexico, part of the State of Colima. This is a small, volcanic island about 390 kilometres (240 miles) south-southwest of the southern end of the Peninsula of Baja California, the largest of the Revillagigedo Islands.

Erigeron socorrensis is a shrub up to 120 cm (3.9 ft) tall, with a large woody caudex. It has narrowly oblanceolate leaves up to 8 cm (3 in) long. One plant can produce several groups of small flower heads, each group at the end of a long, thin stalk. Each head is 3–4 mm (0.12–0.16 in) long, with several white ray florets surrounding several yellow disc florets.
