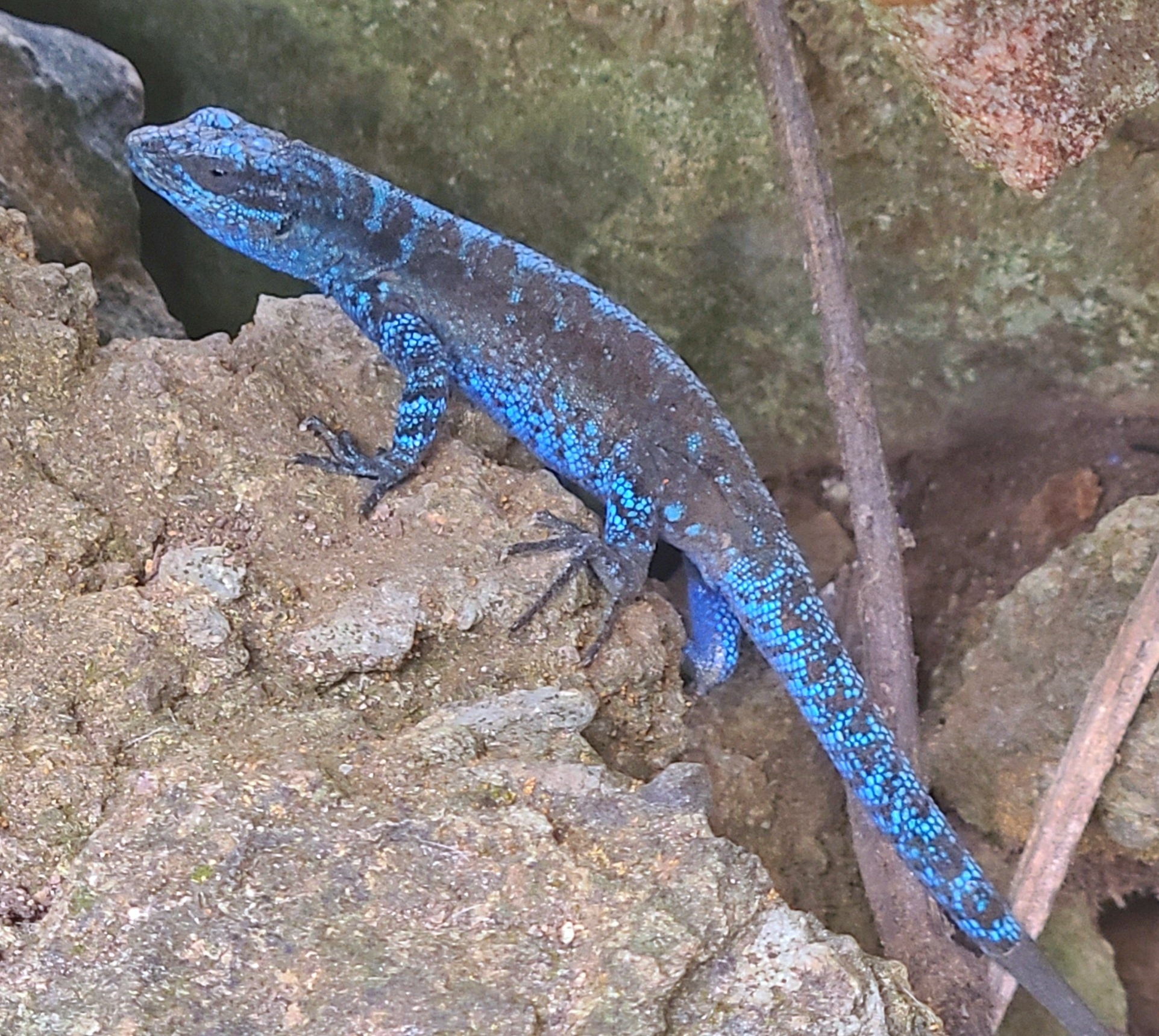

Conservation status
- Endangered (IUCN 3.1)

Scientific classification
- Domain: Eukaryota
- Kingdom: Animalia
- Phylum: Chordata
- Class: Reptilia
- Order: Squamata
- Suborder: Iguania
- Family: Phrynosomatidae
- Genus: Urosaurus
- Species: U. auriculatus

Binomial name
- Urosaurus auriculatus (Cope, 1871)

Synonyms
- Uta auriculata Cope, 1871

= Urosaurus auriculatus =

Species of lizard

Urosaurus auriculatus, also known as the Socorro Island tree lizard, is a species of lizard. It is endemic to Socorro Island, one of the Revillagigedo Islands off Baja California (Mexico). Urosaurus auriculatus is found through much of the island; it is absent from areas of erosion caused by overgrazing by sheep.

Adult lizards measure on average 66 mm (2.6 in) in snout–vent length. The species is oviparous.
