= Oenothera resicum =

Scientific classification
- Kingdom: Plantae
- Clade: Tracheophytes
- Clade: Angiosperms
- Clade: Eudicots
- Clade: Rosids
- Order: Myrtales
- Family: Onagraceae
- Genus: Oenothera
- Species: O. resicum

Binomial name
- Oenothera resicum Benavides, Kuethe, Ortiz-Alcaraz & León de la Luz

Species of flowering plant

Oenothera resicum is a species in the family Onagraceae, and the first record of this family in the Revillagigedo Archipelago, Mexican Pacific. Endemic to Isla Clarión.

== Distribution ==
The natural habitat of Oenothera resicum appears to be restricted to a single rocky outcrop atop the northern cliffs of Isla Clarión. This outcrop is geochemically distinct, characterized by high concentrations of magnesium oxide and glaucophane (Mg, Na), in contrast to the iron-rich outcrops found elsewhere on the island. The species' exclusive presence in this location suggests a strong ecological preference for this specific soil type, a factor that may be critical for future conservation efforts, particularly in cultivation.

== Description ==
Oenothera resicum is a perennial, ascending to procumbent subshrub, with mature individuals developing taproots. Its reddish stems, which may be simple or branched up to 50 cm, are strigose to nearly glabrous, lacking a basal rosette but bearing terminal rosettes with smaller leaves. The elliptic leaves have mucronate tips, cuneate bases, and conspicuously dentate margins, ranging from 0.5–3 × 0.3–1 cm in terminal rosettes and 2–6 × 1–1.5 cm along the stem. Flowers are solitary and axillary, with glabrous green to yellowish sepals (1.9–2.5 cm), four yellow petals fading red at the base, and a floral tube 2.5–3 cm long. The stigma has four linear lobes surrounded by eight stamens with 20 mm filaments and 6–8 mm anthers. The fruit is a four-celled, strigose to glabrescent capsule (5.5–8 cm long), containing ellipsoid seeds (0.8–1.2 mm) with a pitted surface. The species appears to be self-compatible, though its chromosome number remains unknown.

== Conservation status ==
Oenothera resicum is classified as Critically Endangered (CR) under IUCN criteria A2, B2ab (i, ii, iii), due to its extremely restricted range and small population. It is confined to a single outcrop of less than 50 m² atop unstable coastal cliffs on Isla Clarión, with fewer than 10 mature individuals recorded. Coastal erosion has likely destroyed much of its original habitat, and ongoing geological instability threatens the remaining population. Without immediate ex-situ conservation measures, the species faces imminent extinction in the wild.
