= Barton Warren Evermann =

American ichthyologist (1853–1932)

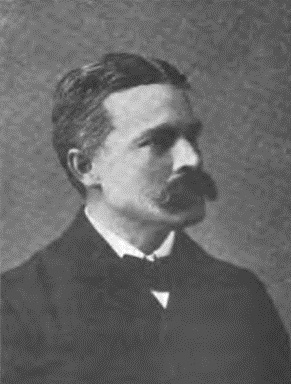
- Born: 24 October 1853; Monroe County, Iowa
- Died: 27 September 1932 (aged 78); Berkeley, California
- Education: Indiana University
- Employer(s): Indiana University; Stanford University; Cornell University; Yale University; California Academy of Sciences; United States Bureau of Fisheries

Barton Warren Evermann (October 24, 1853 – September 27, 1932) was an American ichthyologist.

== Early life and education ==
Evermann was born in Monroe County, Iowa in 1853. His family moved to Indiana while he was still a child and it was there that he grew up, completed his education, and married. Evermann graduated from Indiana University in 1886.

== Career ==
For 10 years, he served as teacher and superintendent of schools in Indiana and California. While teaching in Carroll County, Indiana Evermann met fellow teacher Meadie Hawkins. They married on October 24, 1875, and had a son, Toxaway Bronte (born 1879) and a daughter, Edith (born 1894). He was professor of biology at the Indiana State University in Terre Haute from 1886 to 1891. He lectured at Stanford University in 1893–1894, at Cornell University in 1900–1903, and at Yale University in 1903–1906.

In the early 20th century, as director of the California Academy of Sciences in San Francisco, he promoted research on the Revillagigedo Islands off the Pacific coast of Mexico. Mount Evermann on Socorro Island, the highest peak of the archipelago, was named in his honor. A species of lizard, Anolis evermanni, is named in his honor.

In 1888, Evermann entered the service of the United States Bureau of Fisheries, became an ichthyologist in 1891, had charge of the division of scientific inquiry in 1903–1911, and from 1910 to 1914, was chief of the Alaska Fisheries Service. Evermann was fur seal commissioner in 1892 and became chairman of the fur seal board in 1908.

Evermann died in Berkeley, California, aged 78.

== See also ==
- Category:Taxa named by Barton Warren Evermann
