= Andrew J. Grayson =

American ornithologist and painter

Andrew Jackson Grayson
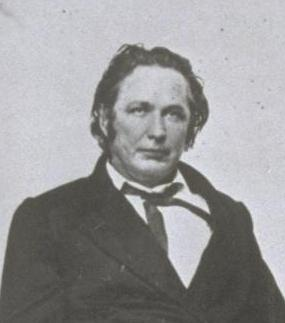
- Born: August 20, 1819; Louisiana
- Died: August 17, 1869 (aged 49); Mazatlan, Mexico
- Known for: Birds of the Pacific Slope
- Spouse: Frances J. Timmons
- Scientific career
- Fields: Ornithology, Art

Andrew Jackson Grayson (1819–1869) was an American ornithologist and artist.

Grayson was the author of Birds of the Pacific Slope (1853–69), which he considered to be a completion of John James Audubon's Birds of America.

== Early life and education ==
Grayson was born August 20, 1819, in the northwest corner of Louisiana, on the Ouachita River, where his father had a cotton plantation. Later on, his father sent him to St. Mary's College in St. Louis, Missouri. There, they discouraged him from studying art.

He developed a talent for drawing the birds he observed in the bayous while in his teens. However, he was once punished by a schoolteacher for drawing instead of doing his lessons. Admonished by his father, he stopped drawing birds for the next 25 years.

== Moving west ==
After his father died, Mr. Grayson used his inherited funds to invest in a small store. As he ignored it for the most part it went out of business fairly quickly. After meeting frontiersmen in his college years, he developed an insatiable urge to move west. After he married his wife, Frances J. Timmons, on July 21, 1842, they decided to move to California. They had a child in 1845, Edward B. Grayson, and moved to St. Louis to begin the journey. In April 1846, Grayson led a party of migrants out of Independence, Missouri. Other groups joined along the way. At Fort Bridger, a conman, L. W. Hastings, persuaded one of the groups to take a shortcut through a mountain pass. They ended up being the Donner Party.

The party Grayson led reached Fort Hall, Idaho. In between there and California, Grayson lost half his group. In late 1846, they reached San Francisco.

== Early California days ==
Once Grayson settled in San Francisco, he instantly joined a military group led by Mariano Guadalupe Vallejo. During this given period of time, he became a colonel. After he came back from the war, he took no breaks in settling down. He invested in several San Franciscan business ventures, and established the town of Grayson along the San Joaquin river. However, because he had no interest in business, most of these ventures failed.

== Taxa named after Grayson ==
Two bird species and several other taxa have been named in honor of Grayson. They are mainly from the Revillagigedo Islands and other islands offshore Pacific Mexico. As with much island fauna, several are endangered or extinct:

Birds:

- Micrathene whitneyi graysoni - Socorro elf owl (probably extinct since c. 1970)
- Mimus graysoni - Socorro mockingbird (critically endangered)
- Parula pitiayumi graysoni - Socorro tropical parula
- Zenaida graysoni - Socorro dove (extinct in the wild)

Other:

- Cambarus graysoni - a Cambaridae crayfish
- Ochrotrichia graysoni - a Hydroptilidae caddisfly
- Sylvilagus graysoni - Tres Marias cottontail rabbit (endangered)
