= Revillagigedo Islands =

Volcanic archipelago in the Pacific Ocean

Native name: Islas Revillagigedo
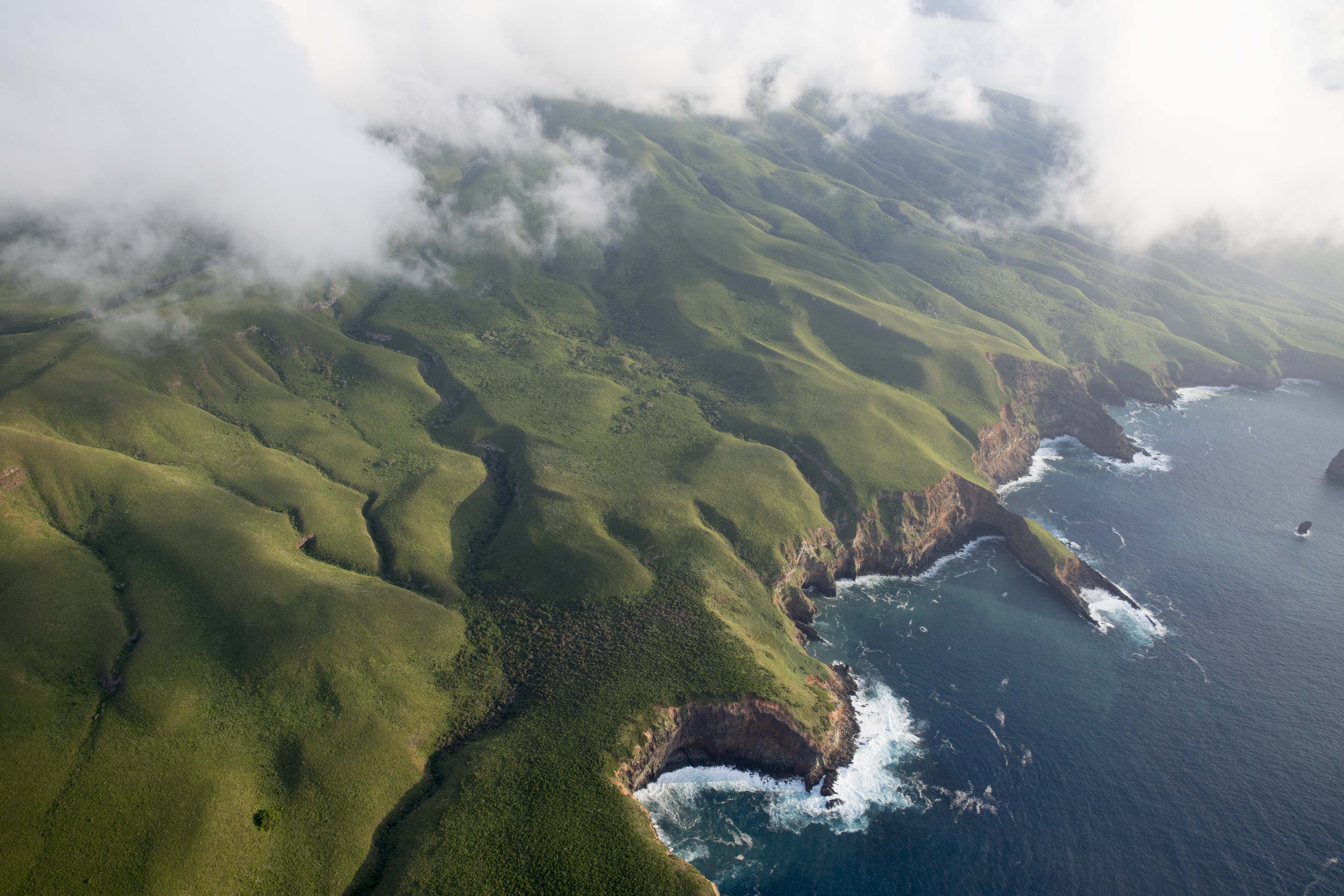
- Aerial view of Socorro Island, one of the Revillagigedo Islands
- Interactive map of Revillagigedo Islands

Geography
- Location: Pacific Ocean
- Coordinates: 18.7897°N 110.9760°W
- Total islands: 4
- Area: 157.81 km^{2} (60.93 sq mi)
- Highest elevation: 1,130 m (3710 ft)
- Highest point: Cerro Evermann
- State: Colima

Demographics
- Population: 54

Additional information
- Time zone: Mountain Time Zone (UTC−7); Pacific Time Zone (UTC−8)

UNESCO World Heritage Site
- Official name: Archipiélago de Revillagigedo
- Type: Natural
- Criteria: vii, ix, x
- Designated: 2016 (40th session)
- Reference no.: 1510
- Region: Latin America and the Caribbean

Ramsar Wetland
- Official name: Reserva de la Biosfera Archipiélago de Revillagigedo
- Designated: 2 February 2004
- Reference no.: 1357

The Revillagigedo Islands (Spanish: Islas Revillagigedo, IPA: [reˈβiʝa xiˈxeðo]) or Revillagigedo Archipelago are a group of four volcanic islands in the Pacific Ocean, known for their unique ecosystem. They lie approximately 458 kilometres (285 mi) from Socorro Island south and southwest of Cabo San Lucas, the southern tip of the Baja California Peninsula, and 698 to 1,092 kilometres (434 to 679 mi) west of Manzanillo. Historically linked to the Mexican state of Colima, to which they were granted in 1861 to establish a penal colony, the islands are under Mexican federal property and jurisdiction.

In July 2016, the Revillagigedo Archipelago was inscribed as a UNESCO World Heritage Site, and in November 2017 they were declared to be a marine reserve and a national park of Mexico. Some of the volcanoes are active, with the last eruption of Volcán Bárcena in 1953, and Socorro in 1993. Travelling to the islands from their nearest land point takes approximately 26 to 30 hours, as they are typically reached by sea; a small military airstrip exists on Socorro.

== Geography ==
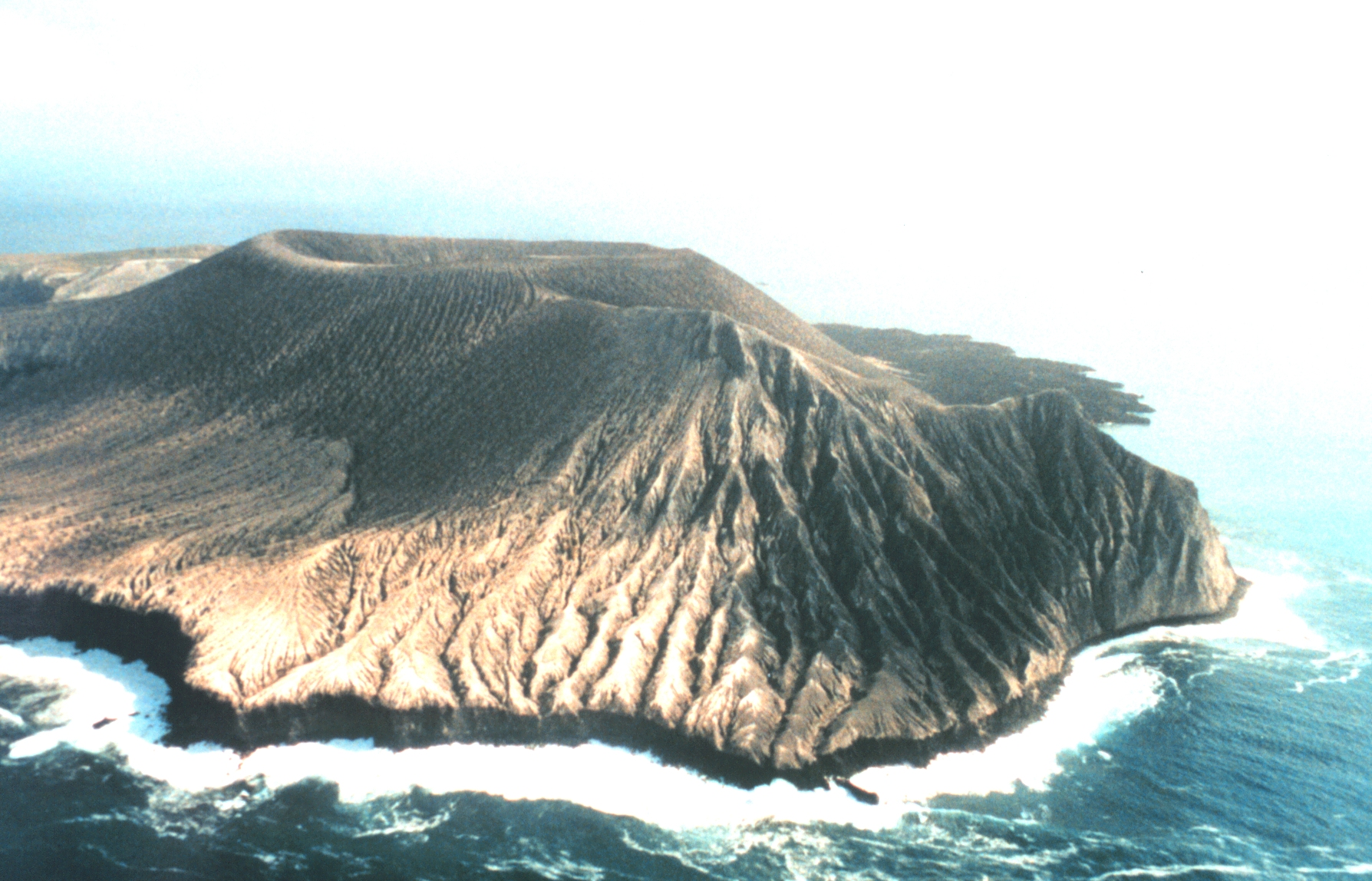
Montículo Cinerítico (front) and Bárcena (behind), volcanic cones on San Benedicto, one of the Revillagigedo Islands. Bárcena has existed only since 1952.

The total area is 157.81 km^{2} (60.93 mi^{2}), spread over an east-to-west extent of about 420 km (261 mi). A naval station in the south of Socorro Island has a population of 45 (staff). On Clarión is a small naval garrison with nine men. The islands are otherwise uninhabited. The islands are named after Don Juan Vicente de Güemes, 2nd Count of Revillagigedo, the 53rd viceroy of New Spain.

Island (alternate name)	Length by width (km)	Area (km^{2})	Highest peak (m)
Inner islands (UTC-7, Mountain Time Zone)
San Benedicto	4.315 by 2.490	5.94	Bárcena (310)
Socorro (San Tomás)	16.813 by 15.629	132.06	Mount (Cerro) Evermann (1130)
Roca Partida	0.246 by 0.073	0.014	(34)
Outer island (UTC-8, Pacific Time Zone)
Clarión (Santa Rosa)	8.544 by 3.686	19.80	Monte Gallegos (335)
Revillagigedo Islands	420 by 115	157.81	Mount (Cerro) Evermann (1130)

The three eastern islands are called the inner islands. They fall in the time zone UTC-7 (Mountain Time), while the major part of Colima is UTC-6 (Central Time Zone). Clarión is comparatively far to the west, by more than 200 km (100 miles) in comparison with the inner islands, and in UTC-8 (Pacific Time Zone). The Revillagigedo Islands are one of three Mexican island groups in the Pacific Ocean that are not on the continental shelf; the others are Guadalupe Island and Rocas Alijos.

== History ==
=== Sixteenth to nineteenth century ===
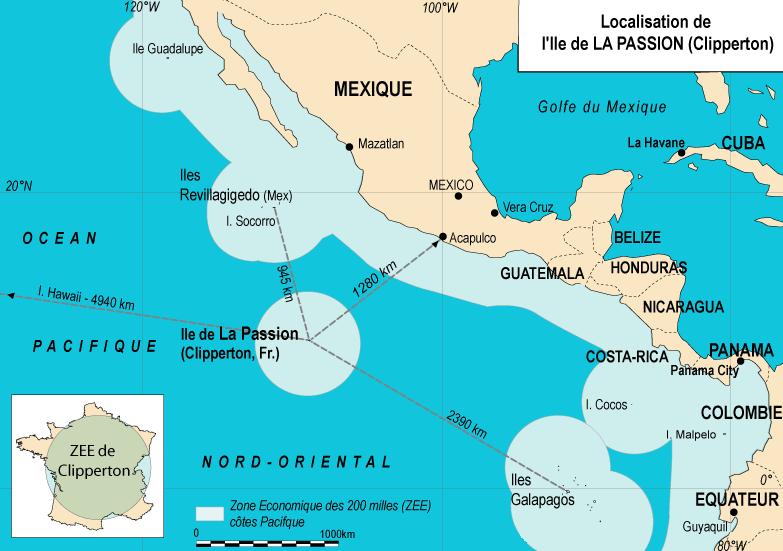
Location of Socorro Island and the rest of the Revillagigedo Archipelago, and extent of Mexico's western EEZ in the Pacific

No evidence of human habitation on any of the islands exists before their discovery by Spanish explorers. Hernando de Grijalva and his crew discovered an uninhabited island on 19 December 1533, and named it Santo Tomás (Socorro Island) and on 28 December they discovered Isla de los Inocentes (San Benedicto) which owed its name to having been found on the day of the Holy Innocents.

In November 1542, Ruy López de Villalobos, while exploring new routes across the Pacific, rediscovered Inocentes and Santo Tomás and charted the latter as Anublada ("Cloudy"). Villalobos was the first to report sighting of Roca Partida Island giving it its present-day name. In 1608, Martín Yánez de Armida, in charge of another expedition, visited Anublada and changed its name to Socorro. In 1779 José Camacho was the first to report sighting of the island remaining, that he charted as Santa Rosa ("Saint Rose"). Santa Rosa was later renamed Clarion after the vessel commanded by Henry Gyzelaar at that time.

The Revillagigedo Islands have been visited by a number of other explorers: Domingo del Castillo (1541), Miguel Pinto (1772), Alexander von Humboldt (1811), Benjamin Morrell (1825), Sir Edward Belcher (1839) who made the first botanical collections and Reeve, who witnessed the eruption of Mount Evermann in 1848. On 25 July 1861, President Benito Juárez signed a decree awarding territorial control over the four islands to the state of Colima. His plan was to build an offshore penitentiary on Isla Socorro; although this never happened, the decree whereby they were attached to Colima has never been repealed. In 1865, the island was explored by ornithologist Andrew Jackson Grayson, who discovered the Socorro dove, Socorro mockingbird and the Socorro elf owl which were later given scientific names in his honor.

=== Twentieth century ===
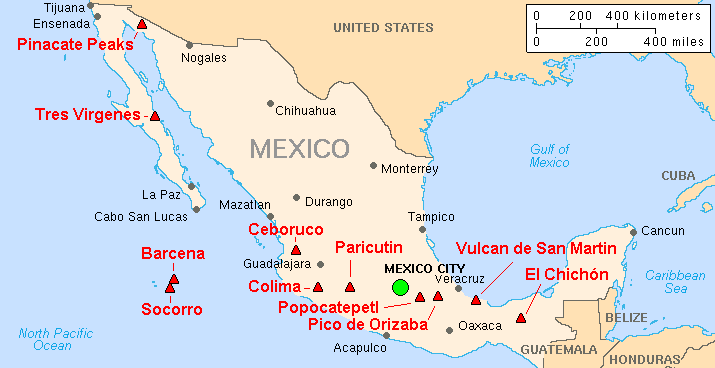
Socorro and Bárcena on San Benedicto are indicated on this map of Mexican volcanoes

At the beginning of the twentieth century, Dr. Barton Warren Evermann, director of the California Academy of Sciences in San Francisco, California, promoted the scientific exploration of the islands. The most comprehensive biological collections were obtained at this time. The volcano on Isla Socorro was renamed in his honor. In 1957 the Mexican Navy established a naval base on Socorro and has had a permanent presence on the island since then. A tiny outpost also exists on Clarión, as noted above. On 21 March 1972, Pablo Silva García became the first Governor of Colima to visit his state's island territories. A plaque was unveiled to mark the event and cement Colima's claim.

The seas surrounding the larger islands are popular with scuba divers; a variety of marine life such as cetaceans, sharks and manta rays can be observed. Visitors usually stay aboard expedition vessels during their visit to the islands, which is desirable from an ecological standpoint to prevent introduction of further invasive species. The islands are considered dangerous to visit for purposes beyond diving since it is difficult to make a landing; some have nearly lost their lives attempting to do so on Clarion for example.

They are occasionally visited by amateur radio operators, who usually use the ITU prefix XF4. Because of their distance from the mainland, for award credit they are considered to be an "entity" separate from Mexico. Expeditions from organizations engaged in biological conservation of the islands visit the islands for fieldwork on a regular basis. No tourism facilities exist; the islands have no reliable sources of fresh water of their own.

=== Twenty-first century ===
On 24 November 2017, President of Mexico Enrique Peña Nieto created North America's largest marine protected area around the Revillagigedo Islands. This protected area covers 150,000 square kilometres (57,000 mi^{2}) around the islands, and bans fishing, mining, and tourism development in the protected area and on the islands.

== Ecology ==
The Revillagigedo Islands are home to many endemic plant and animal species, and are sometimes called Mexico's "little Hawaii". They are recognized as a distinct terrestrial ecoregion, part of the Neotropical realm. Socorro is the most diverse in flora, fauna, and topography. The Mexican Government established the islands as a Biosphere Reserve on June 4, 1994. Oceanographic Magazine stated in 2020 that, "Its remoteness, protection and peculiar oceanography makes it one of the most biodiverse and exciting marine destinations on earth."

The islands are mostly covered with tropical dry forest, with several distinct plant communities that vary with elevation, soils, and exposure. Hopbush (Dodonaea viscosa) and Guettarda insularis are common dry forest species. Green buttonwood mangrove (Conocarpus erectus) and the shrub Hibiscus tiliaceus pernambucensis grow along the seacoast.

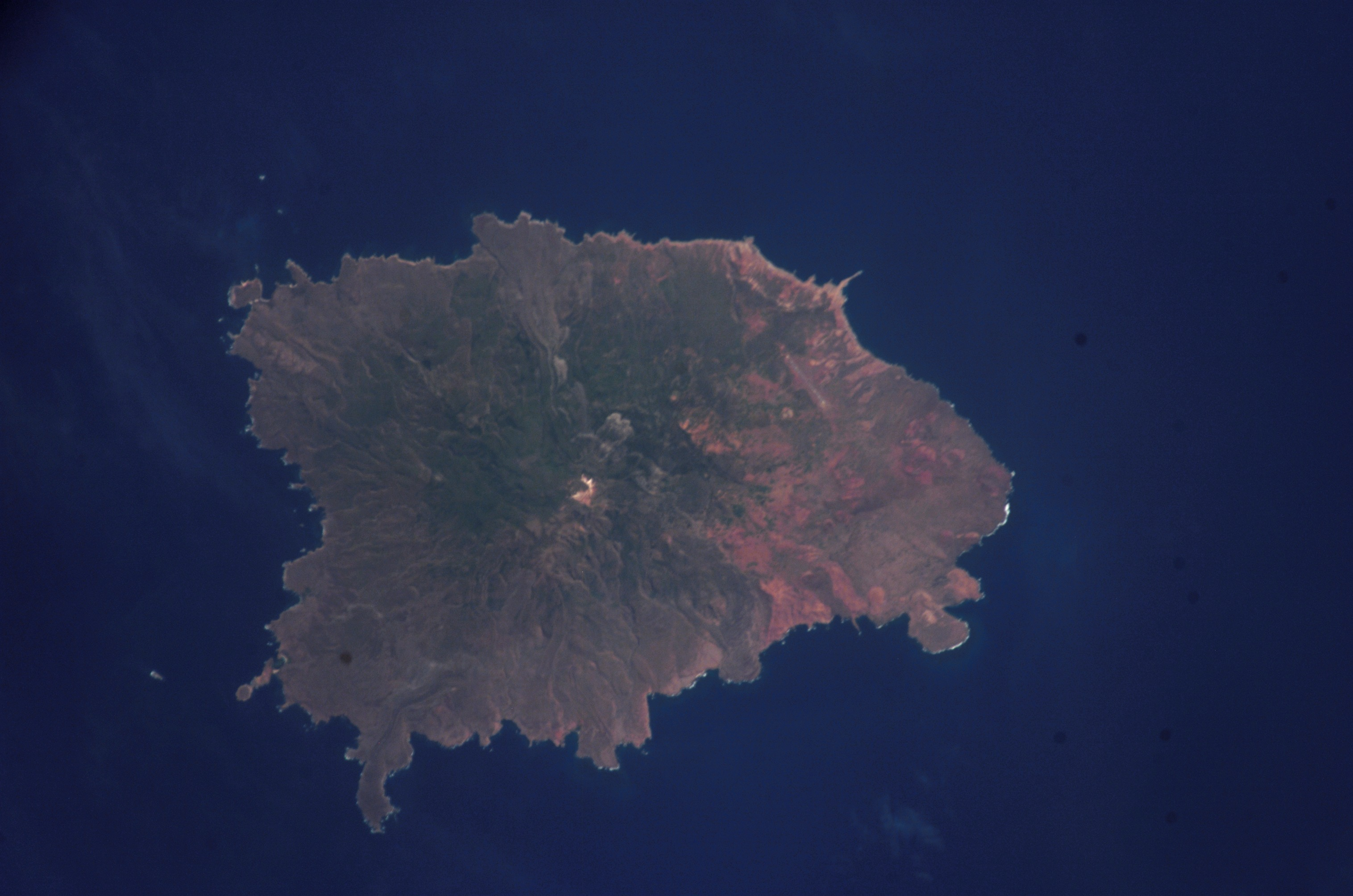
Socorro as seen from space. North is to the upper left corner.

According to the World Wide Fund for Nature (WWF), 14 of the islands' 16 generally accepted resident taxa of landbirds are endemic, and include the Clarión wren (Troglodytes tanneri), Socorro wren (Troglodytes sissonii), Socorro mockingbird (Mimus graysoni), Socorro dove (Zenaida graysoni), and Socorro parakeet (Arahuga brevipes). Clarión is home to endemic subspecies of burrowing owl (Athene cunicularia rostrata), mourning dove (Zenaida macroura clarionensis), and common raven (Corvus corax clarionensis). A variety of yellow-crowned night heron, Nyctanassa violacea bancrofti (gravirostris), is endemic to Socorro. Townsend's shearwater (Puffinus auricularis) is a seabird that breeds only around Cerro Evermann on Socorro. It formerly bred on Clarión and San Benedicto, but has not bred on Clarión since 1988 nor on San Benedicto since 1952.

The islands' four native terrestrial vertebrates are all endemic, and include a whip snake (Masticophis anthonyi), a night snake (Hypsiglena unaocularis) and two iguanids (Urosaurus auriculatus and U. clarionensis). Numerous seabird taxa breed no further north(east)wards than San Benedicto; storm-petrels are notably absent as breeders though they breed in the region and visit the islands to forage. Albatrosses are also not normally found here. Among landbirds, the absence of the house finch, widespread on northeastern Pacific offshore islands, is the most conspicuous one.

Apart from the native birds, migrant shorebirds and others are often found on the islands. Bahia Azufre (Sulfur Bay) on Clarión seems to be a favorite stopover location, as it is one of the few longer stretches of beach in the islands; mostly, the shoreline is steep cliffs. The archipelago is also a part of wintering grounds for humpback whales in the North Pacific.

Socorro has numerous endemic plant taxa, whereas Clarión has only a few. The San Benedicto ecosystem was nearly wiped out in the devastating eruption of Bárcena volcano on August 1, 1952. The ecosystem there has since recovered, but the event is known to have caused the extinction of the San Benedicto rock wren. Most if not all native plants found on San Benedicto today are shared with Clarión, but not with the closer Socorro to the south, due to the prevailing winds and ocean currents. The native flora of Clarión is about equally shared with both other large islands.

As opposed to the interchange between the islands, the animals and plants that colonized them initially are apparently all from mainland populations generally to the northeastward of the Revillagigedos. Plants are most often derived from Baja California founder populations, whereas the endemic nonavian reptiles seem to be rather derived directly from mainland populations of the Sonora-Sinaloa area. The ancestors of the islands' terrestrial birds probably came from the general area of southern North and northern Central America. As illustrated by the fact that no endemic landbird taxon occurs on more than one island and the cases of the Socorro and Clarión wrens as well as the Socorro dove and Clarión mourning dove, each bird population seems to have arisen independently. The archipelago has been recognised as an Important Bird Area (IBA) by BirdLife International for its breeding seabirds and endemic landbirds.

Ilex socorroensis, Aristolochia socorroensis, Bidens socorrensis, Coreocarpus insularis, Eremosis littoralis, Erigeron socorrensis, Perityle socorrosensis, Zapoteca formosa subsp. socorrensis, Lepechinia hastata subsp. socorrensis, Salvia pseudomisella, Triumfetta socorrensis, Botrychium socorrense, Acianthera unguicallosa, Castilleja bryantii var. socorrensis, Peperomia socorronis, Muhlenbergia solisii, Paspalum longum, Guettarda insularis, Meliosma nesites, Cestrum pacificum, Physalis mimulus, Citharexylum danirae, and Verbena sphaerocarpa are endemic to Socorro. Portulaca masonii is endemic to Clarión. Aristolochia islandica and Erigeron crenatus are endemic to San Benedicto. Plants endemic to two or more islands include Cryptantha foliosa, Bulbostylis nesiotica, Cyperus duripes, Croton masonii, Teucrium townsendii, Oenothera resicum, Aristida tenuifolia, Aristida vaginata, Spermacoce nesiotica, and Nicotiana stocktonii.

=== Threats and conservation ===
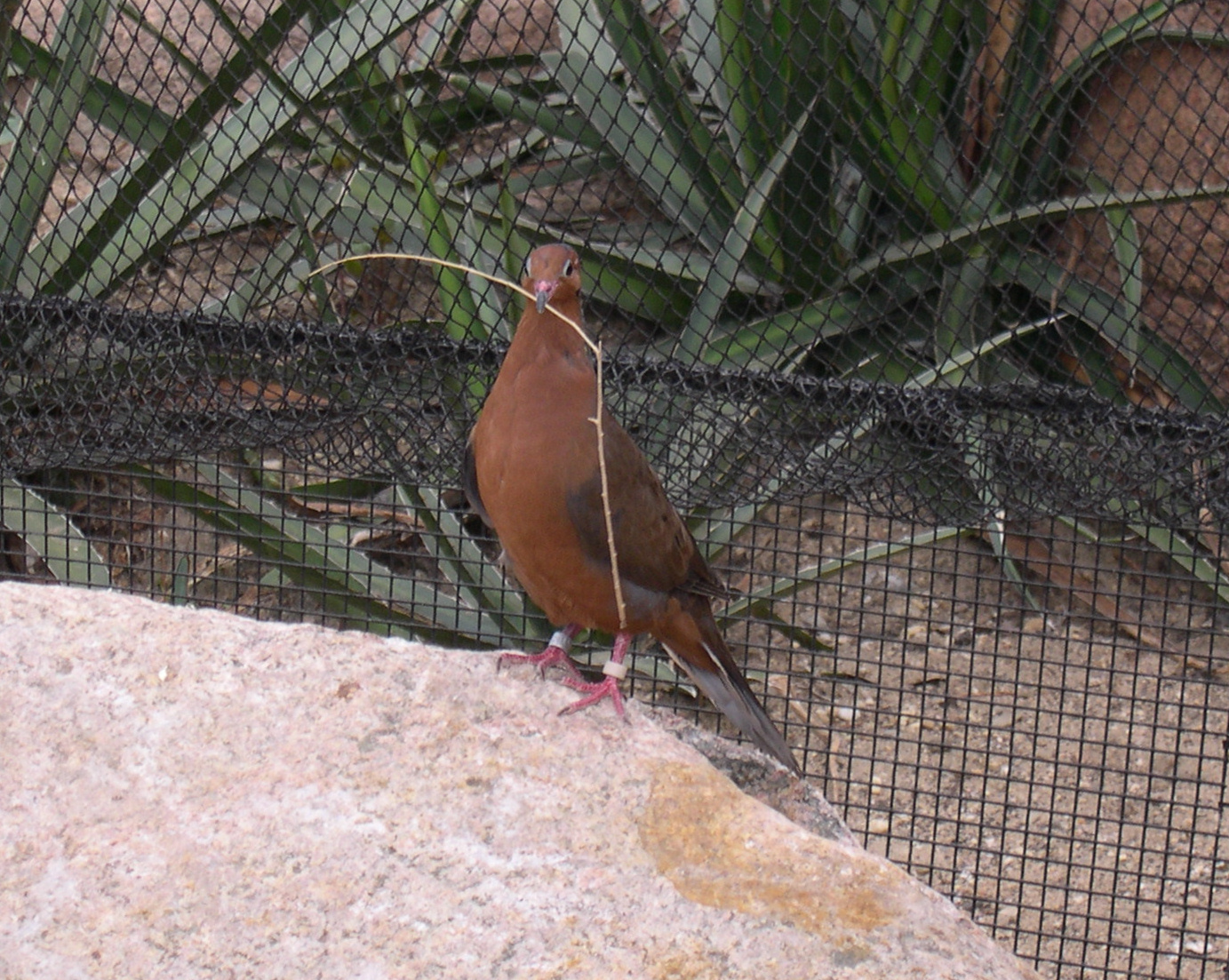
The Socorro dove (Zenaida graysoni), as of 2019, survives only in captivity

As late as 1956, it was said that:

"The future of the avifauna of the islands appears to be secure at present. There are no human inhabitants, and no mammals of any kind except the moderate and apparently stable population of sheep on Socorro."

But the unique ecology of the islands has since then come under threat from introduced species. The sheep were introduced to Socorro in 1869. Cats became established after 1953, probably in the early 1970s. Pigs were introduced to Clarión in 1979, and rabbits became feral at some earlier date.

Several endemic species of Socorro are now threatened with extinction. The Socorro mockingbird (Mimodes graysoni) numbers fewer than 400 individuals altogether. The endemic Socorro parakeet (Psittacara brevipes) and Townsend's shearwater (Puffinus auricularis), are also endangered. The Socorro dove (Zenaida graysoni) is now extinct in the wild, but is being bred in captivity. The elf owl's Socorro subspecies Micrathene whitneyi graysoni appears to be extinct. Other plant and animal taxa in the archipelago are also considered threatened or nearly so.

A number of conservation initiatives are dedicated to halting the destruction of the native ecosystems of the islands. Dr. Harmunt Walter of the University of California, Los Angeles (UCLA) and Dr. Luis F. Baptista of the California Academy of Sciences have coordinated breeding and reintroduction efforts for the Socorro dove since 1988, through the Island Endemics Institute. The Comité Científico para la Conservación y Restauración del Archipiélago Revillagigedo ("Scientific Committee for the Conservation and Restoration of the Revillagigedo Islands") was founded in 1996, and is a committee representing several organizations, including the Island Conservation & Ecology Group, Island Endemics Institute, the University of Missouri–St. Louis (UMSL), the National Autonomous University of Mexico (UNAM) and others. It is chaired by Dr. Walter and Dr. Luis Medrano of UNAM is its secretary. The committee has been advocating removal of the exotic species from the islands, especially the estimated 2000 sheep on Socorro, to allow the islands' ecology to recover, and adoption of a management plan to promote the recovery of the islands' native species, including reintroduction of the Socorro dove.

Brattstrom and Howell who gave the optimistic outlook in 1956 went on to caution:

"it may be hoped that the Mexican government will guard against the introduction of mammals such as rabbits, cats, goats and others that have invariably brought disaster to the flora and fauna of insular regions."

=== Marine protected area ===
On 25 November 2017, President of Mexico Enrique Peña Nieto acted to protect the biodiversity of the region by creating North America's largest marine protected area around the islands, and prohibiting mining, fishing, and tourism development on or near the islands. In total, marine protected areas cover 4.6% of Mexico's exclusive economic zone for fishing. Marine protected areas have been shown to positively contribute to ocean diversity, improve nearby fishing locations, and combat climate change. A study published five years after the establishment of the marine protected area found that fishing activity within the protected zone had decreased by an average of 82% per vessel. The study also found that industrial fishing catches in Mexico's exclusive economic zone had not decreased.
