= Hernando de Grijalva =

Spanish explorer

Hernando de Grijalva, who died in 1537 in the course of a crossing of the Pacific Ocean, was a Spanish navigator and explorer in the service of Hernán Cortés. He is known mainly for the discovery of the archipelago of Revillagigedo (1534) and the first crossing from Peru to New Guinea, being killed by mutineers en route.

This last voyage is known from the account of António Galvão (-1537) , who received the testimony of the surviving mariners, and of Diogo do Couto (1542-1616).

== Biography ==
=== Family origins ===
He may be related to Juan de Grijalva, who explored the coasts of Mexico from Yucatán to the island of San Juan de Ulúa in 1518.

=== Beginnings in the New World ===
In 1518, he was in Cuba, which had been conquered in 1511, at the time when Hernan Cortés was preparing his expedition to Mexico.

In August 1521, Cortés seized the capital of the Aztec Empire, Tenochtitlan, and founded the colony of New Spain, of which he was captain general, recognized by Charles V from 1522. Grijalva remained in Cortés' service.

After expeditions to Honduras (1524-1526) and a stay in Spain (1529-1530), the latter organized expeditions to "California", a country still unexplored at that time.

=== Expeditions to California (1533-1535) ===
The first expedition took place in 1532, under the command of Diego Hurtado de Mendoza. When she did not return (she had disappeared under unknown circumstances), Cortés sent a relief expedition commanded by Diego de Becerra.

In this expedition, Grijalva was captain of the "San Lazaro", the second ship of the squadron. The two ships, which left Manzanillo during the autumn of 1533, were separated in December.

Grijalva, sailing out to sea, discovered the Revillagigedo Islands, then returned to the port of departure in February 1534 (the other ship experienced the mutiny of the pilot Fortún Ximénez and reached Baja California).

In 1535, Grijalva participated in the third expedition, led by Cortés himself. But the "San Lazaro" having run aground, Grijalva was forced to wait for Cortés' return to return to New Spain (April 1536).

At this time, New Spain was under the leadership of the first viceroy, Antonio de Mendoza, who arrived in Mexico City in November 1535. Cortés remained captain general, however, but subordinate to the viceroy.

=== Trans-Pacific expedition (1537) ===
A courier arrived at this time from Peru, where Francisco Pizarro, besieged by the Indians of Manco Capac II in Lima, asked for help. Cortés decided to launch a rescue expedition without delay, with two ships, the carrack Santiago, commanded by Grijalva, and the patache Trinidad (Fernando de Alvarado). But he also asks Grijalva to continue his explorations of the "South Sea" after completing his mission.

Grijalva left the port of Paita in April 1537. They first travelled southwest to latitude 29° South, then up to 25° North. They were then prevented by the winds from heading towards New Spain and returned to the equator. It was then that the crew asked him to head west to reach the "Spice Islands" (the Moluccas). Grijalva refused, not wanting to go to areas allocated to Portugal by the Treaty of Tordesillas. He was assassinated by mutinous sailors.

The crew, continuing along the equator, discovered two islands: Acea (present-day Christmas Island in Kiribati) and Fisherman's Island (present-day Nonouti).

Most of the mutineers died during the journey. The ship eventually ran aground on the northern coast of New Guinea where three survivors were captured by the Papuans and sold to the Malays, according to Galvão.

In 1539, the Portuguese Antonio Galvao was informed of this affair and contacted the survivors.

== Sources ==
- António Galvão, Tratado dos descobrimentos, Lisbonne, 1563
- Diogo do Couto, Decadas, Lisbonne, after 1600

== Bibliography ==
- Jean Amsler, La Renaissance (1415-1600), book II of Histoire Universelle des Explorations published under the direction of L.-H. Parias, Paris, Nouvelle Librairie de France, 1957, p. 325
- Henry Evans Maude, On Islands and Men, Melbourne, 1968.
