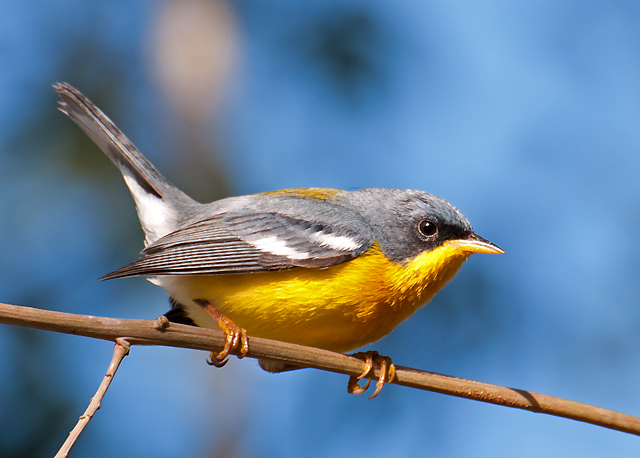
- In Brazil

Conservation status
- Least Concern (IUCN 3.1)

- Near Threatened (IUCN 3.1)

Scientific classification
- Kingdom: Animalia
- Phylum: Chordata
- Class: Aves
- Order: Passeriformes
- Family: Parulidae
- Genus: Setophaga
- Species: S. pitiayumi

Binomial name
- Setophaga pitiayumi (Vieillot, 1817)
- Range of S. pitiayumi Breeding range Year-round range

Synonyms
- See text

= Tropical parula =

Species of bird

The tropical parula (Setophaga pitiayumi) is a species of passerine bird in the family Parulidae, the New World warblers. It is found in the U. S. state of Texas, Mexico, and every Central American country. Its range continues in every mainland South American country (though in Chile only as a vagrant), on Trinidad, and as a vagrant on the Falkland Islands.

== Taxonomy and systematics ==
The tropical parula was formally described in 1817 as Sylvia pitiayumi. It was sequentially placed in genera Parula and Dendroica. Beginning in 2011 taxonomic systems merged both of those genera into its present genus Setophaga. In the twentieth century some authors proposed that the tropical parula and the northern parula (Setophaga americana) should be lumped as a single species. They do form a superspecies. The tropical parula has also borne the English names Sennett's warbler, olive-backed warbler, Pitiaymi warbler, and tropical parula warbler.

The tropical parula's further taxonomy is unsettled. The IOC, AviList, the Clements taxonomy, and the American Ornithological Society assign it these nine subspecies:

- S. p. nigrilora (Coues, 1878)
- S. p. pulchra (Brewster, 1889)
- S. p. insularis (Lawrence, 1871)
- S. p. graysoni (Ridgway, 1887)
- S. p. inornata (Baird, SF, 1864)
- S. p. cirrha (Wetmore, 1957)
- S. p. pacifica (Berlepsch & Taczanowski, 1884)
- S. p. alarum (Chapman, 1924)
- S. p. pitiayumi (Vieillot, 1817)

However, since 2016 BirdLife International's Handbook of the Birds of the World has treated S. p. graysoni as a full species, the Socorro warbler.

This article follows the majority nine-subspecies model.

== Description ==
The tropical parula is about 11 cm (4.3 in) long and weighs 6.5 to 8.0 g (0.23 to 0.28 oz). Adult males of subspecies S. p. nigrilora have a mostly blue-gray head with black lores and a small black mask. Their upperparts are also mostly blue-gray with an olive mantle. Their wings are blue-gray with white tips on the greater and median coverts that show as two wing bars. Their tail is blue-gray with large white spots near the ends of the feathers. Their throat and underparts to the belly are yellow with a strong orange wash on the lower throat, upper breast, and flanks. Their belly and undertail coverts are white. Adult females are similar to males but overall duller. They lack the black mask and have little or no orange on the underparts. Immature birds resemble adult females but with more greenish upperparts, duller underparts, and faint or no wing bars.

Males of the other subspecies of the tropical parula differ from S. p. nigrilora and each other thus:

- S. p. pulchra: somewhat larger; wider wing bars and rusty to pale chestnut flanks
- S. p. insularis: largest subspecies; grayish lores, wider wing bars, rusty to pale chestnut flanks, and smaller tail spots
- S. p. graysoni: grayer overall, paler yellow breast and flanks with little to no orange, and white of tail only on edge of inner webs
- S. p. inornata: deeper blue head and back, smaller olive mantle patch, no wing bars or one small one, and yellow belly
- S. p. cirrha: deeper blue head and back, larger mask, and more orangey belly
- S. p. pacifica: indigo blue head and back and yellow belly
- S. p. alarum: indigo blue head and back, yellow belly, and one wing bar
- S. p. pitiayumi: variable head and back from deep blue to gray-blue, yellower (less orange) belly

Like females of S. p. nigrilora, females of the other subspecies are duller and have less orange than males. Both sexes of all subspecies have a dark brown iris, a black or brownish maxilla, a yellow mandible, and light pinkish brown legs and feet.

There are multiple eBird records of northern X tropical parula hybrids in Texas, most of which are later than 2010. A partially leucistic tropical parula female was seen in 2005 at Reserva Buenaventura in El Oro Province, Ecuador.

== Distribution and habitat ==
The tropical parula is found in almost every mainland country of the Americas and on several islands as well. It is essentially absent from the Amazon Basin. The subspecies are found thus:

- S. p. nigrilora: from the Edwards Plateau and upper Gulf of Mexico coast of Texas south along Mexico's Sierra Madre Oriental to eastern San Luis Potosí and northern Veracruz
- S. p. pulchra: Mexico's Sierra Madre Occidental from Chihuahua and southern Sonora south to Oaxaca
- S. p. insularis: Tres Marías Islands off western Mexico's Nayarit
- S. p. graysoni: Socorro and Revillagigedo Islands off western Mexico
- S. p. inornata: from southern Mexico's southern Veracruz and Chiapas south intermittently through Guatemala and much of Honduras. It occurs in Belize and El Salvador as a vagrant. From Honduras its range continues through Nicaragua and the Caribbean and Pacific slopes of Costa Rica into western Panama. It also occurs from Darién Province in eastern Panama into northwestern Colombia.
- S. p. cirrha: Coiba Island off the Pacific coast of Panama
- S. p. pacifica: Pacific slope of the Andes from Nariño Department in southwestern Colombia south through Ecuador into northwestern Peru to Cajamarca Department; also through central Peru from Junín Department and into western Bolivia's La Paz and Cochabamba departments
- S. p. alarum: eastern Andean slope of Ecuador into northern Peru's Marañón River valley
- S. p. pitiayumi: Colombia's Andes and east into northwestern Venezuela including Margarita Island; Trinidad; from northern and eastern Venezuela into extreme northern Brazil and across the southern Guianas; from central and eastern Bolivia across Brazil to the Atlantic in Rio Grande do Norte and south from that line through southern Brazil, Paraguay, Uruguay, and Argentina to northern San Luis, central Santa Fe, and eastern Buenos Aires provinces

The tropical parula has been documented as a vagrant in the U.S. as far north as the Colorado, west to California, and east to Louisiana. It has also been documented as a vagrant in Chile and in the Falkland Islands.

The tropical parula inhabits a variety of semi-arid to humid landscapes, most of which are forested and somewhat open. These include woodlands, the edges and clearings of denser forest, gallery forest, and secondary forest. It less often occurs in scrublands and generally shuns very humid lowland tropical evergreen forest. In western Mexico it also inhabits thorn forest and mangroves. In Texas it almost always is found in taller woodland heavy with epiphytes like Tillandsia "mosses". In Mexico and Central America it mostly ranges between 2,000 and 2,500 m (6,600 and 8,200 ft) but is fairly common as low as 250 m (800 ft). South of Mexico through Honduras and in Costa Rica it is found below 1,800 m (5,900 ft). It reaches 2,600 m (8,500 ft) in Colombia and 2,500 m (8,200 ft) in Brazil. In western Ecuador it is found from near sea level to 2,000 m (6,600 ft) and east of the Andes mostly between 900 and 1,800 m (3,000 and 5,900 ft). In Peru's northwest and Marañón valley it is found between 200 and 2,400 m (700 and 7,900 ft) and on the eastern Andean slope between 700 and 1,900 m (2,300 and 6,200 ft). In Venezuela it reaches 2,500 m (8,200 ft) north of the Orinoco River and 2,000 m (6,600 ft) south of it.

== Behavior ==
=== Movement ===
The tropical parula is a year-round resident in most of its range. Most that breed in Texas and far northern Mexico move south, though their wintering range is not known. Some remain year-round in those areas.

=== Feeding ===
The tropical parula feeds mostly on larval and adult insects. It also feeds on other arthropods, berries, and the sweet excretions of plant lice. It takes most prey by gleaning from foliage but has been observed taking winged termites in mid-air. In much of its range during the breeding season it forages mostly in the forest sub-canopy and canopy. In the non-breeding season it often forages in the understory, "possibly because of interactions with Neotropical migrants". It typically forages singly or in pairs during the breeding season. In the non-breeding season it often joins mixed-species feeding flocks.

=== Breeding ===
The tropical parula's breeding seasons vary geographically but are unknown in detail in much of its range. From Panama north it is generally from late April to about mid-July but in some areas may begin in March. In Trinidad it spans at least June to August. South of the equator its season appears to be concentrated between at least October and January but in some areas active nests have been found in all months. Most known nests were domes hollowed out in epiphytes and lined with fine plant fibers and hair. A few open cups have been found. Nests have been found between 2 and 13 m (7 and 43 ft) above the ground. Eight clutches averaged about three eggs with two to five known. The eggs are white with dark speckles and spots. The female along broods and both parents provision nestlings. The incubation period, time to fledging, and other details of parental care are not known.

=== Vocalization ===
Male tropical parulas sing; apparently females do not. In the northern subspecies they have two general song types, a "repeated series of relatively simple syllables, increasing in tempo and pitch, forming rising trill that usually ends with buzzy downslur" and "several simple and complex syllables arranged according to no readily discernible syntax". Further south "songs have less buzzy quality and are more complex...a rapid flow of small bright notes which often run into a fine, high-pitched trill". An example of this last has been written "tzip-tzip-tzip-tzip-tzrrrrrrrip". Both sexes give sharp high calls "variously described as pit, sip, chik, or tip".

== Status ==
The IUCN follows HBW taxonomy and so has separately assessed the "Socorro parula" from the rest of the tropical parula. It is judged to be Near Threatened. It has a very small range; its population size and trend are not known. The primary threat is predation by feral cats and rats. However, one survey found them to be fairly common on Revillagigedo Island. The IUCN has assessed S. pitiayumi (less S. p. graysoni) as being of Least Concern. It has an extremely large range; its estimated population of at least 20 million mature individuals is believed to be decreasing. No immediate threats have been identified. The species is considered rare in Texas. It is "frequent to uncommon" overall in Mexico and Central America, "uncommon" in northern Central America, "fairly common" on the Caribbean side of Costa Rica, and "fairly uncommon" on the Pacific side. It is common in Colombia and Ecuador, fairly common in Peru, "fairly common to locally common" in Venezuela, and "frequent to uncommon" in Brazil.

== Gallery ==
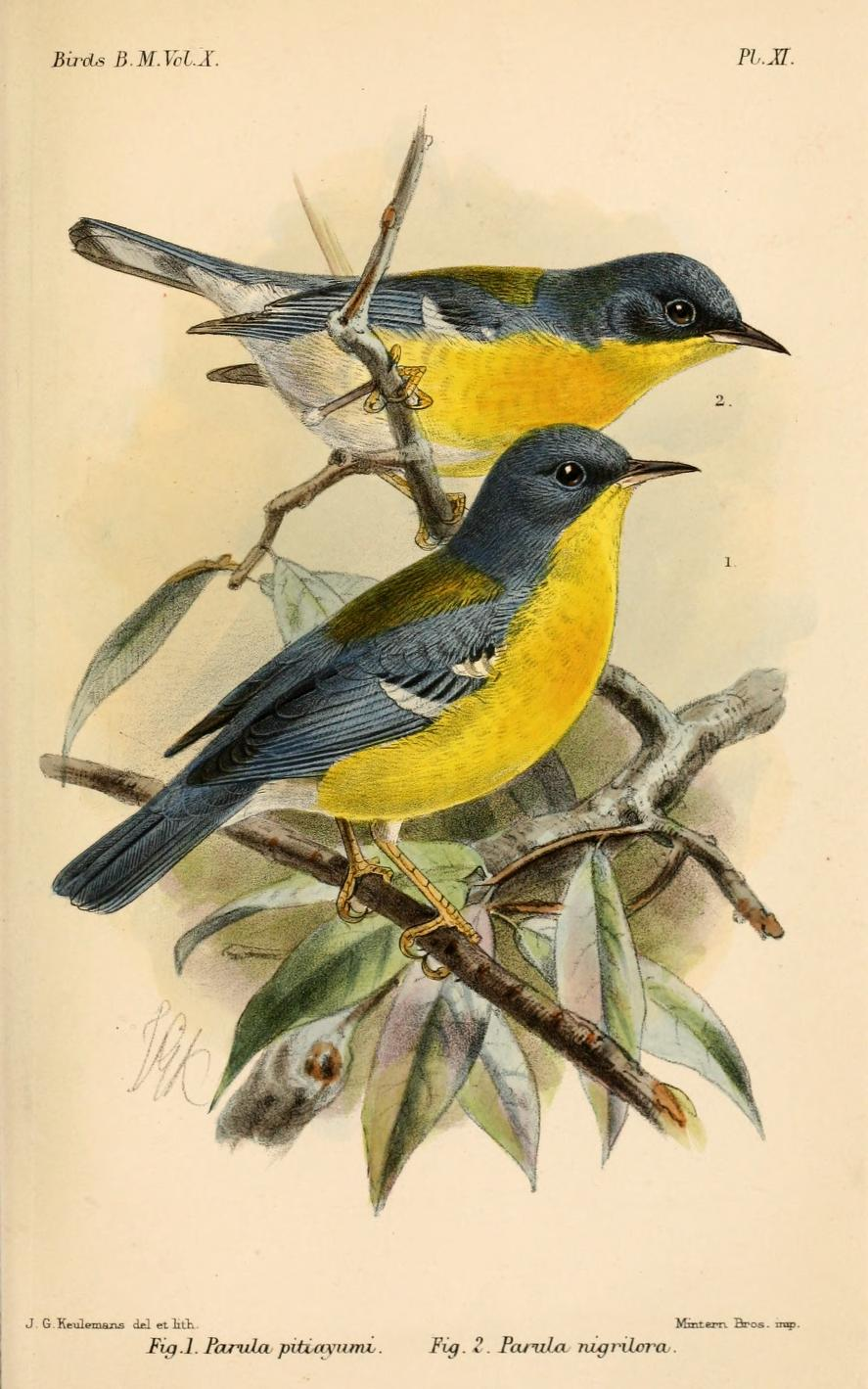
Illustration by John Gerrard Keulemans, 1885

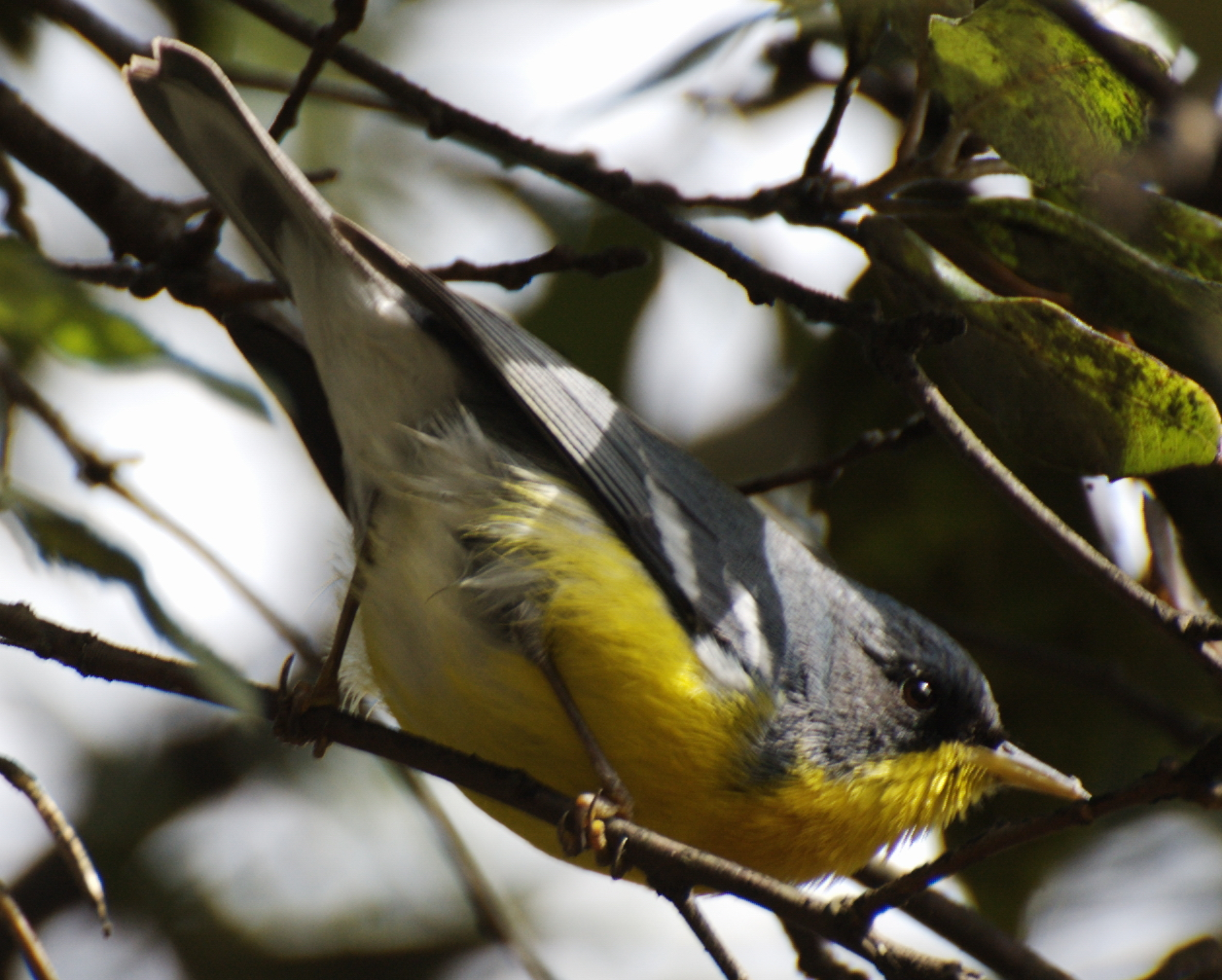
Adult male in Uruguay
