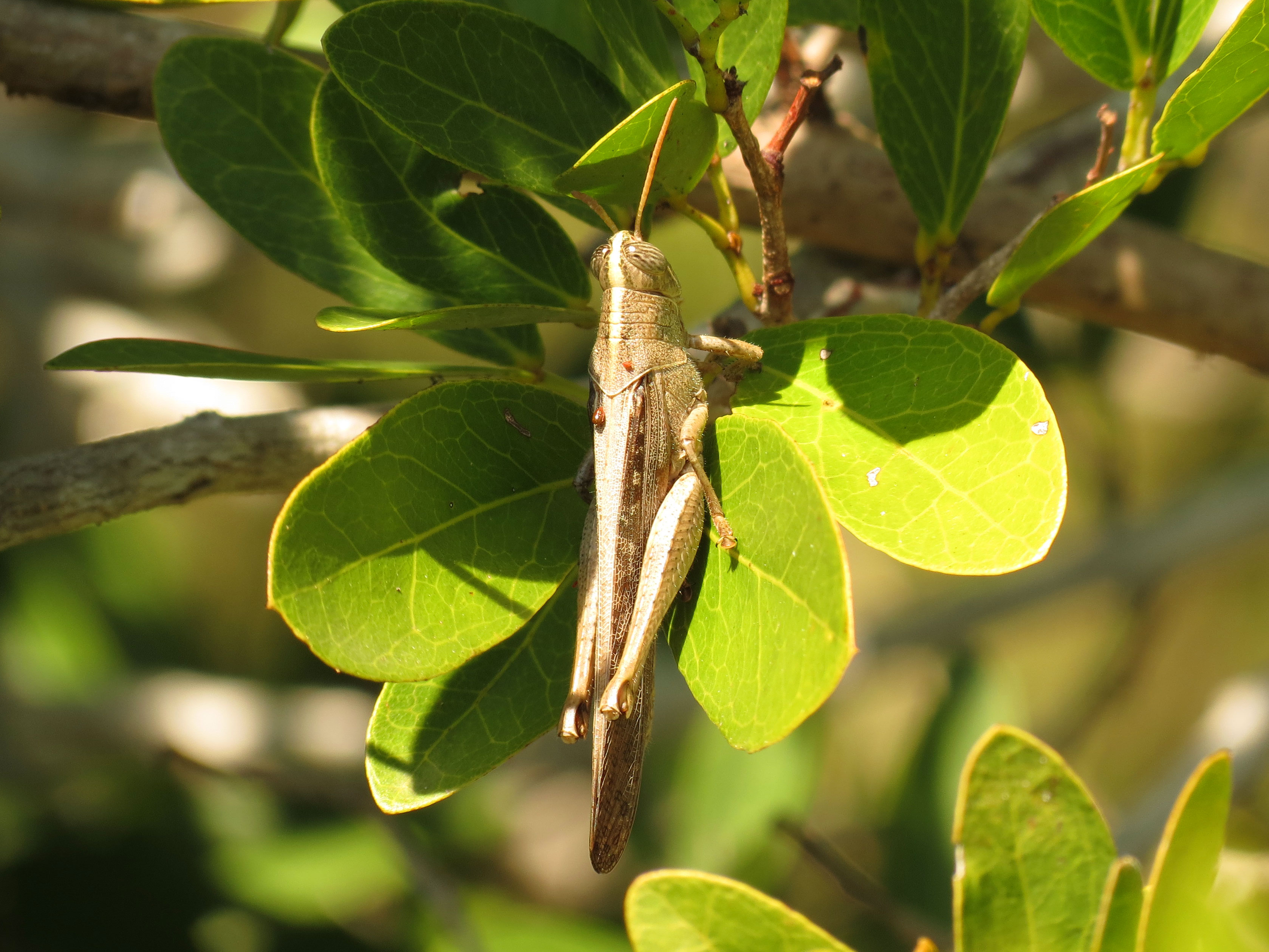
- S. p. piceifrons

Scientific classification
- Kingdom: Animalia
- Phylum: Arthropoda
- Clade: Pancrustacea
- Class: Insecta
- Order: Orthoptera
- Suborder: Caelifera
- Family: Acrididae
- Subfamily: Cyrtacanthacridinae
- Tribe: Cyrtacanthacridini
- Genus: Schistocerca
- Species: S. piceifrons

Binomial name
- Schistocerca piceifrons (Walker F, 1870)

= Schistocerca piceifrons =

Species of grasshopper

Schistocerca piceifrons is a large locust in the subfamily Cyrtacanthacridinae: Acrididae. There are two subspecies. S. p. piceifrons is sometimes called the Central American locust and S. p. peruviana is sometimes known as the Peruvian locust.

== Taxonomy and distribution ==
S. piceifrons is closely related to Schistocerca americana, but exhibits a greater degree of phase polymorphism referred to in the technical literature as "density-dependent phenotypic plasticity. It is the swarming locust of tropical America.

=== Subspecies ===
Two subspecies of S. piceifrons are recognised:

- S. p. piceifrons, which occurs in the dry areas of the Pacific coast of Central America and the Yucatan Peninsula of Mexico;
- S. p. peruviana, which occurs in the high valleys of the Andes.

Historically, swarms have invaded north through Colombia and Venezuela as far as Guyana. This species shows typical locust phase polymorphism. Solitarious nymphs are green, but gregarious ones are pink with a black pattern. There are morphological differences between solitarious and gregarious adults. For many years the two phases were believed to be different species; the gregarious form was mistakenly identified as S. paranensis and the solitarious form as S. americana.

== Life cycle and pest status ==
The species is polyphagous, but shows a preference for rice, wheat, maize, palms and citrus. It also attacks sunflower, lentil, potato, tobacco and sorghum when preferred plants are unavailable.

The life cycle of S. p. piceifrons in Yucatan and Central America is as follows. It survives the winter dry season in the adult stage. Copulation and oviposition occur in April with a new generation of adults appearing in July. These mature in September and lay a second generation of eggs which hatch in October. This generation becomes adult in late December to early January and remains immature until the following April.

The life cycle of S. p. peruviana is less well understood owing to the complicating effect of altitude. However, it is also believed to have two generations per year, although this is not certain, surviving the dry season from May to October in the adult stage.

The most serious recorded plague of S. p. piceifrons in Central America occurred in 1939 and lasted until 1954. Regarding S. p. peruviana, the area around Ayacucho has been permanently infested since 1940. From 1945 to 1948 northern Peru was infested by a plague that covered 100,000 square kilometres. Colombia has recorded 12 locust plagues between 1540 and 1917. Swarms, probably originating in Colombia, reached Venezuela, Trinidad and Guyana in two plagues: 1881–1886 and 1913–18, although the subspecies of these last cannot be determined with certainty.
