= Croton masonii =

Scientific classification
- Kingdom: Plantae
- Clade: Tracheophytes
- Clade: Angiosperms
- Clade: Eudicots
- Clade: Rosids
- Order: Malpighiales
- Family: Euphorbiaceae
- Genus: Croton
- Species: C. masonii

Binomial name
- Croton masonii I.M.Johnst. (1931)

Species of flowering plant

Croton masonii is a species of flowering plant in the spurge family, Euphorbiaceae. It is a shrub endemic to the Revillagigedo Islands, an archipelago off Mexico's Pacific coast.
