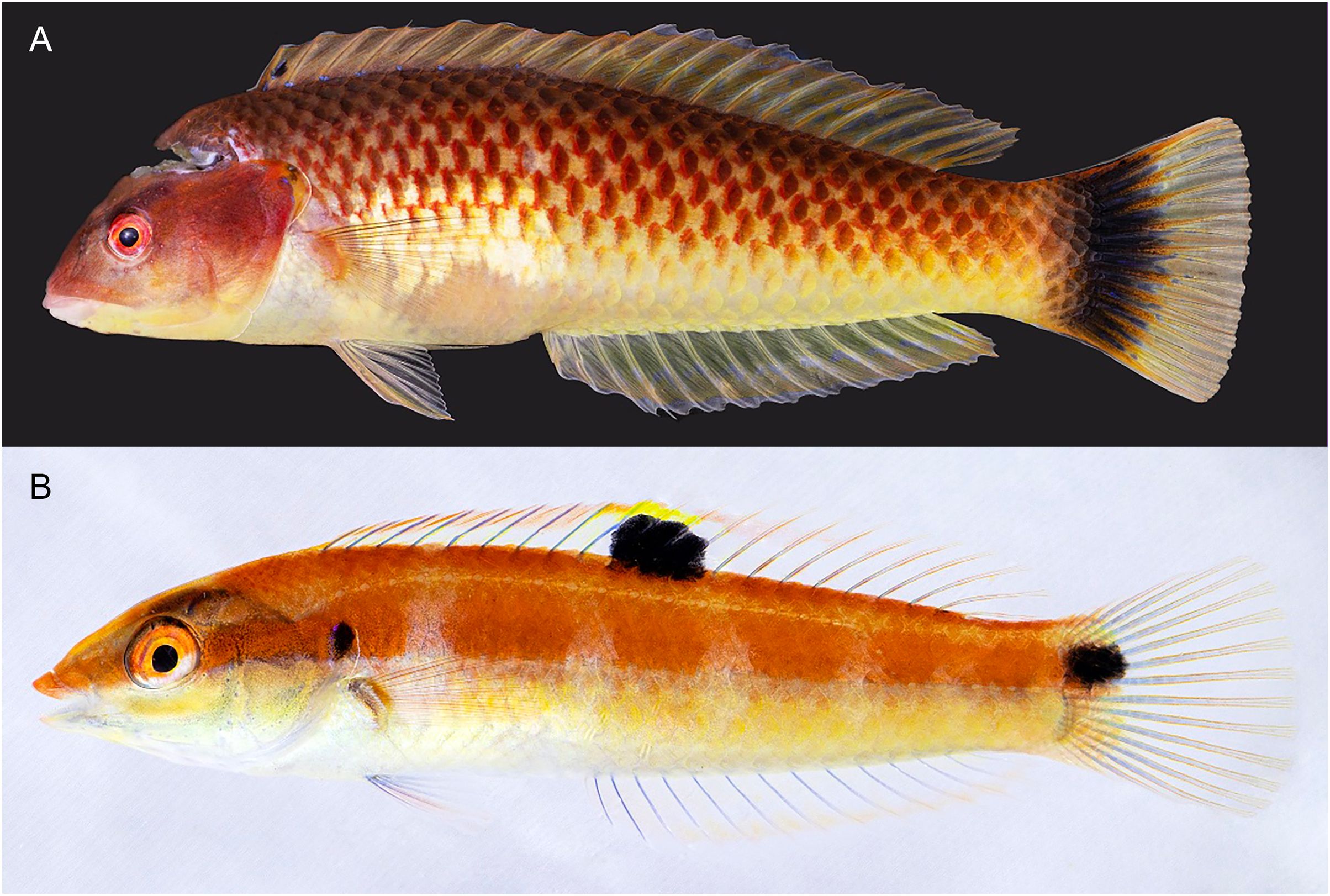
- Terminal phase (A) and initial phase (B)

Scientific classification
- Kingdom: Animalia
- Phylum: Chordata
- Class: Actinopterygii
- Order: Labriformes
- Family: Labridae
- Genus: Halichoeres
- Species: H. sanchezi

Binomial name
- Halichoeres sanchezi Victor, Frable & Ludt, 2024

= Halichoeres sanchezi =

Species of fish

Halichoeres sanchezi, known by its common name, the tailspot wrasse, is a wrasse in the family Labridae. Halichoeres is a wide-ranging genus; the name comes from the Greek words for salt, alis, and pig, choiros, which likely refers to their blunt snouts. The species epithet sanchezi comes from the scientist who organized the expedition that discovered the species, as well as capturing the first specimen, Professor Carlos Armando Sanchez Ortiz. As for the common name, initial phase (IP) and juvenile fish have a distinctive black spot at the base of their caudal fins, hence their name, the tailspot wrasse.

== Taxonomy ==
Labridae is a very large group that is broken into smaller subfamilies. H. sanchezi falls into the Julidinae subfamily, which contains the saltwater wrasse. Some of the other subfamilies in Labridae include Scarinae, the parrotfish, previously thought to be their own family, and Cheilininae, which holds the largest wrasse species, the humphead wrasse, which can grow to 180 kg. Most of the diversity in Halichoeres is located in the tropics of the Indian Ocean and Central America. Within its family and subfamily, Halichoeres is one of the most species-rich genera, with over 30 species in the Central American tropics alone. H. sanchezi is most closely related to H. melanotis, which is found in Panama, with its next closest relative being H. salmofasciatus near Cocos Island. Ichthyologists call this group the H. melanotis species complex, as most wrasse in the area are separated by very small genetic differences. The easiest way to differentiate H. sanchezi from these other species is by its namesake spot on the caudal fin.

== Distribution ==
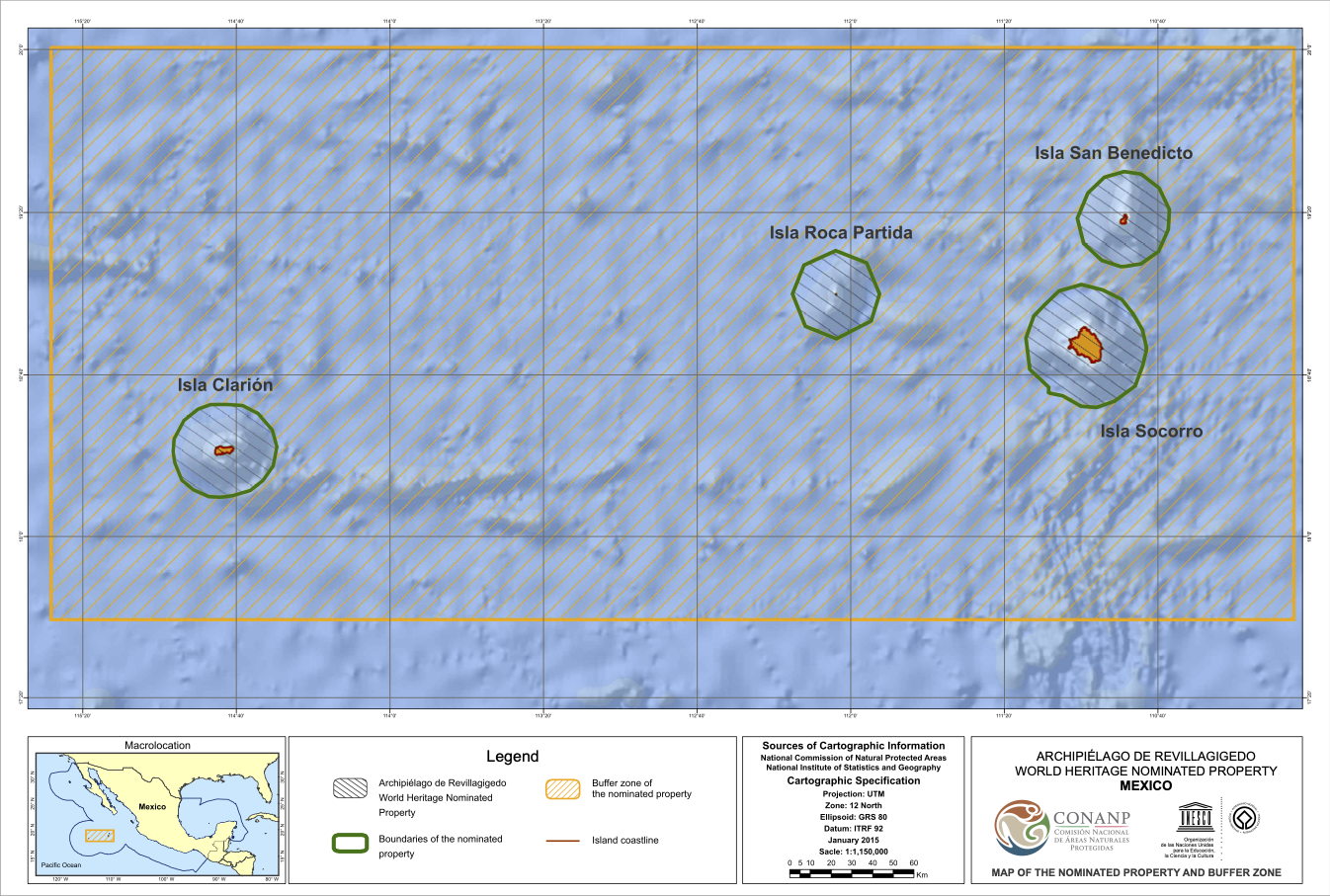
The four islands of the Revillagigedo Archipelago, located off the west coast of Mexico.

H. sanchezi is an endemic species found only in the Revillagigedo Archipelago, four volcanic islands off the coast of Mexico in the tropical eastern Pacific Ocean. The four islands are Roca Partida, Socorro, Clarion, and San Benedicto, with the latter being where samples were collected to identify H. sanchezi as a new species. However, pictures taken by Kreg Martin on Socorro Island in 2013 were retroactively identified as H. sanchezi, so they may not be exclusive to San Benedicto.

H. sanchezi was only seen at one site on San Benedicto Island during its discovery, a relatively flat, rocky plain south of the island. The site is around 21-22 meters deep with volcanic rock of varying sizes on the floor. Most of the rock is dark in color, with some patches of white rock. Juvenile H. sanchezi stayed close to the bottom, but bigger IP and terminal phase (TP) individuals were found higher in the water. Both groups were observed near boulders of the volcanic rock, which could provide protection if a predator approached.

== Description ==
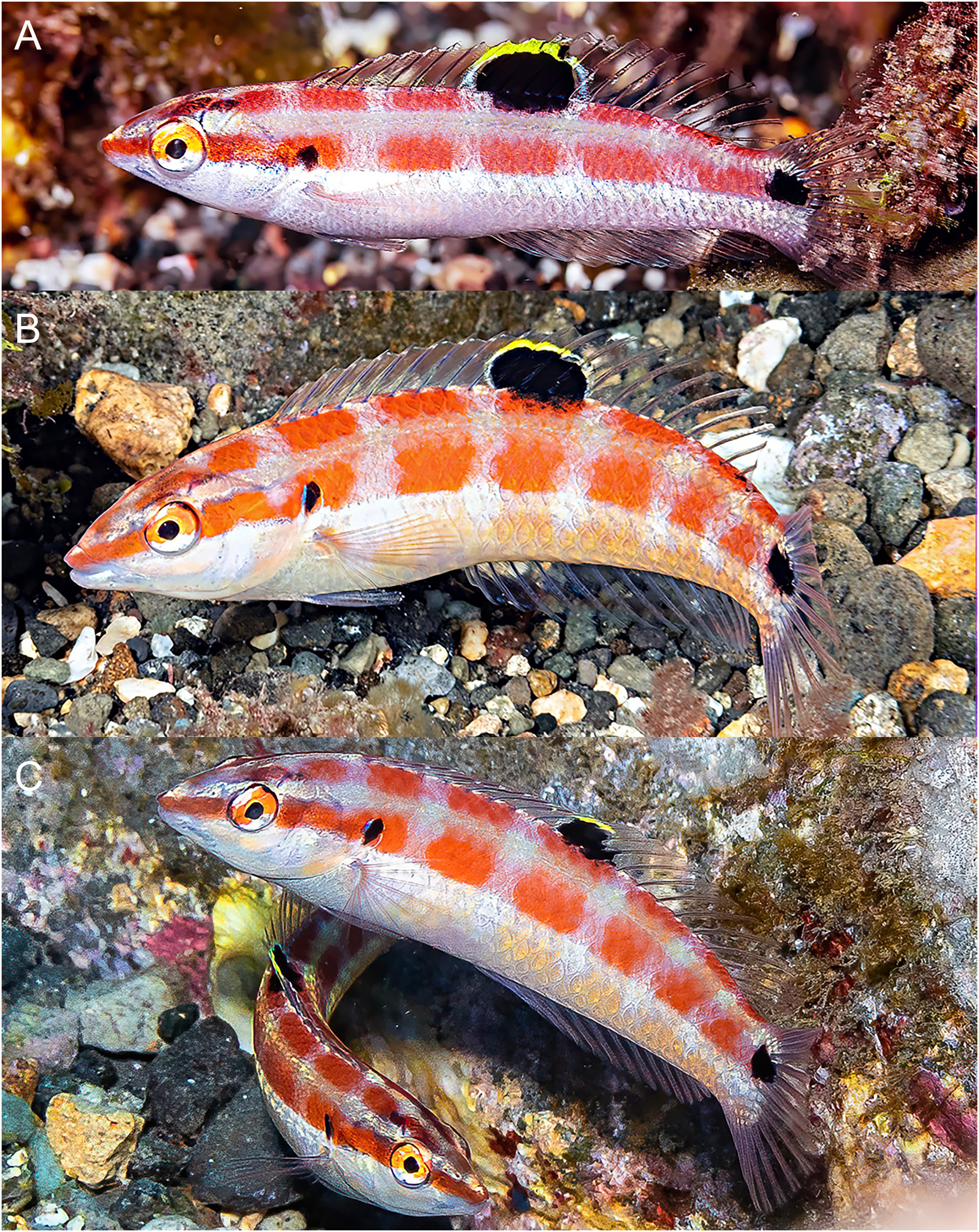
(A) Small juvenile. (B) Large juvenile. (C) Initial phase adult.

H. sanchezi has a fusiform body shape, with large TP males being around 120 mm in size, while juveniles and IP fish range from 30-50 mm. The dorsal fin runs from just behind the head to right before the caudal peduncle with 9 spines and 12 rays. Pectoral fins are fan-shaped with 13 rays, and the pelvic fins are thoracic, 1 spine and 5 rays. The anal fin begins at the midsection of the fish; the 3 spines and 12 rays are of similar size to those of the dorsal fin. Finally, the caudal fin has 12 rays with the central 4 being segmented. Fin rays are an important way to distinguish one species from another, especially in species-rich families such as Labridae, where it can be difficult to tell close relatives from one another.

Their mouths are small and terminal, with two enlarged pairs of canines on the upper and lower jaws, followed by a row of 10-15 caniniform/conical teeth. Eyes are medium-sized, 5.5 mm. Their gill rakers are short, as they do not need the longer gill rakers found in filter-feeding fish. They have thin, cycloid scales, but not on the head, save for some irregular patches of scales where the head meets the body.

Juveniles and IP fish tend to be more brightly colored and patterned, becoming muted if they transition to TP males. Initial phase fish are a bright orange color dorsally with a gray ventral side. The orange is broken up by one lateral reddish band, and when disturbed, forms vertical bands, giving their dorsum a checkered appearance. Their irises are white and orange, with the orange part lining up with the orange on their dorsum. IP fins are mostly translucent with some brown to purplish color in the rays. They have three distinct black spots, the smallest of which is right above the pectoral fin, behind the gills. The next largest is at the base of the caudal fin, right above the midline of the fish. Finally, the largest of the three is about midway through the dorsal fin, with a yellow border around the black spot. Juveniles look very similar to IP fish, but their dorsal and caudal spots tend to be larger. Research suggests that this black spot on the caudal fin mimics the eye of a larger predator, scaring off would-be predators of H. sanchezi, which explains why it is larger on the smaller juveniles, as they need additional protection from predation.

Terminal phase males have a reddish-orange head that transitions into a brownish-orange dorsum with a yellow ventral side. The opercular flap is darker than the rest of the head, with purple and black patches. Their scales are lighter, more yellow, on the anterior side and darker brown on the posterior side, creating a crosshatch pattern on the body. Where their caudal peduncle transitions into caudal fin is black, covering the whole peduncle and the proximal half of the dorsal fin. Fins range from yellow to orange to brown, becoming less saturated the more distal they are. The iris is a pronounced shade of reddish-orange. TP males have a small black spot on their dorsal fin, on the membrane between the first and second rays.

== Life history ==
H. sanchezi are hermaphrodites, most often protogynous. The largest female in a given area can change its sex to male in order to reproduce with other, smaller females. Additionally, the Halichoeres genus is monandric, meaning all individuals are born female, the only males are those that have transitioned. An initial phase wrasse is female, having not yet gone through any transition, but a terminal phase wrasse is a dominant male, having transitioned from female. This hermaphrodite lifestyle ensures there are always available males to breed with females, aiding in the overall reproductive success of the population. While the most common transition is from female to male, some research on other Halichoeres species has shown that a detransition of a TP male back to being female is possible if a larger male enters the territory. This could be because it is better for the TP male to revert to being female rather than try to fight the new male for the territory.

While H. sanchezi development has not been studied due to the remote nature of their habitat and recent discovery, they likely develop similarly to other wrasses. Juveniles mature into adult IP fish, keeping their coloration and general proportions. Only some wrasse become terminal phase adults, these are the territory-holding males. Whatever female is the largest in the area undergoes a change in hormones, allowing her to transition to male and mate with the remaining IP females. This change is accompanied by a change in coloration and size. Researchers are still uncertain how this delicate process plays out, as many hormones and environmental factors come together to determine which females transition and how it occurs.

While H. sanchezi’s exact diet is uncertain, it can be inferred from the diets of their close relatives. Wrasses tend to eat during the day and consume mostly hard-shelled organisms. This includes crustaceans, mollusks, and echinoderms. Wrasse are capable of eating these shelled organisms because of their specialized mouths, with strong muscles that connect their mandibles to the maxilla, providing the crushing force needed to break open exoskeletons and shells.

== Conservation status ==
H. sanchezi currently does not have an IUCN listing. Its closest relative, H. melanotis, is listed as least concern. However, H. sanchezi has some key differences that could give it a different classification. There is no current estimate for the abundance of H. sanchezi, as it was only recently discovered and is endemic to a remote area. While the remoteness of its habitat does protect it from active human disturbance, it lives in a delicate position. With it only being found in a single location near one of the four islands, it has a very small habitat in which it can survive. If conditions were to change around the Revillagigedo Archipelago, H. sanchezi would have nowhere to escape to, as the odds of survival traversing the open ocean would be low. These changes could include a rise in temperature, the introduction of an invasive competitor, or increased human activity.

Members of the Labridae family are often victims of the exotic pet trade, captured from the wild and bred or sold immediately to collectors. While the Revillagigedo Archipelago is remote, if a demand arose for the fish, poaching would follow, hence the need for anti-poaching legislation and established protected areas. It is not large or abundant enough to have a fishery for human consumption, so poaching for the pet trade would be its main allure to fishermen.
