= Mountain Time Zone =

Time zone of North America

- Time zone
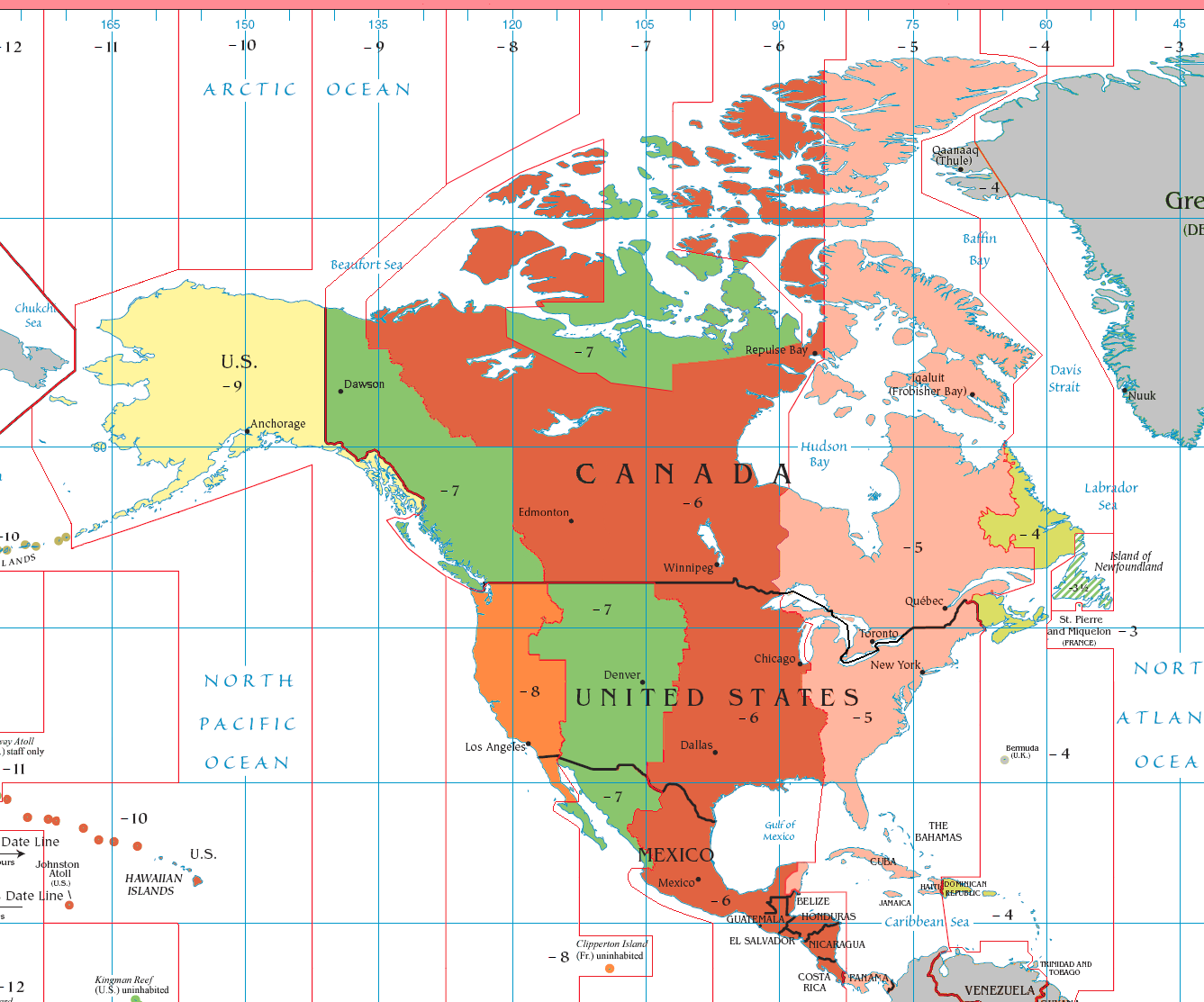
- Mountain Time Zone Shown offsets are Standard

UTC offset
- MST: UTC−07:00
- MDT: UTC−06:00

Current time
- :: MST [refresh]

Observance of DST
- DST is observed in some of this time zone.

The Mountain Time Zone of North America keeps time by subtracting seven hours from Coordinated Universal Time (UTC) when standard time (UTC−07:00) is in effect, and by subtracting six hours during daylight saving time (UTC−06:00).

In Canada and the United States, this time zone is generically called Mountain Time (MT). Specifically, it is Mountain Standard Time (MST) when observing standard time, and Mountain Daylight Time (MDT) when observing daylight saving time. The term refers to the Rocky Mountains.

Baja California Sur, Sinaloa, and Sonora in Mexico, and most of Arizona in the United States, do not observe daylight saving time (DST), and during the spring, summer, and autumn months they are on the same time as Pacific Daylight Time. The Canadian province of British Columbia and Yukon observe permanent daylight saving time in the Pacific Time Zone, which is equivalent to year-round Mountain Standard Time.

The largest city in the Mountain Time Zone is Phoenix, Arizona; the Phoenix metropolitan area is the largest metropolitan area in the zone. The largest city that observes daylight saving time is Juárez, Chihuahua, Mexico.

The clock time in this zone is based on the mean solar time at the 105th meridian west of the Greenwich Observatory. In the United States, the exact specification for the location of time zones and the dividing lines between zones is set forth in the Code of Federal Regulations at 49 CFR 71. (Note: The specification for the Mountain Time Zone in the United States is set forth at 49 CFR 71.8. The boundary between Central and Mountain time zones is set forth at 49 CFR 71.7, and the boundary between Mountain and Pacific time zones is set forth at 49 CFR 71.9.)

== Canada ==
One territory is fully contained in the Mountain Time Zone:

- Yukon (no DST)

One province is split between the Mountain Time Zone and the Central Time Zone:

- British Columbia – all except Regional District of East Kootenay, Town of Golden, and Columbia-Shuswap Regional District Area A

One territory is split between the Mountain Time Zone, the Central Time Zone, and the Eastern Time Zone:

- Nunavut – Kitikmeot Region

On September 24, 2020, Yukon switched to the Mountain Standard Time year-round. Previously, the territory had used the Pacific Time Zone with daylight saving time: UTC−8 in winter and UTC−7 in summer.

On March 8, 2026, most of British Columbia in the Pacific Time Zone adopted UTC−7 year-round but continue to call their time zone "Pacific Time" with a new abbreviation of "PCT".

Alberta observed Mountain Time with daylight saving until 2026, when it switched to Central Standard Time (UTC−06:00) year-round. The western half of Saskatchewan observed Mountain Time without daylight saving until 1972 when it joined the rest of the province in Central Standard Time.

Following Alberta's switch to Central Standard Time year-round, on August 14, 2026, the Regional District of East Kootenay in southeastern BC also switched to Central Standard Time year-round from Mountain Time with daylight saving to maintain its alignment with Alberta. The Town of Golden and Columbia-Shuswap Regional District, which were also previously on Mountain Time with daylight saving time, originally adopted permanent standard time on September 1, 2026, planning to sync the localities with the rest of BC besides the Regional District of East Kootenay by moving an hour back on November 1, 2026. However, on September 22, 2026, this decision was reversed and the two municipalities opted to adopt Central Standard Time year-round, retaining continuity with Alberta and East Kootenay.

Similarly, the Northwest Territories observed Mountain Time with daylight saving until 2026 before switching to Central Standard Time year-round on August 21, 2026.

== Mexico ==
As of October 30, 2022, Mexico abandoned daylight saving time, with certain exceptions. The following states have an offset equal to Mountain Standard Time, there called the Zona Pacífico (lit. 'Pacific Zone'):

- Baja California Sur
- Nayarit: except for the Bahía de Banderas municipality, which uses the Central Time Zone.
- Sonora
- Sinaloa
- Chihuahua: Observes Daylight Savings Time, only in northwestern border municipalities (Janos, Ascensión, Juárez, Guadalupe, and Práxedis Gilberto Guerrero)
- Revillagigedo Islands (Colima): three of the four islands have the same time as Mountain Time Zone: Socorro Island, San Benedicto Island and Roca Partida.

The following states have an offset equal to Mountain Daylight Time or Central Standard Time, there called the Zona Centro (Central Zone):

- Aguascalientes
- Campeche
- Chihuahua, except for the northwestern border area (which follows MST/MDT) and northeastern border area (follows CST/CDT)
- Ciudad de México
- Coahuila, except for northern border areas (CST/CDT)
- Colima, except all of the Revillagigedo Islands.
- Chiapas
- Durango
- Guanajuato
- Guerrero
- Hidalgo
- Jalisco
- México
- Michoacán
- Morelos
- Nuevo León, except for northern border areas (CST/CDT)
- Oaxaca
- Puebla
- Querétaro
- San Luis Potosí
- Tabasco
- Tamaulipas, except for northern border areas (CST/CDT)
- Tlaxcala
- Veracruz
- Yucatán
- Zacatecas
- Municipality of Bahía de Banderas in Nayarit

== United States ==
Six states are fully contained in the Mountain Time Zone:

- Colorado
- Montana
- New Mexico
- Utah
- Wyoming
- Arizona (does not observe daylight saving time except for Navajo Nation)

Three states are split between the Mountain Time Zone and the Pacific Time Zone. The following locations observe Mountain Time:

- Idaho: Southern Idaho and the portion of Idaho County south of the Salmon River
- Oregon: the majority of Malheur County
- Nevada: West Wendover
  - The communities of Jackpot, Jarbidge, Mountain City, and Owyhee unofficially observe Mountain Time, although they are officially within the Pacific Time Zone.

Six states are split between the Mountain Time Zone and the Central Time Zone. The following locations observe Mountain Time:

- Kansas: Sherman, Wallace, Greeley and Hamilton counties
- Nebraska: western one third
- North Dakota: the southwest corner counties (Adams, Billings, Bowman, Golden Valley, Grant, Hettinger, Slope, Stark) observe MST. The counties of McKenzie, Dunn, and Sioux are split.
- Oklahoma: Kenton (Oklahoma is legally completely in Central time, but Kenton unofficially uses Mountain time)
- South Dakota: western half
- Texas: El Paso, Hudspeth, and northwestern Culberson counties

== Major metropolitan areas ==
Alphabetical list of major cities located within the Mountain Time Zone. Cities in bold do not observe daylight saving time:

- Albuquerque, New Mexico
- Billings, Montana
- Boise, Idaho
- Boulder, Colorado
- Casper, Wyoming
- Cheyenne, Wyoming
- Ciudad Juárez, Chihuahua
- **Ciudad Obregón, Sonora**
- Colorado Springs, Colorado
- **Culiacán, Sinaloa**
- Metropolitan Denver
  - Arvada, Colorado
  - Aurora, Colorado
  - Centennial, Colorado
  - Denver, Colorado
  - Lakewood, Colorado
  - Westminster, Colorado
- El Paso, Texas
- **Flagstaff, Arizona**
- Fort Collins, Colorado
- Greeley, Colorado
- **Hermosillo, Sonora**
- **La Paz, Baja California Sur**
- Lake Havasu City, Arizona
- Las Cruces, New Mexico
- **Los Mochis, Sinaloa**
- **Mazatlán, Sinaloa**
- Missoula, Montana
- **Nogales, Sonora**
- **Metropolitan Phoenix**
  - **Chandler, Arizona**
  - **Gilbert, Arizona**
  - **Glendale, Arizona**
  - **Mesa, Arizona**
  - **Peoria, Arizona**
  - **Phoenix, Arizona**
  - **Surprise, Arizona**
  - **Tempe, Arizona**
- Pueblo, Colorado
- Rapid City, South Dakota
- St. George, Utah
- **San Luis Río Colorado, Sonora**
- **Tepic, Nayarit**
- **Tucson, Arizona**
- Wasatch Front
  - Orem, Utah
  - Provo, Utah
  - Salt Lake City, Utah
  - Sandy, Utah
  - West Jordan, Utah
  - West Valley City, Utah
- **Vancouver, British Columbia**
- **Yuma, Arizona**

== See also ==
- Effects of time zones on North American broadcasting
