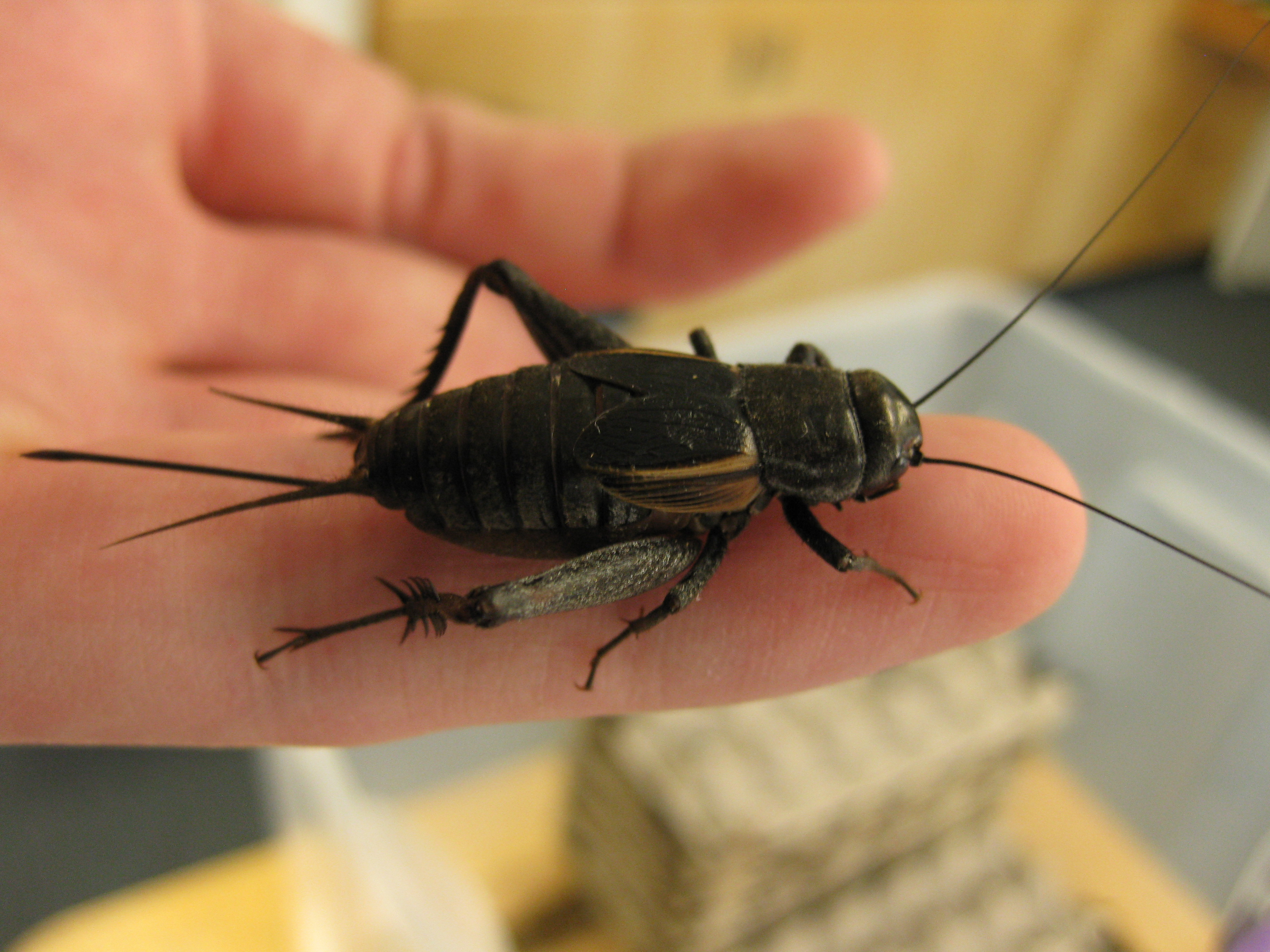

Scientific classification
- Domain: Eukaryota
- Kingdom: Animalia
- Phylum: Arthropoda
- Class: Insecta
- Order: Orthoptera
- Suborder: Ensifera
- Family: Gryllidae
- Tribe: Gryllini
- Genus: Gryllus
- Species: G. ovisopis

Binomial name
- Gryllus ovisopis T. J. Walker, 1974

= Gryllus ovisopis =

Species of cricket

Gryllus ovisopis, the taciturn wood cricket, is a species of cricket in the subfamily Gryllinae. It is found in North America. It shares a range with Gryllus fultoni.
