= Plebeiogryllus =

Scientific classification
- Domain: Eukaryota
- Kingdom: Animalia
- Phylum: Arthropoda
- Class: Insecta
- Order: Orthoptera
- Suborder: Ensifera
- Family: Gryllidae
- Subfamily: Gryllinae
- Tribe: Gryllini
- Genus: Plebeiogryllus; Randell, 1964

Genus of crickets

Plebeiogryllus is a genus of crickets in the family Gryllidae and tribe Gryllini. Species have been found in the Indian subcontinent, southern China, Indo-China and the Philippines.

== Species ==
Plebeiogryllus includes the following species:

- Plebeiogryllus guttiventris (Walker, 1871)
- Plebeiogryllus plebejus (Saussure, 1877) - type species (as Gryllus plebejus Saussure locality: the Philippines)
- Plebeiogryllus retiregularis Saeed, Saeed & Yousuf, 2000
- Plebeiogryllus spurcatus (Walker, 1869)
