= Gryllus brevicaudus =

Scientific classification
- Kingdom: Animalia
- Phylum: Arthropoda
- Class: Insecta
- Order: Orthoptera
- Suborder: Ensifera
- Family: Gryllidae
- Tribe: Gryllini
- Genus: Gryllus
- Species: G. brevicaudus

Binomial name
- Gryllus brevicaudus Weissman, Rentz & Alexander, 1980

Species of cricket

Gryllus brevicaudus, the short-tailed field cricket, is a species of cricket in the subfamily Gryllinae. It is found in North America.
