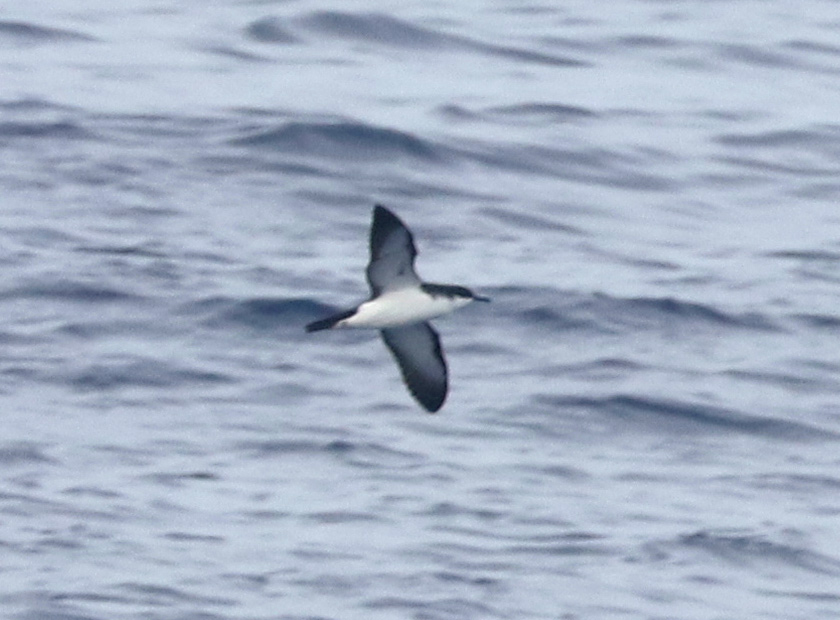

Conservation status
- Critically Endangered (IUCN 3.1)

- Threatened (ESA)

Scientific classification
- Kingdom: Animalia
- Phylum: Chordata
- Class: Aves
- Order: Procellariiformes
- Family: Procellariidae
- Genus: Puffinus
- Species: P. newelli

Binomial name
- Puffinus newelli Henshaw, 1900

Synonyms
- Pufinus auricularis newelli Puffinus puffinus newelli

= Newell's shearwater =

Species of bird

Newell's shearwater or Hawaiian shearwater (ʻaʻo), (Puffinus newelli) is a seabird in the family Procellariidae. It belongs to a confusing group of shearwaters which are difficult to identify and whose classification is controversial. It was formerly treated as a subspecies of the Manx shearwater (Puffinus puffinus) and is now often placed in Townsend's shearwater (Puffinus auricularis).

This shearwater is the only seabird endemic to the Hawaiian Islands. Its Hawaiian name "ʻaʻo" comes from the sound of its call. Native Hawaiians regarded the ʻaʻo's haunting song as an omen of death.

== Description ==
It is a fairly small shearwater, 33 centimetres (13 in) in length. The wing is 223–249 millimetres (8.8–9.8 in) long and the tail is 78.9–88.8 millimetres (3.11–3.50 in). The bird weighs 0.340–0.425 kilograms (0.75–0.94 lb). The upperparts are black with a brown tinge while the underparts are white. The dark colouration on the face extends below the eye and is sharply separated from the white throat. There is a white patch on the flanks, extending onto the sides of the rump. The underwings are mainly white with a dark border. The undertail-coverts have a black and white pattern and appear white in the field. The bill is dark grey or brown and the legs and feet are mainly pale pink. The bird flies low over the water on stiff wings with a mixture of short glides and periods of rapid flapping. It utters a donkey-like braying call around the breeding areas. Townsend's shearwater (P. auricularis) is very similar but has dark undertail-coverts, a shorter tail and a less sharp boundary between the black and white on the face.

== Systematics ==
It was described as a new species Puffinus newelli in 1900 by the American ornithologist Henry Wetherbee Henshaw using specimens obtained by Brother Matthias Newell from residents of Maui. It was later included by some authors in the Manx shearwater (Puffinus puffinus) as was Townsend's shearwater (Puffinus auricularis). Later, Townsends's shearwater was raised back to species status with Newell's shearwater as a subspecies of it. This taxonomy was followed by the American Ornithologists' Union from the sixth edition of its checklist onwards.

However Newell's differs from Townsend's shearwater in various measurements and has a different breeding season and marine habitat. It is now often treated as a separate species, e.g. by BirdLife International following Brooke (2004). In 2004, a study of mitochondrial DNA sequences suggested a close relationship between Rapa shearwater (Puffinus myrtae) and Newell's shearwater and the authors proposed that Rapa shearwater be treated as a subspecies of P. newelli pending further study. The Rapa shearwater is now treated as a full species.

== Distribution ==
It breeds in at least 20 colonies on mountain slopes in the Hawaiian Islands. The main colonies are on Kauaʻi, on slopes around the Alakaʻi Plateau, Waipio Valley, Puuao, Waihee Valley, and probably in the Mokolea Mountains. Its distribution on the other islands is uncertain but it is known to breed on Molokaʻi and the island of Hawaiʻi and may breed on Oʻahu, Maui and Lānaʻi. From April to November it can be seen in the waters around the Hawaiian Islands, particularly around Kauaʻi. Outside the breeding season it disperses into the tropical Pacific Ocean. Its distribution at sea is little known but many move south and east into the waters of the Equatorial Counter Current. It has been recorded as far west as the Mariana Islands. In the south there are records from Samoa in September 1977 and American Samoa in January 1993.

== Behaviour ==
=== Feeding ===
It feeds far from land, in areas of deep water (at least 2000 meters). Its diet is little known but includes squid and small fish. It dives into the water to catch its prey, swimming down to a depth of up to 10 meters using its wings to move forward. It is attracted to schools of tuna and gathers in flocks with other seabird species to catch prey driven to the surface by the tuna.

=== Reproduction ===
By 1908, it was thought to be extinct but was rediscovered in 1947 and found breeding on Kauaʻi in 1967. The nest site is a burrow dug into a steep slope, usually sheltered by uluhe (Dicranopteris linearis ferns). A single white egg is laid during the first two weeks of June. Both parents incubate the egg and an incubation period of 62 days has been recorded. The young birds leave the nest in October, 88–100 days after hatching. They fly out to sea and are no longer dependent on their parents. They lay their eggs around May or June in Hawaii.

== Conservation ==
It was formerly a much more common bird with a wider breeding distribution in the islands. It has declined due to habitat loss and predation by introduced species such as mongooses, rats, cats and barn owls. Young birds in particular are attracted to the lights of urban areas at night and many die in collisions with power lines and buildings. The population was estimated at 84,000 birds in the mid-1990s. A severe decline has occurred in recent years which may be associated with the effects of Hurricane Iniki in 1992.
