= Gryllus lineaticeps =

Scientific classification
- Kingdom: Animalia
- Phylum: Arthropoda
- Clade: Pancrustacea
- Class: Insecta
- Order: Orthoptera
- Suborder: Ensifera
- Family: Gryllidae
- Genus: Gryllus
- Species: G. lineaticeps

Binomial name
- Gryllus lineaticeps Stål, 1861

Species of cricket

Gryllus lineaticeps, the variable field cricket, is a species of cricket in the subfamily Gryllinae. It is found in North America.
