= Gryllus vocalis =

Scientific classification
- Kingdom: Animalia
- Phylum: Arthropoda
- Class: Insecta
- Order: Orthoptera
- Suborder: Ensifera
- Family: Gryllidae
- Tribe: Gryllini
- Genus: Gryllus
- Species: G. vocalis

Binomial name
- Gryllus vocalis Scudder, 1901

Synonyms
- Gryllus alogus Rehn, 1902; Gryllus vocalis Scudder, 1901

Species of cricket

Gryllus vocalis, the vocal field cricket, is a species of cricket in the subfamily Gryllinae. It is found in North America.

== Range ==
This insect can be found in desert regions in North America, including Arizona, New Mexico, Texas, and Nevada.
