= Gryllus cayensis =

Scientific classification
- Domain: Eukaryota
- Kingdom: Animalia
- Phylum: Arthropoda
- Class: Insecta
- Order: Orthoptera
- Suborder: Ensifera
- Family: Gryllidae
- Tribe: Gryllini
- Genus: Gryllus
- Species: G. cayensis

Binomial name
- Gryllus cayensis T. J. Walker, 2001

Species of cricket

Gryllus cayensis, known generally as the keys wood cricket or South Florida taciturn wood cricket, is a species of cricket in the subfamily Gryllinae. It is found in North America.
