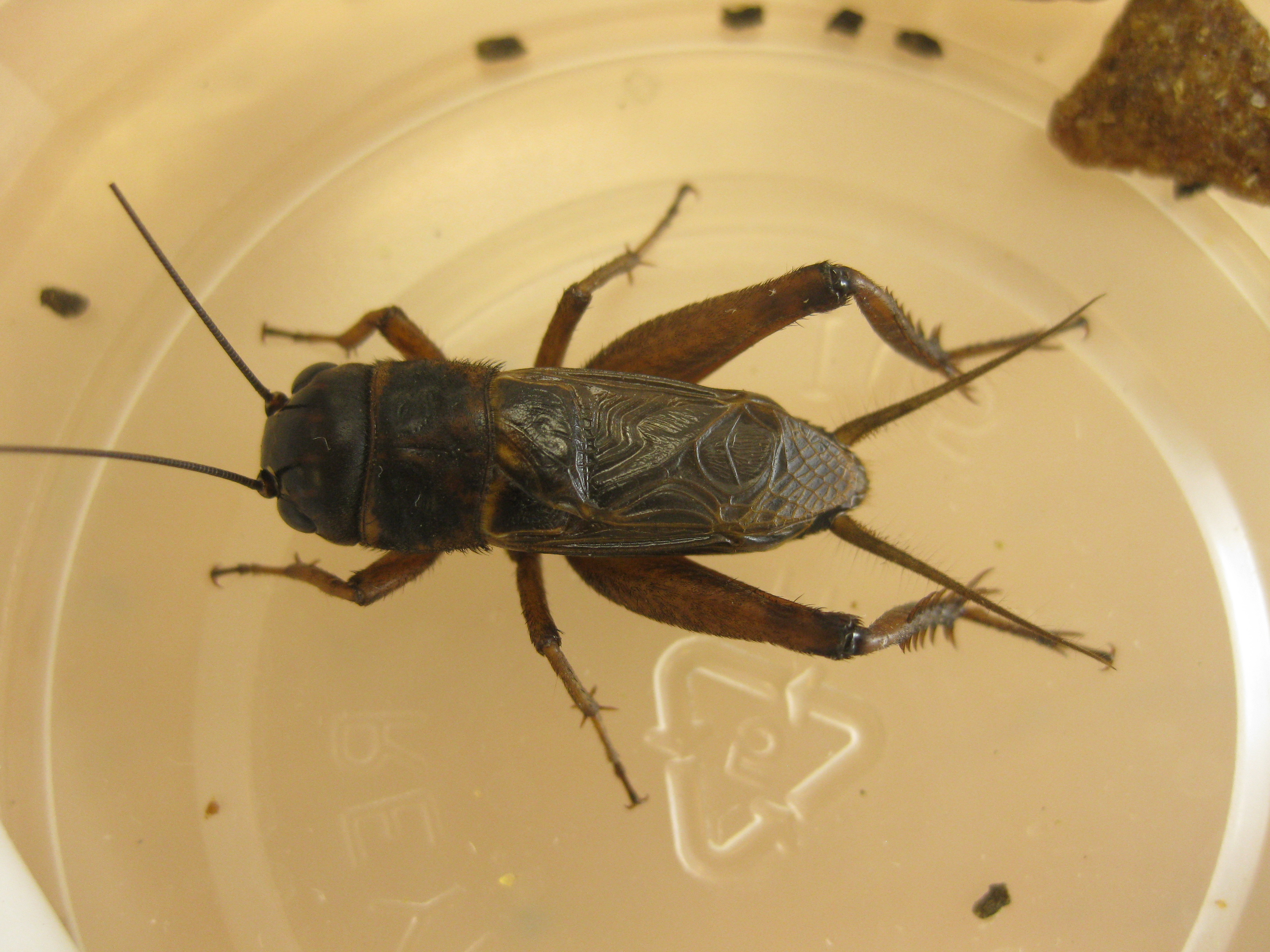
- A male Gryllus bryanti

Scientific classification
- Domain: Eukaryota
- Kingdom: Animalia
- Phylum: Arthropoda
- Class: Insecta
- Order: Orthoptera
- Suborder: Ensifera
- Family: Gryllidae
- Genus: Gryllus
- Species: G. bryanti

Binomial name
- Gryllus bryanti Morse, 1905

= Gryllus bryanti =

Species of cricket

Gryllus bryanti is a species of cricket in the subfamily Gryllinae. G. bryanti lives on islands in the Caribbean Sea, including Eleuthera Island and Andros Island in the Bahamas.

== Morphology ==
Gryllus bryanti is among the larger species of field crickets. Body colour is dark brown with reddish brown around the head, thorax and legs (see images of male and female on this page).

== Habitat ==
Typical of many field crickets, G. bryanti can be found living in cracks or burrows in the ground in disturbed areas (e.g. near roads) and around human habitations.

== Song production ==
Like most gryllids, males produce song by tegminal (forewing) stridulation. Male G. bryanti calling song is distinct from other species of Gryllus in that each chirp consists of only a single pulse (wingstroke) instead of multiple pulses (see image of calling song on this page). Courtship song contains high frequency ticks interspersed amongst lower frequency pulses (see image of courtship song on this page).

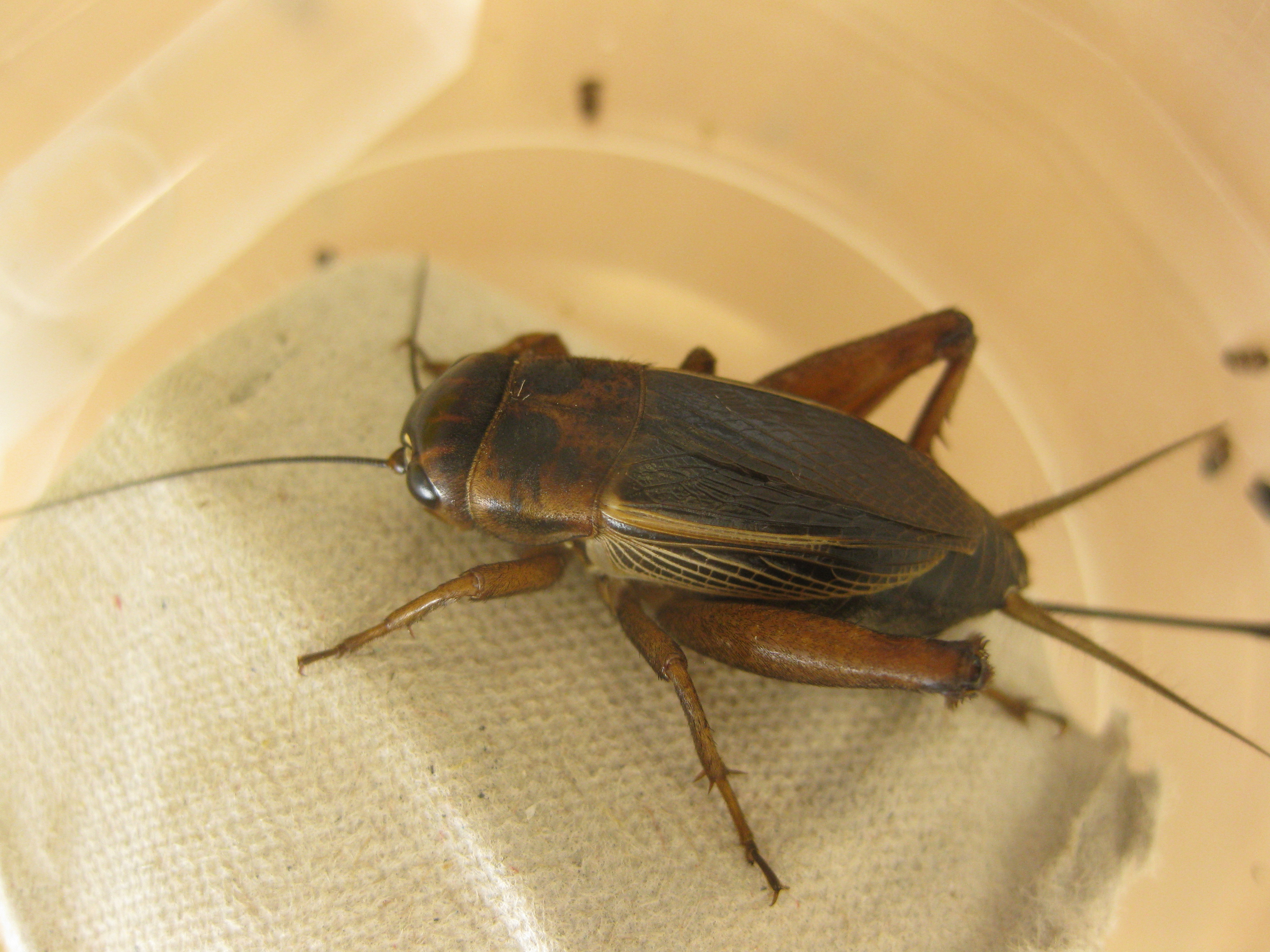
A female Gryllus bryanti

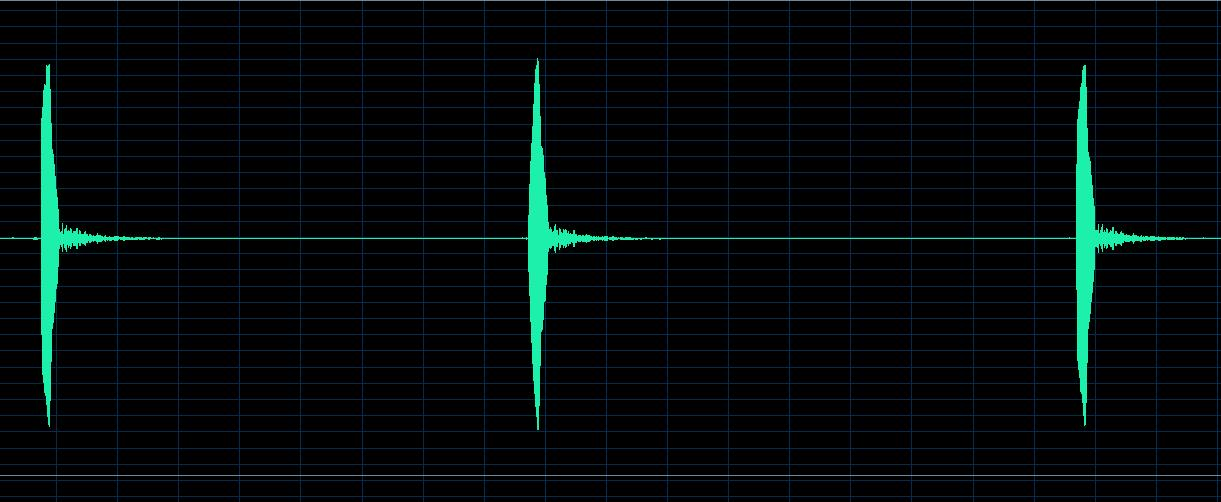
A 2-second section of Gryllus bryanti calling song

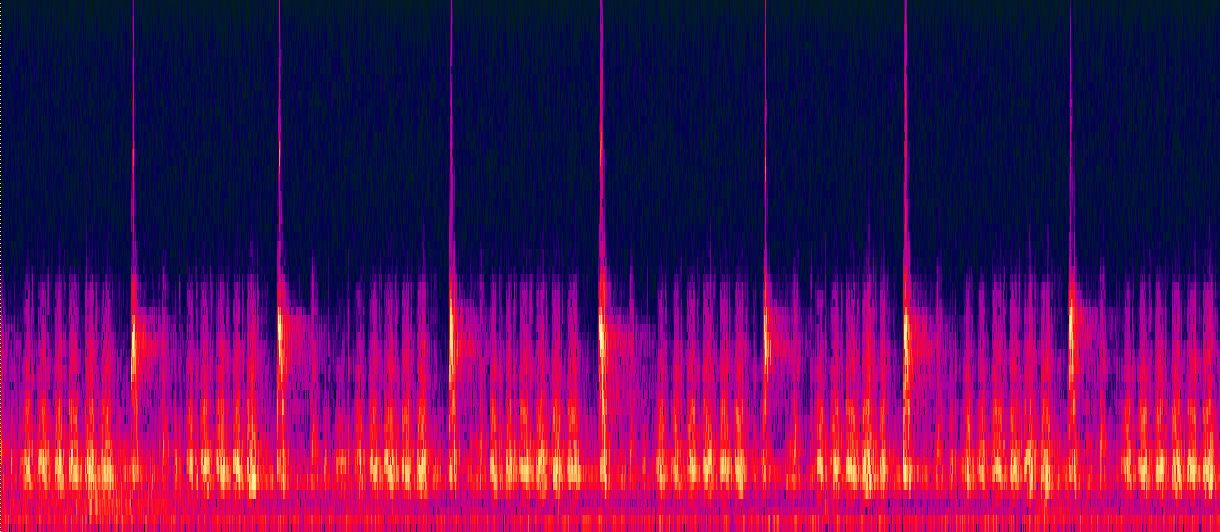
2 seconds of Gryllus bryanti courtship song
