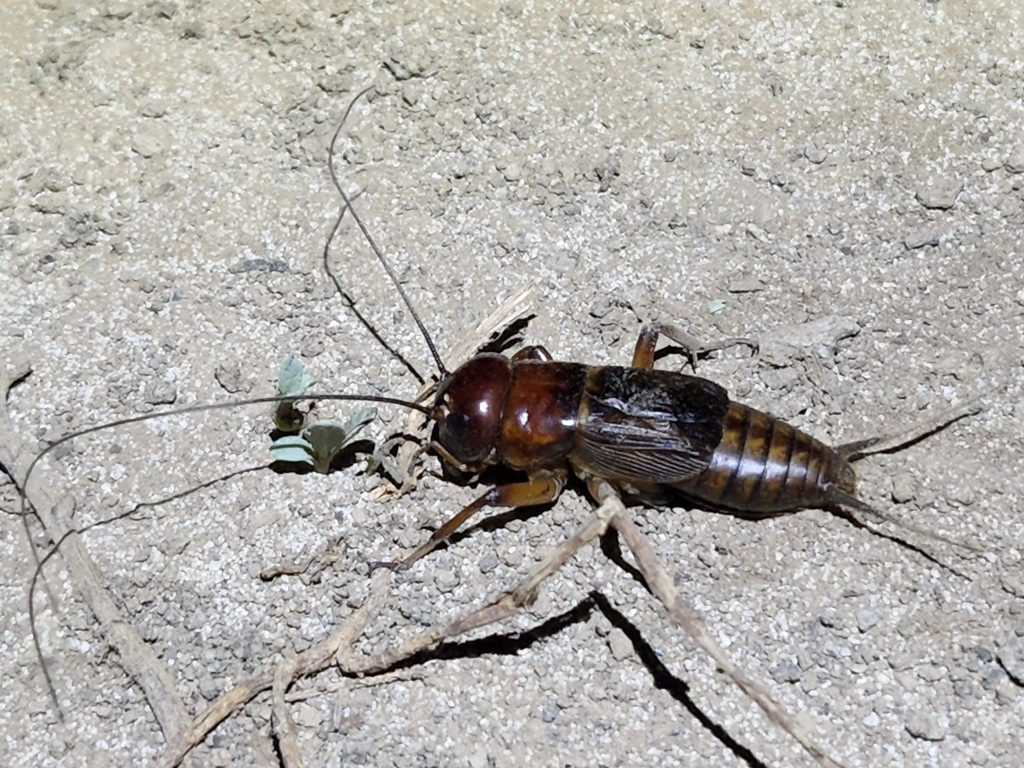

Scientific classification
- Kingdom: Animalia
- Phylum: Arthropoda
- Clade: Pancrustacea
- Class: Insecta
- Order: Orthoptera
- Suborder: Ensifera
- Family: Gryllidae
- Genus: Gryllus
- Species: G. alexanderi

Binomial name
- Gryllus alexanderi Otte & Cowper, 2007
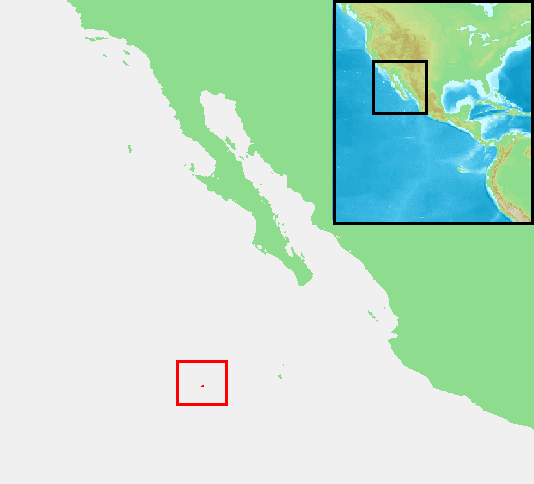
- Clarion Island, where Gryllus alexanderi is found.

= Gryllus alexanderi =

Clarión Cricket

Species of cricket

Gryllus alexanderi, the clarión cricket, (Spanish: Grillo de Clarión) is a species of cricket in the family Gryllidae, the true crickets.

== Distribution ==
Gryllus alexanderi is endemic to Clarion Island, part of the Revillagigedo Islands in Mexico.
