= Clarion Island =

Westernmost of the Revillagigedo Islands

Clarión
Native name: Isla Clarión
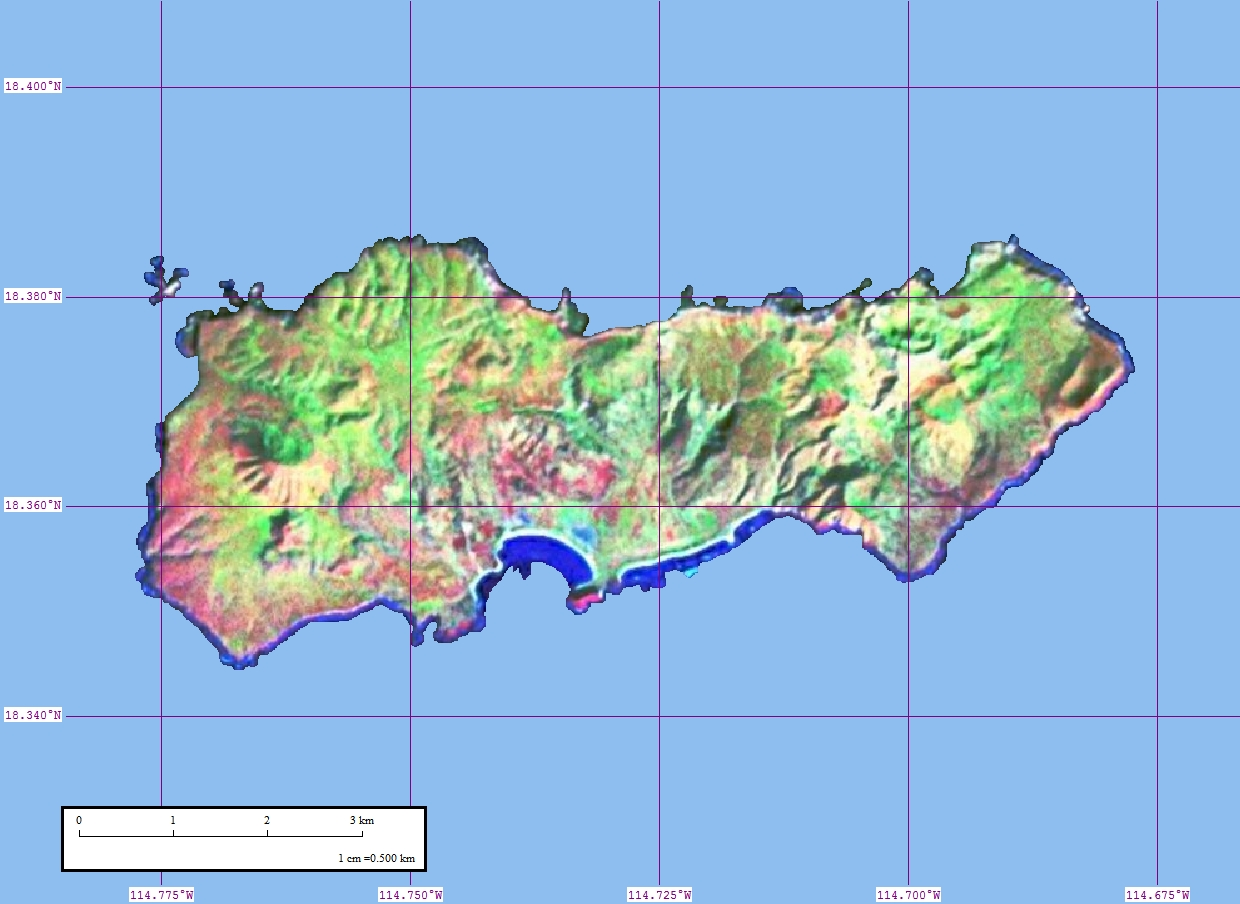
- Clarion Island, from Landsat satellite

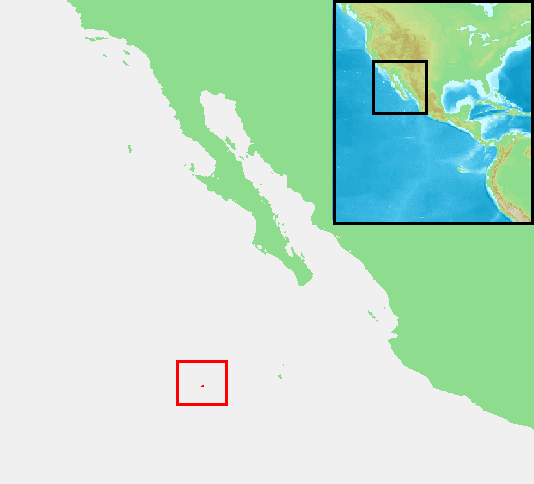

Geography
- Location: Pacific Ocean
- Coordinates: 18°21′30″N 114°43′30″W
- Archipelago: Revillagigedo Islands
- Total islands: 4
- Major islands: San Benedicto, Socorro, Roca Partida & Clarión
- Area: 19.8 km^{2} (7.6 sq mi)
- Length: 8.6 km (5.34 mi)
- Width: 3.7 km (2.3 mi)
- Highest elevation: 335 m (1099 ft)
- Highest point: Mount (Monte) Gallegos

Administration
- Mexico

Demographics
- Population: 9

Clarion Island (Spanish: Isla Clarión), formerly Santa Rosa, is the second largest, westernmost and most remote of Mexico's Revillagigedo Islands, a marine protected area. The island is located 385 kilometres (239 mi) west of Socorro Island and just under 700 kilometres (430 mi) from the Mexican mainland.

It has an area of 19.80 square kilometres (7.64 sq mi) and three prominent peaks. The westernmost and tallest peak, Monte Gallegos, is 335 metres (1,099 ft) high. The central peak is called Monte de la Marina, 280 metres (920 ft), and the eastern peak Pico de la Tienda 292 metres (958 ft). The coasts are backed by perpendicular cliffs, 24 to 183 metres (79 to 600 ft) high, with the exception of the middle part of the southern coast in the vicinity of Bahía Azufre (Sulphur Bay), which is the location of a small military garrison with a contingent of nine soldiers.

Two small and at least temporarily brackish pools are the only source of fresh water; even these may dry up in summers with little rain. Clarion can only be reached by sea, which from Mexico takes 30 hours.

== History ==
No signs to indicate prehistoric human activity have been found on Clarion Island. It was visited in late 1542 by the Spanish navigator Ruy López de Villalobos, but with the exception of a possible re-sighting of the Revillagigedos by Juan Fernández de Ladrillero before 1574 and a short-lived residence by the adventurer Martín Yáñez de Armida on the island he later renamed Socorro (1606), the archipelago was neglected by the Spaniards. Joris van Spilbergen's sighting of the whole group in December 1615 seems not to have been noted in Spain or its American colonies.

Clarion was sighted again by the English privateer George Shelvocke on the Speedwell, August 21, 1721.

The name of the island goes back to the American brig Clarion, Capt. Henry Gyzelaar, who was engaged in the North Pacific trade around 1820.

The Handbook of Selected Pacific Islands (1959), by Edwin B. Doran, observed that "Clarion has never been occupied by man for more than a few days at a time", adding that "there are no facilities of any sort at present."

== Ecology ==
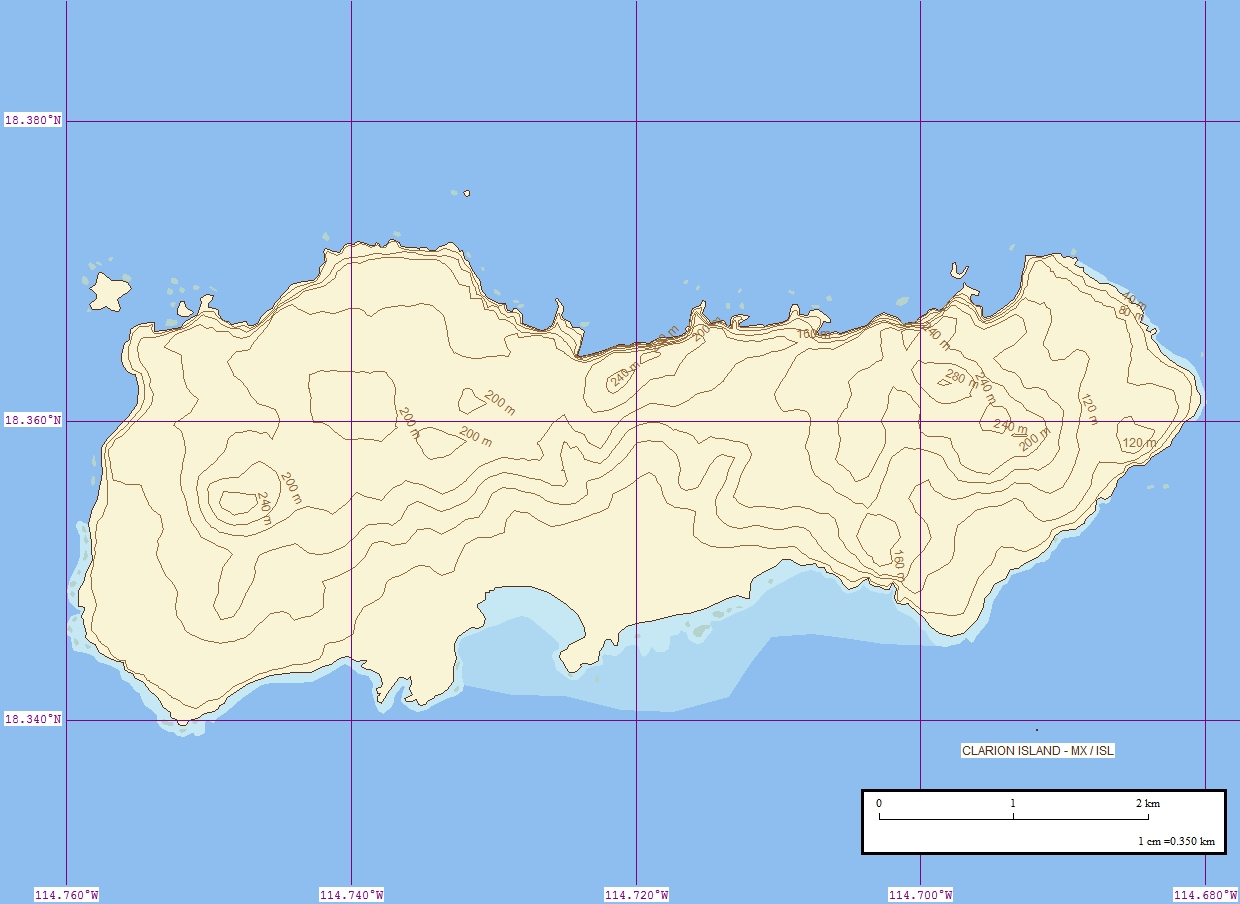
Clarion Island – Marplot Map (1:50,000)

As the topography of Clarion lacks any prominent peaks that could induce rains like Cerro Evermann on Socorro Island, the island is semiarid to arid all over. Consequently, the whole of the island is covered in shrubland, grassland (Note: Tapertip Cupgrass (Eriochloa acuminata), Madagascar Dropseed (Sporobolus pyramidatus), and endemic Aristida tenuifolia: CMICD (2007)) and opuntia cacti. (Note: Probably related to Engelmann's Prickly Pear (O. engelmannii): Brattstrom & Howell (1956)) Far away from land, endemic taxa are fewer than on Socorro but like there mainly consist of landbirds and plants. Rabbits and feral sheep are found on the island and have caused serious harm to the local vegetation; pigs introduced in 1979 have caused harm to the local fauna. Native vertebrates – except birds – are limited to two snake species and one iguanian lizard species, both endemic.

A few seabird species breed on Clarion or formerly did so. The island is near the north(east)ern limit of the breeding range of several of these, but their continued presence needs confirmation:

- Nazca booby, Sula granti
- East Pacific red-footed booby, Sula sula websteri – a doubtfully distinct subspecies
- East Pacific great frigatebird, Fregata minor ridgwayi – breeding suspected but not verified; a doubtfully distinct subspecies

For reasons not fully known, Clarion seems to be more attractive to shorebirds and other vagrant or migrant birds than Socorro; perhaps this is due to the presence of red-tailed hawks on the latter island. Great blue heron, snowy egret, white-faced ibis, Pacific and possibly American golden plover, spotted sandpiper, wandering tattler, ruddy turnstone, black-necked stilt, western gull and barn swallow are examples of the species that can be encountered on Clarion with some regularity; most of the shorebirds congregate in the sheltered shallows of Sulphur Bay. Others, such as blue-winged teal, western sandpiper, least sandpiper, short-eared owl, belted kingfisher, northern mockingbird and brown-headed cowbird have only been recorded on very few occasions, sometimes only once.

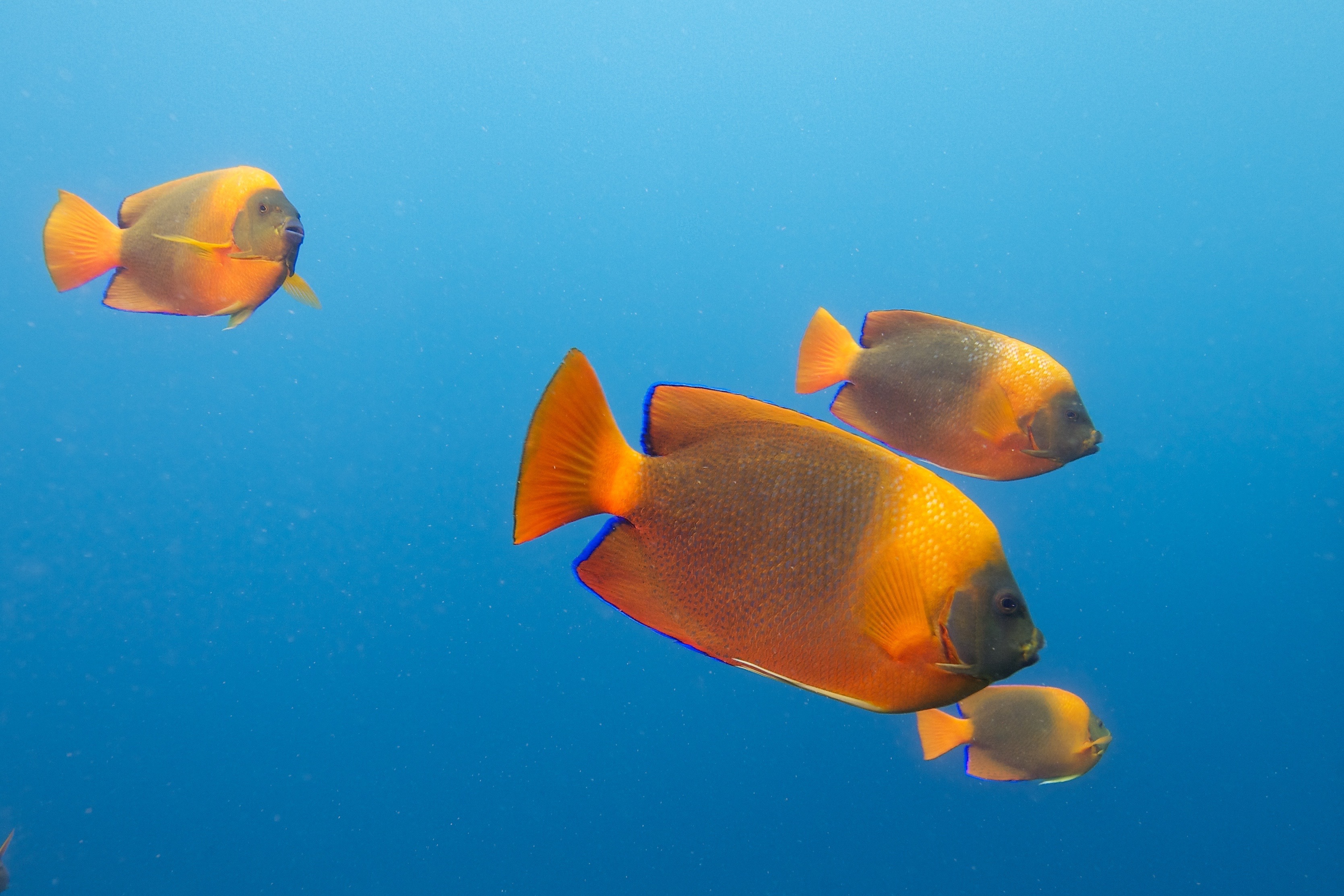
The resident Clarion angelfish is named for the island

=== Endemic animals ===
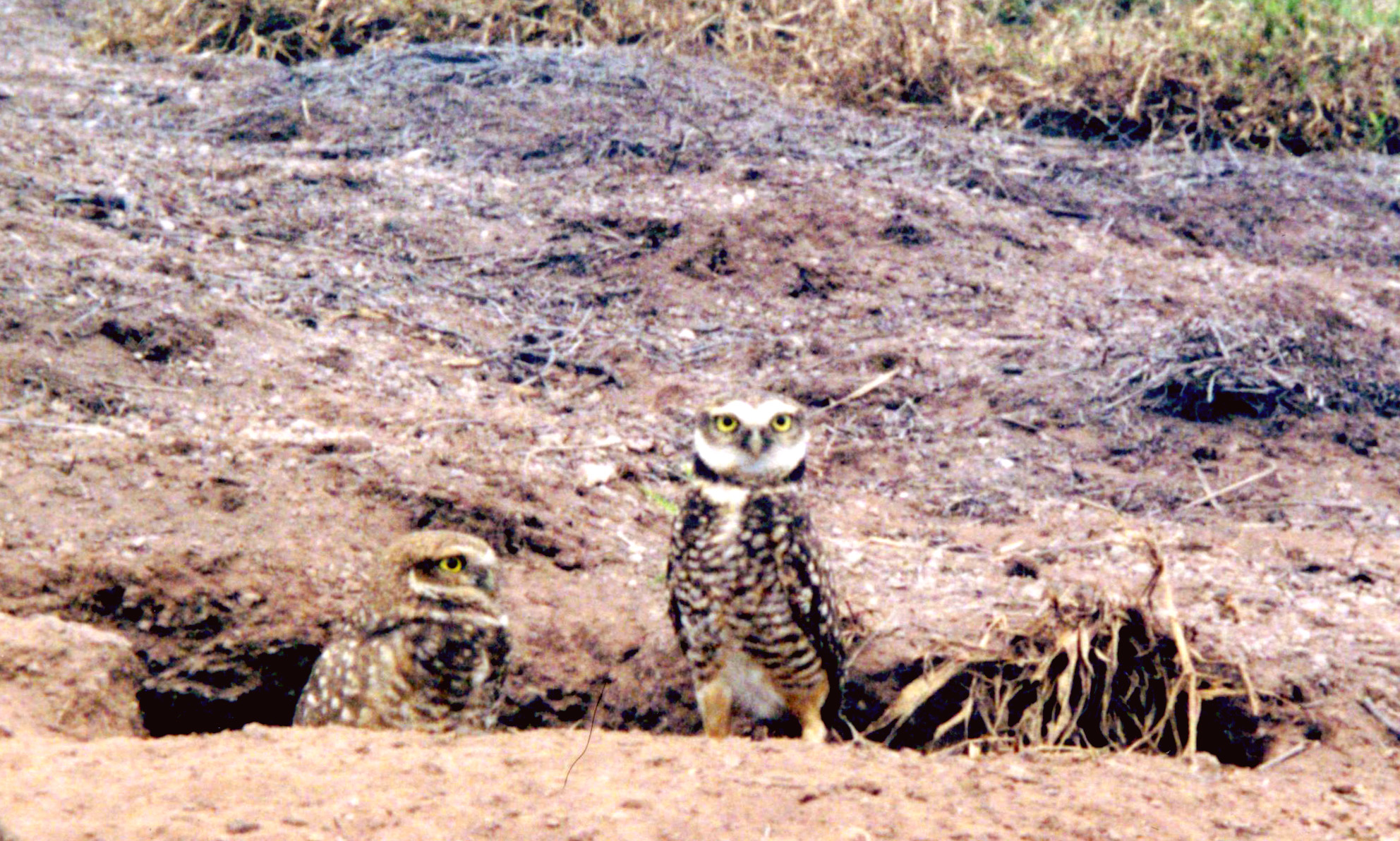
Clarión burrowing owl, February 1997

- Clarión burrowing owl, Athene cunicularia rostrata
- Clarión wren, Troglodytes tanneri (vulnerable)
- Clarión mourning dove, Zenaida macroura clarionensis
- Clarión Island whipsnake, Masticophis anthonyi
- Clarión Island tree lizard, Urosaurus clarionensis
- Clarión nightsnake, Hypsiglena unaocularis
- Clarión cricket, Gryllus alexanderi
- Acanalonia clarionensis - a planthopper

In addition, the local population of the western raven (Corvus corax sinuatus or C. sinuatus) was formerly considered a distinct subspecies clarionensis, but this is not usually accepted at present. It can be expected that this question will soon be resolved as there is currently renewed interest in the phylogeny of the common/western/Chihuahuan ravens. If the Revillagigedos population is indeed distinct, it might be endemic of Clarión as the only other local subpopulation, on San Benedicto, was destroyed by a volcanic eruption on August 1, 1952; on the other hand, mainland birds have sometimes been assigned to clarionensis also.

The Clarión population of the critically endangered Townsend's shearwater (Puffinus auricularis) was probably extirpated in 1988 due to the feral pigs' depredations on the young and nesting birds.

=== Plants ===
Endemic plant taxa of Clarion are:

- Aristida tenuifolia
- Ipomoea halierca
- Physalis clarionensis

Brickellia peninsularis var. amphithalassaBulbostylis nesiotica, Cheilanthes peninsularis var. insularis, Cyperus duripes, Euphorbia anthonyi, Nicotiana stocktonii, Perityle socorrosensis, Spermacoce nesiotica and Zapoteca formosa ssp. rosei are Revillagigedo endemics which Clarion shares with either San Benedicto or Socorro. Whether Teucrium townsendii var. townsendii is the same plant as on San Benedicto is not conclusively determined.

There has not been recent dedicated research on the impact the sheep and rabbits had on the local flora. While no plants seem to have gone extinct on the other Revillagigedo Islands, Clarion is one of the most heavily affected by introduced herbivores.
