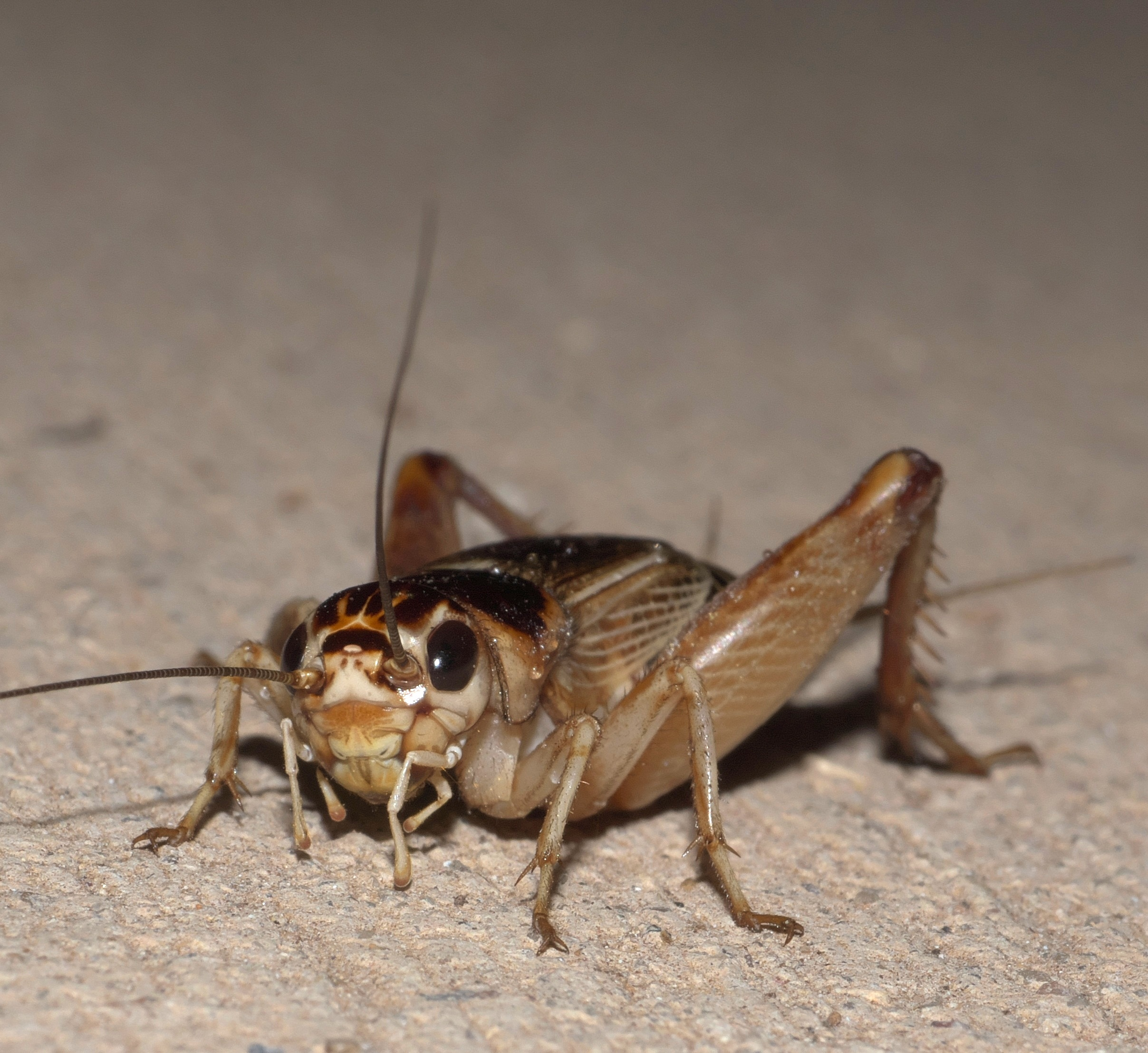
- Gryllus personatus, Texas

Scientific classification
- Domain: Eukaryota
- Kingdom: Animalia
- Phylum: Arthropoda
- Class: Insecta
- Order: Orthoptera
- Suborder: Ensifera
- Family: Gryllidae
- Tribe: Gryllini
- Genus: Gryllus
- Species: G. personatus

Binomial name
- Gryllus personatus Uhler, 1864

= Gryllus personatus =

Species of cricket

Gryllus personatus, the badlands cricket or badlands field cricket, is a species of cricket in the subfamily Gryllinae. It is found in northern Mexico and in the United States north to South Dakota and west to southern California. It typically inhabits desert and dry grassland, including badlands.
