= Plebeiogryllus guttiventris =

Scientific classification
- Domain: Eukaryota
- Kingdom: Animalia
- Phylum: Arthropoda
- Class: Insecta
- Order: Orthoptera
- Suborder: Ensifera
- Family: Gryllidae
- Genus: Plebeiogryllus
- Species: P. guttiventris

Binomial name
- Plebeiogryllus guttiventris (F.Walker, 1871)

Synonyms
- Gryllus guttiventris Walker, 1871

Species of orthoperan

Plebeiogryllus guttiventris is a species of Orthoptera in the family Gryllidae. Two subspecies are recognized. It can be found in India.
