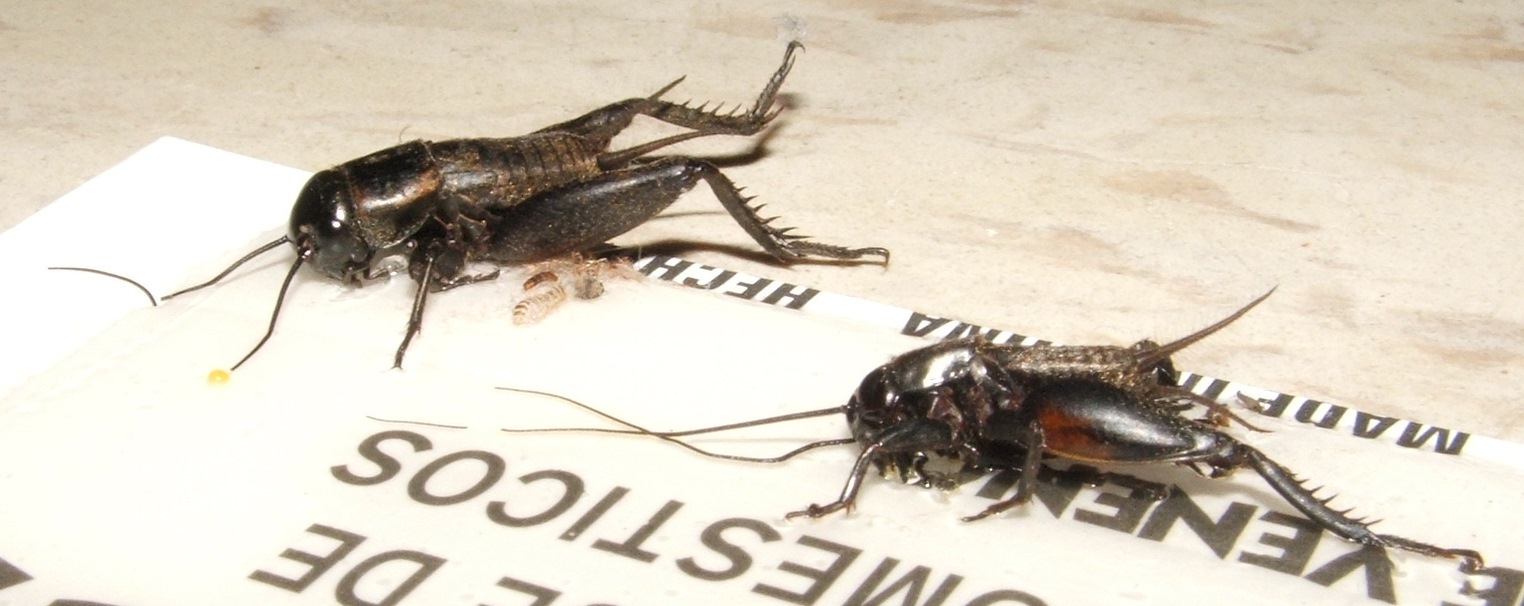
- Two northern wood crickets trapped on glue-based rat traps

Scientific classification
- Domain: Eukaryota
- Kingdom: Animalia
- Phylum: Arthropoda
- Class: Insecta
- Order: Orthoptera
- Suborder: Ensifera
- Family: Gryllidae
- Genus: Gryllus
- Species: G. vernalis

Binomial name
- Gryllus vernalis Blatchley, 1920

Synonyms
- Acheta vernalis; Gryllus assimilis vernalis Blatchley, 1920; Gryllus americanus Blatchley, 1903 (not Drury, 1773)

= Gryllus vernalis =

Northern wood cricket

Species of cricket

Gryllus vernalis, the northern wood cricket, is a species of cricket native to deciduous woods of the midwestern United States, where its primary habitat is leaf litter. It can be identified by its totally black exoskeleton (with the occasional red patch on the femora) and its wide pronotum.
