= Townsend's shearwater =

Conservation status
- Critically Endangered (IUCN 3.1)

Scientific classification
- Kingdom: Animalia
- Phylum: Chordata
- Class: Aves
- Order: Procellariiformes
- Family: Procellariidae
- Genus: Puffinus
- Species: P. auricularis

Binomial name
- Puffinus auricularis Townsend, CH, 1890

Synonyms
- Puffinus auricularis auricularis

Species of bird

Townsend's shearwater (Puffinus auricularis) is a rare seabird of the tropics from the family Procellariidae.

== Taxonomy ==
Its relationships are unresolved. Its closest relatives are probably, but not certainly, the Hawaiian shearwater (Puffinus newelli) and possibly the Manx shearwater (Puffinus puffinus) (Austin, 1996; Austin et al., 2004). It formerly contained the former as a subspecies and was long considered a subspecies of the latter. The relationship of the Rapa shearwater, P. myrtae in regard to these species are also in need of research; this taxon was until recently placed in P. assimilis (Austin et al., 2004), but now raised to full species status by the IOC and the NACC (North American Classification Committee) of the AOU.

== Conservation ==
This species breeds around Cerro Evermann on Isla Socorro in the Revillagigedo Islands, Mexico, though formerly present on Clarion Island and San Benedicto. The main threat to this species comes from feral cats introduced to Socorro in the early 1970s. These cats usually prey on shearwaters immediately after landing, where a lack of understory renders them exposed. Sheep and goats are also destroying breeding habitat. The Isla Clarión was eradicated in 1988, when habitat and nesting sites were destroyed by introduced pigs, sheep and rabbits, the final of which competed against the shearwaters for nesting burrows. Despite this, some breeding habitat remains to the north and north-west of Socorro's summit, where introduced animals have yet to ravage. The current mature population is estimated between 249 and 999 birds. Due to the presence of these threats, it has been classified as critically endangered. Further threat is posed by light pollution from a recently constructed airstrip and possible volcanic eruptions, the latter eradicated the San Benedicto population. Sheep and pigs have since been eradicated from Clarion, though rabbits have yet to follow. On Socorro, sheep eradication is currently in progress.

The species is named for Charles Haskins Townsend (1859–1944), an eminent American ornithologist and ichthyologist.
