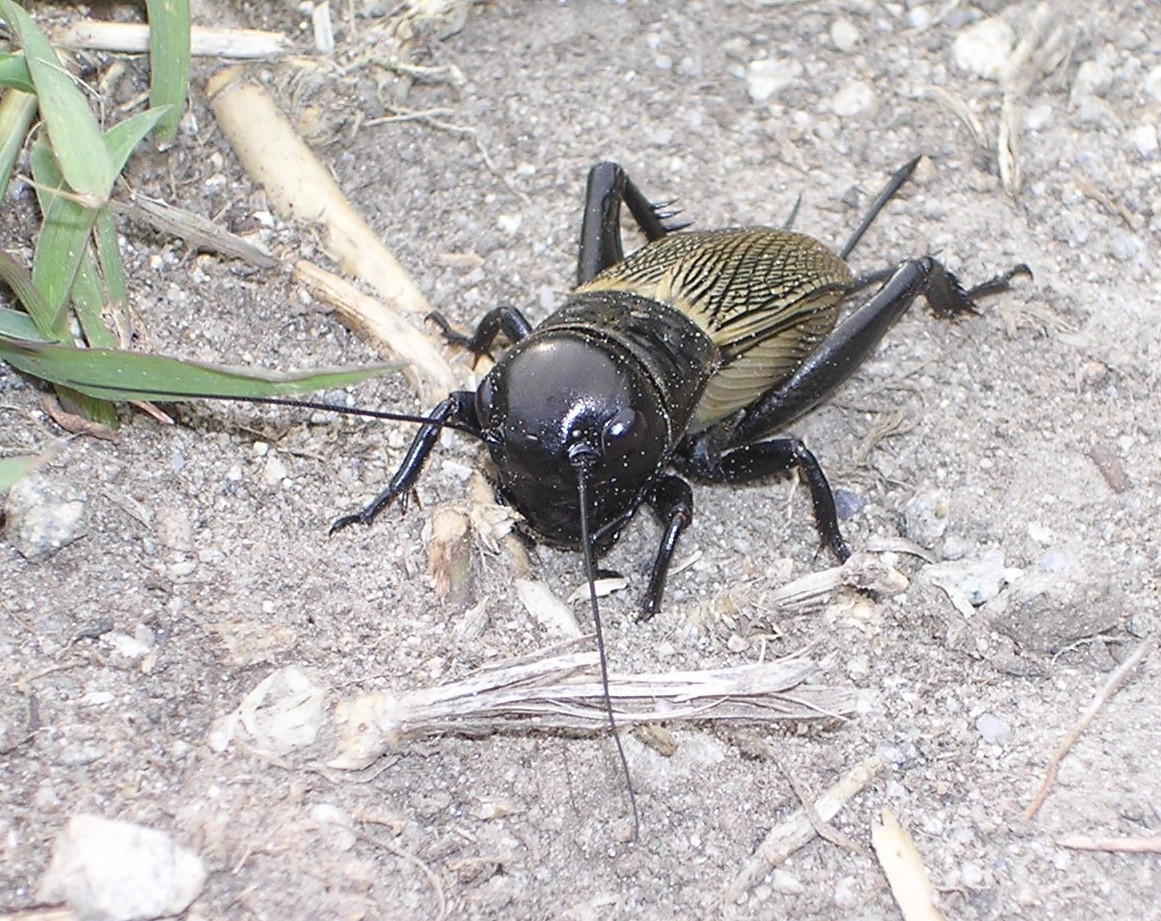
- Female Gryllus campestris
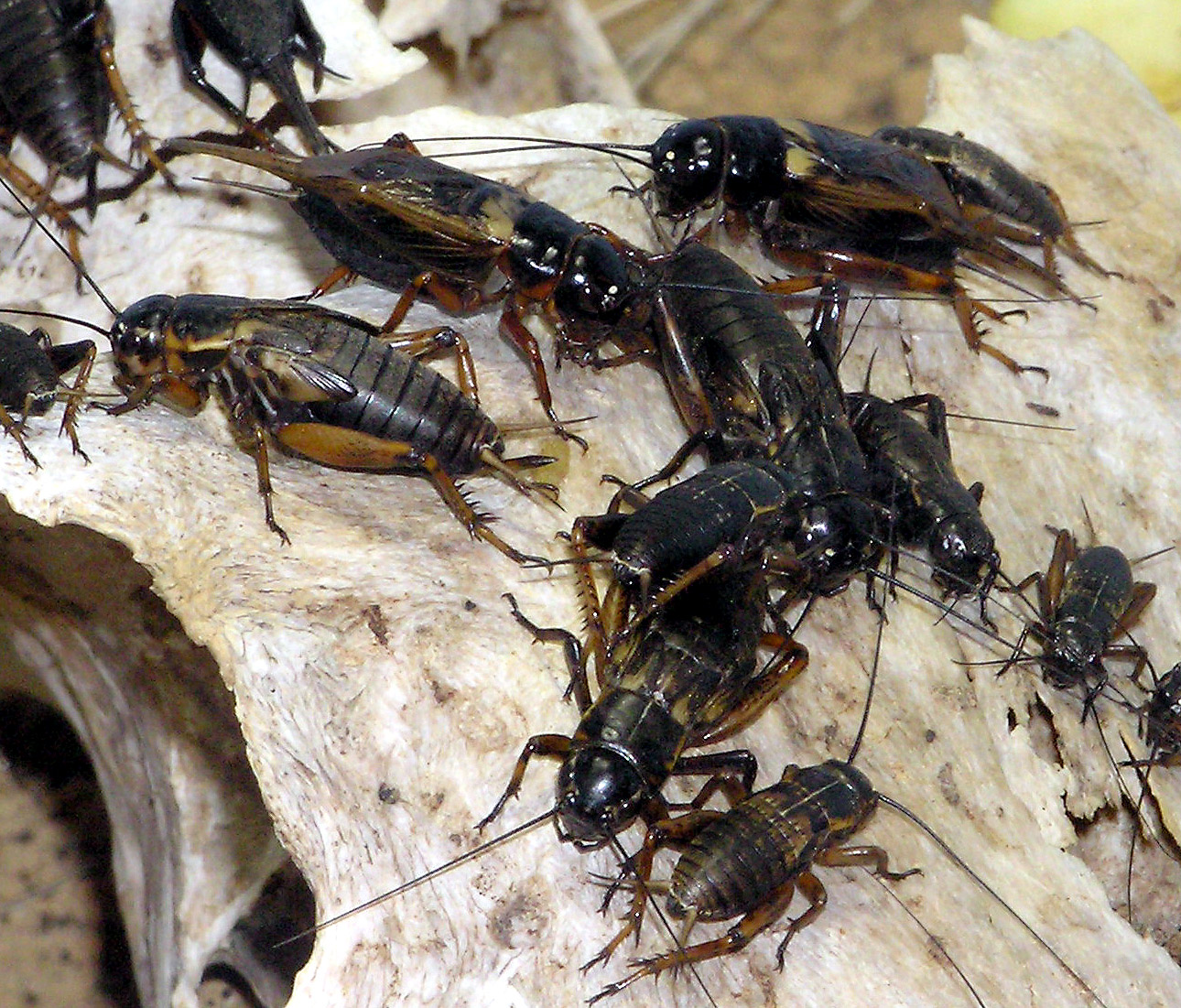
- Gryllus bimaculatus

Scientific classification
- Kingdom: Animalia
- Phylum: Arthropoda
- Class: Insecta
- Order: Orthoptera
- Suborder: Ensifera
- Family: Gryllidae
- Tribe: Gryllini
- Genus: Gryllus; Linnaeus, 1758

Type species
- Gryllus campestris Linnaeus, 1758

Species
- Many, see text

= Gryllus =

Genus of crickets

Gryllus is a genus of field cricket (Orthoptera, Gryllidae, Gryllinae). Members of the genus are typically 15–31 mm long and darkly coloured.

== History ==
Until the mid-1950s, native field crickets in eastern North America were all assigned to a single species, Acheta assimilis. Although regional variation in calling song and life history were noted, no morphological characters could be found to reliably distinguish these variants. Building upon the pioneering work of Fulton, Alexander used male calling song, life history and crosses between putative species to revise the taxonomy of gryllines in the eastern United States, and recognized five species, although at the time they were still classified in the genus Acheta.

== Description ==
Species in this genus often look similar to species from other genera. They can often only be distinguished by the male genitalia. The epithallus typically consists of three lobes, the middle one being longer and more slender than the rest, in American and European species. African species, however, show more variability, making it more difficult to assign species to a genus with the same degree of certainty as there is more overlap with closely related genera.

This female field cricket was seen in Ohio in September.

== Distribution ==
Gryllus is one of the most widespread cricket genera. It is found in Africa, North and South America, Europe and Asia.

== Species ==
The genus contains the following species:

- Gryllus abditus Otte & Peck, 1997 – Galápagos field cricket
- Gryllus abingdoni Otte & Peck, 1997
- Gryllus abnormis Chopard, 1970
- Gryllus alexanderi Otte & Cowper, 2007 – Clarion cricket
- Gryllus amarensis (Chopard, 1921)
- Gryllus ambulator Saussure, 1877
- Gryllus argenteus (Chopard, 1954)
- Gryllus argentinus Saussure, 1874
- Gryllus arijua Otte & Perez-Gelabert, 2009
- Gryllus armatus Scudder, 1902
- Gryllus assimilis (Fabricius, 1775) – Jamaican field cricket
- Gryllus barretti Rehn, 1901
- Gryllus bellicosus Otte & Cade, 1984
- Gryllus bermudensis Caudell, 1903 – Bermuda Beach cricket
- Gryllus bicolor Saussure, 1874
- Gryllus bicornis Linnaeus, 1758
- Gryllus bimaculatus De Geer, 1773 – Two-spotted cricket
- Gryllus braueri (Karny, 1910)
- Gryllus brevecaudatus (Chopard, 1961)
- Gryllus brevicaudus Weissman, Rentz, Alexander & Loher, 1980 – Short-tailed field cricket
- Gryllus brevicornis Linnaeus, 1763
- Gryllus bryanti Morse, 1905
- Gryllus campestris Linnaeus, 1758 – European field cricket
- Gryllus capitatus Saussure, 1874
- Gryllus carvalhoi (Chopard, 1961)
- Gryllus cayensis Walker, 2001 – Keys wood cricket
- Gryllus chaldeus (Uvarov, 1922)
- Gryllus chappuisi (Chopard, 1938)
- Gryllus chichimecus Saussure, 1897
- Gryllus chisosensis Weissman & Gray, 2019 – Chisos mountain cricket
- Gryllus cohni Weissman, Rentz, Alexander & Loher, 1980 – Irregular-trilling field cricket
- Gryllus comptus Walker, 1869
- Gryllus conradti (Bolivar, 1910)
- Gryllus contingens Walker, 1869
- Gryllus darwini Otte & Peck, 1997
- Gryllus debilis Walker, 1871
- Gryllus firmus Scudder, 1902 – Sand field cricket
- Gryllus flavescens Houttuyn
- Gryllus fuchsi Handlirsch, 1907
- Gryllus fultoni (Alexander, 1957) – Southern wood cricket
- Gryllus fulvipennis Blanchard, 1854 – Chilean field cricket
- Gryllus galapageius Scudder, 1893
- Gryllus genovesa Otte & Peck, 1997
- Gryllus gonglyodes Linnaeus, 1758
- Gryllus insularis Scudder, 1876 – Guadalupe Island field cricket
- Gryllus integer Scudder, 1901 – Western trilling cricket
- Gryllus isabela Otte & Peck, 1997
- Gryllus jallae Giglio-Tos, 1907
- Gryllus jamaicensis Walker, 2009
- Gryllus javanus Linnaeus, 1763
- Gryllus kapushi Otte, 1987
- Gryllus krugeri Otte, Toms & Cade, 1988
- Gryllus leei Weissman & Gray, 2019 – Utah lava cricket
- Gryllus lightfooti Weissman & Gray, 2019 – Arboreal desert field cricket
- Gryllus lineaticeps Stål, 1861 – Variable field cricket
- Gryllus lineiceps Zeuner, 1939
- Gryllus locorojo Weissman & Gray, 2012 – Crazy red field cricket
- Gryllus longicercus Weissman & Gray, 2019 – Long-cercus field cricket
- Gryllus luctuosus (Bolivar, 1910)
- Gryllus lunus Linnaeus, 1763
- Gryllus madagascarensis Walker, 1869
- Gryllus makhosica Weissman & Gray, 2019
- Gryllus mandevillus Otte & Perez-Gelabert, 2009
- Gryllus marchena Otte & Peck, 1997
- Gryllus maunus Otte, Toms & Cade, 1988
- Gryllus maximus (Uvarov, 1952)
- Gryllus meruensis Sjöstedt, 1909
- Gryllus miopteryx Saussure, 1877
- Gryllus montis Weissman & Gray, 2019 – Mountain wood cricket
- Gryllus morbillosus Linnaeus, 1758
- Gryllus multipulsator Weissman, 2009 – Long-chirp field cricket
- Gryllus mundus Walker, 1869
- Gryllus mzimba Otte, 1987
- Gryllus namibius Otte & Cade, 1984
- Gryllus navajo Weissman & Gray, 2019 – Painted desert field cricket
- Gryllus nigrohirsutus Alexander, 1991
- Gryllus nyasa Otte & Cade, 1984
- Gryllus obtusus Houttuyn
- Gryllus opacus Chopard, 1927
- Gryllus ovisopis Walker, 1974 – Taciturn wood cricket
- Gryllus parilis Walker, 1869
- Gryllus pennsylvanicus Burmeister, 1838 – Fall field cricket
- Gryllus personatus Uhler, 1864 – Badlands cricket
- Gryllus perspicillatus Linnaeus, 1763
- Gryllus peruviensis Saussure, 1874
- Gryllus pinta Otte & Peck, 1997
- Gryllus planeta Weissman & Gray, 2019 – McDonald Observatory wood cricket
- Gryllus proboscideus Panzer, 1794
- Gryllus providiensis Cadena-Castañeda, 2021
- Gryllus quadrimaculatus Saussure, 1877
- Gryllus regularis Weissman & Gray, 2019 – Southwest regular-trilling cricket
- Gryllus rhinoceros Gorochov, 2001
- Gryllus rixator Otte & Cade, 1984
- Gryllus rubens Scudder, 1902 – Eastern trilling cricket
- Gryllus saxatilis Weissman & Gray, 2019 – Western rock-loving field cricket
- Gryllus scudderianus Saussure, 1874 – Scudder's field cricket
- Gryllus signatus Walker, 1869
- Gryllus sotol Weissman & Gray, 2019 – Organ Mountains field cricket
- Gryllus spec Linnaeus, 1758
- Gryllus spumans Thunberg, 1787
- Gryllus staccato Weissman & Gray, 2019 – Stutter-trilling cricket
- Gryllus subpubescens (Chopard, 1934)
- Gryllus succinctus Linnaeus, 1763
- Gryllus tereti Schaum, 1862
- Gryllus texensis Cade & Otte, 2000 – Texas trilling cricket
- Gryllus thinos Weissman & Gray, 2019 – Texas beach field cricket
- Gryllus transpecos Weissman & Gray, 2019 – Trans-Pecos field cricket
- Gryllus tricolor Linnaeus, 1758
- Gryllus unicolor Linnaeus, 1758
- Gryllus unicornis Linnaeus, 1763
- Gryllus urfaensis Gumussuyu, 1978
- Gryllus veintinueve Weissman & Gray, 2019
- Gryllus veletis (Alexander & Bigelow, 1960) – Spring field cricket
- Gryllus veletisoides Weissman & Gray, 2019 – West coast spring field cricket
- Gryllus vernalis Blatchley, 1920 – Northern wood cricket
- Gryllus vicarius Walker, 1869
- Gryllus vocalis Scudder, 1901 – Vocal field cricket
- Gryllus vociferans Cockerell, 1925
- Gryllus vulcanus Weissman & Gray, 2019 – New Mexico lava field cricket
- Gryllus zaisi Otte, Toms & Cade, 1988
- Gryllus zambezi (Saussure, 1877)
