= Gryllus fultoni =

Scientific classification
- Domain: Eukaryota
- Kingdom: Animalia
- Phylum: Arthropoda
- Class: Insecta
- Order: Orthoptera
- Suborder: Ensifera
- Family: Gryllidae
- Tribe: Gryllini
- Genus: Gryllus
- Species: G. fultoni

Binomial name
- Gryllus fultoni (Alexander, 1957)

Species of cricket

Gryllus fultoni, the southern wood cricket, is a species of cricket in the subfamily Gryllinae. It is found in North America.
