= Roca Partida =

Island in Mexico

Coordinates: 18°59′50″N 112°03′54″W

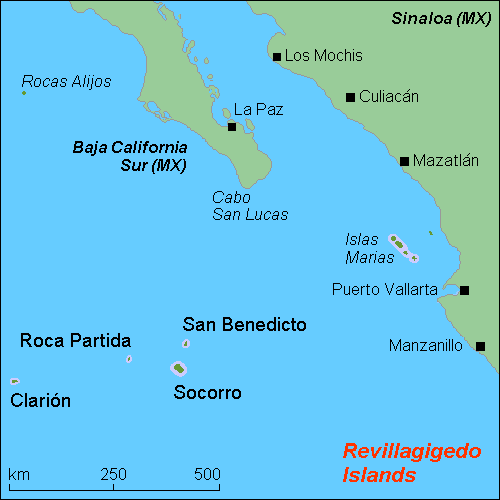
The Revillagigedo Islands.

Roca Partida (English: Split Rock) ranks as the smallest of the four Revillagigedo Islands, part of the Free and Sovereign State of Colima in Mexico. The uninhabited island (Latitude 19° 0'2.53"N, Longitude 112° 4'5.35"W) encompasses an extremely small area. Many divers rank it among the most beautiful dive sites in Mexico. Divers must obtain permits from the Mexican Armed Forces to enter the military zone surrounding the island.

== Geography ==
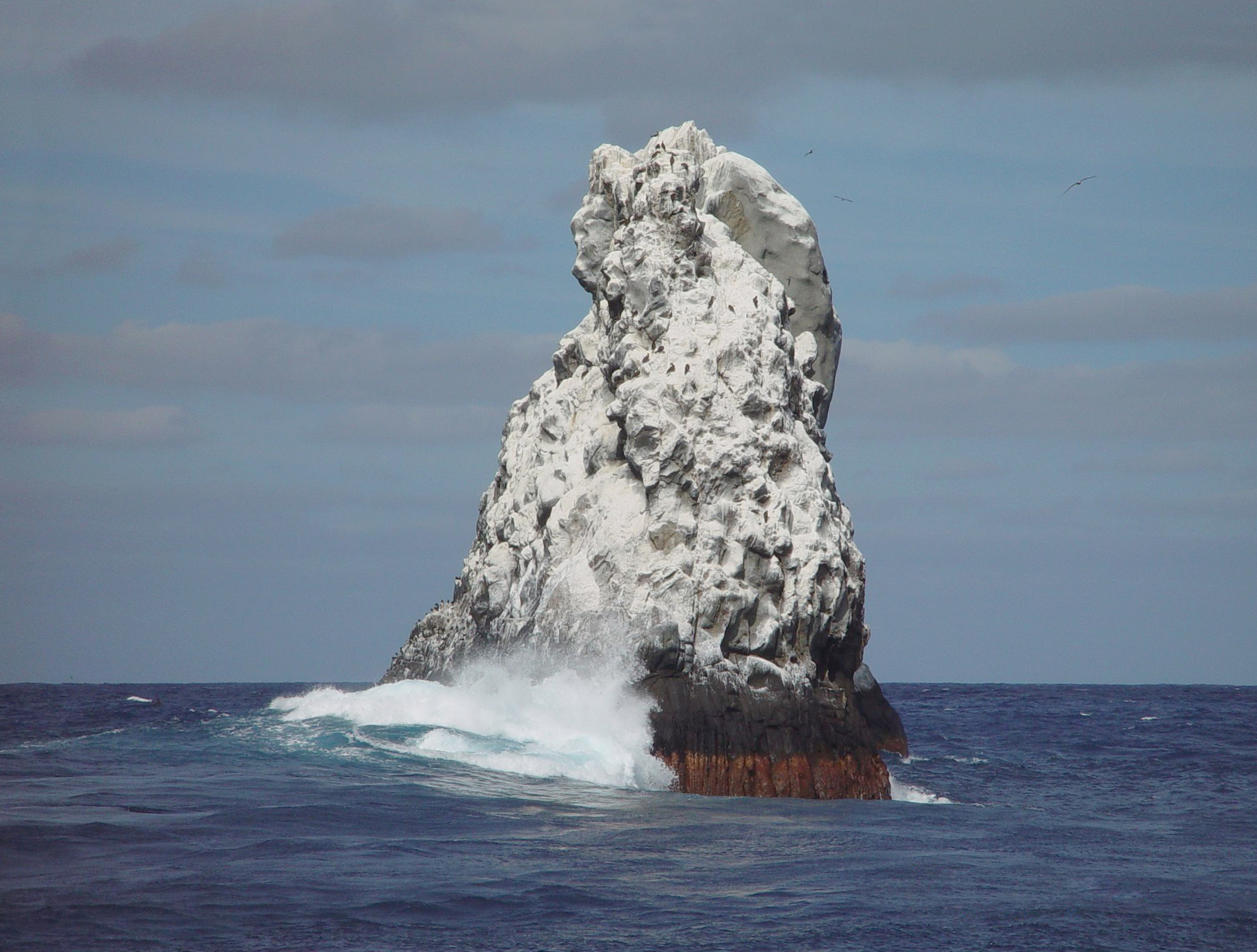
The higher northwestern peak of Roca Partida with the southeastern peak hidden.

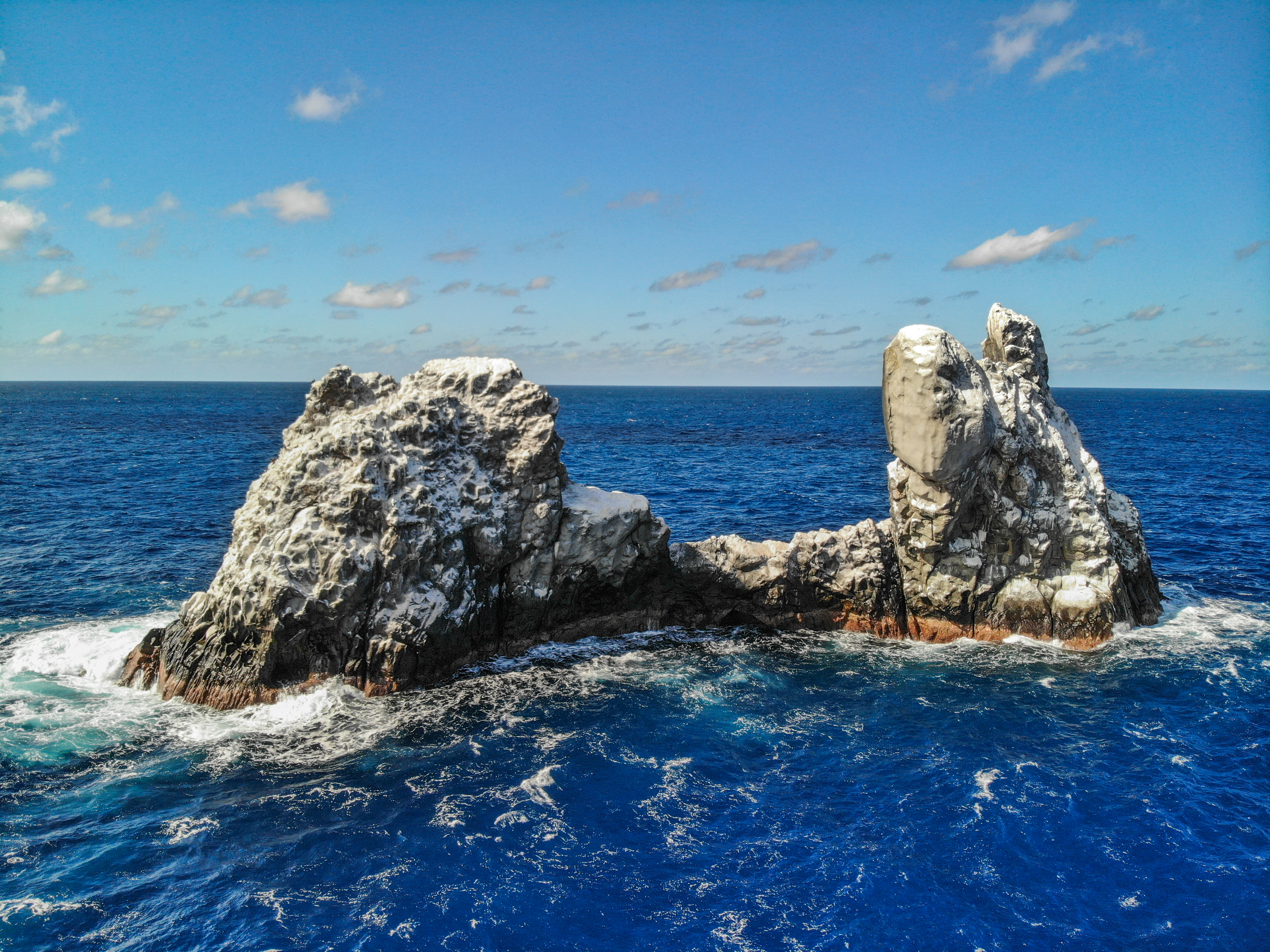
Roca Partida

The four Revillagigedo Islands originated as volcanoes. San Benedicto Island and Socorro Island erupted in 1953 and 1993, respectively. Clarion Island and Roca Partida lack recently known eruptions. Erosion over millennia reduced Roca Partida to a piece of bare rock, devoid of terrestrial vegetation.

Roca Partida, 100 metres (330 ft) long and 8 metres (26 ft) wide, rises into two peaks. A low-lying bare rock area divides the two peaks, hence the name "Split Rock." The two peaks measured 25 metres (82 ft) and 34 metres (112 ft) high in 1953, but the higher peak has apparently lost several meters (feet) since then, as the photographs illustrate.

== Fauna ==
Roca Partida lacks fresh water and supports no land animals. Nevertheless, the waters surrounding the islet teem with marine life. Several species of seabird breed on the rock, including the Nazca booby (Sula granti), which probably ventures little farther to the northeast; the Northeast Pacific brown booby (Sula leucogaster brewsteri); the East Pacific sooty tern (Onychoprion fuscatus crissalis), a doubtfully distinct subspecies; and the East Pacific brown noddy (Anous stolidus ridgwayi).

== History ==
The island's first reported sighting was in November 1542 by the Spanish expedition of Ruy López de Villalobos, who charted it with its present-day name.
