= San Benedicto Island =

Volcanic island in Mexico

San Benedicto
- San Benedicto Island – Landsat Image N-12-15 2000 (1:25,000)

Highest point
- Elevation: c.332 metres (1,089 ft)
- Coordinates: 19°18′16″N 110°48′52″W

Geography
- Location: Revillagigedo Islands, Mexico

Geology
- Mountain type: Cinder cones
- Last eruption: 1953

San Benedicto, formerly Isla de los Inocentes and Isla Anublada, is an uninhabited island, and third largest island of the Revillagigedo Islands, Mexico, located in the Pacific Ocean.

It is 4.8 km by 2.4 km in size, with an area 10 km². It is of volcanic origin. It has two prominent peaks. The tallest peak, Bárcena, rises to a height of 332 metres (1,089 feet) near the southern part of the island. It forms a typical volcanic crater. It is located between the remains of two older craters, Herrera in the middle of the island and the Montículo Cinerítico ("Ash Heap") in the southwest. There is no permanent source of freshwater.

== History ==
The first recorded sighting of San Benedicto was by the Spanish expedition of Hernando de Grijalva on 28 December 1533 that charted it as Isla de los Inocentes due to this day being the festivity of the Holy Innocents. In November 1542, it was sighted again by the expedition of Ruy López de Villalobos that incorrectly identified it with the Santo Tomás of Grijalva (present day Socorro Island).

== 1952/53 volcanic eruption ==
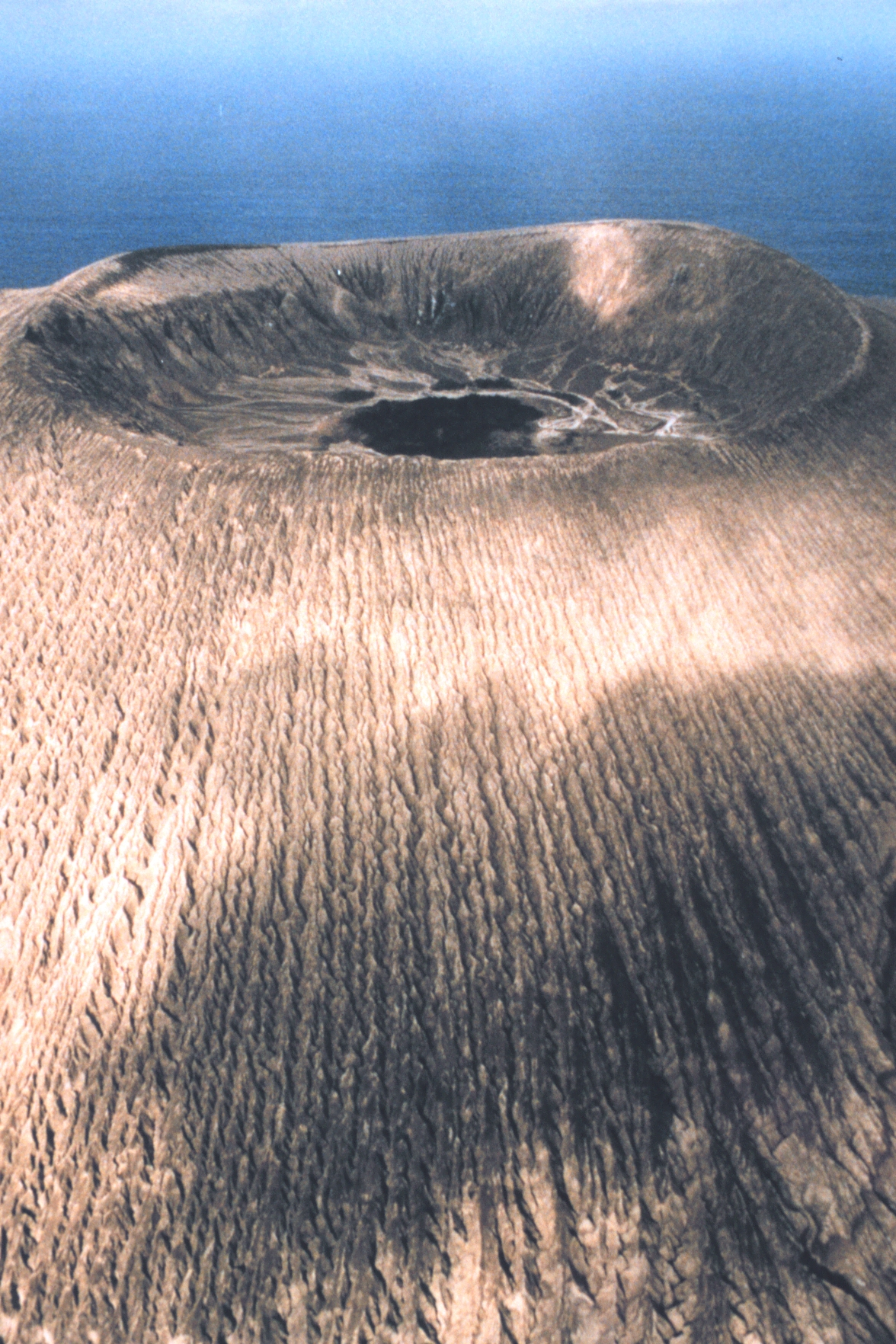
Bárcena crater

Bárcena's only historic eruption began around 8:30 AM on August 1, 1952, from the El Boquerón vent. In a severe Vulcanian eruption of magnitude 3 on the Volcanic Explosivity Index scale, pyroclastic flows rolled over the island. Soon the entire island was covered in ash and pumice up to 3 m (10 ft) high. Ejecta filled the valley between Herrera crater and Montículo Cinerítico, and by August 14 had formed a cone some 300 m (over 1000 ft) high. After some months with little activity, a second series of eruptions began on November 1, 1952. On December 8, the magma broke through the cone's southeastern base and started to flow into the sea. This continued to about February 24, 1953. By March 9, 1953, most activity had subsided, except fumaroles in the crater and at the rift in its base; the lava was hard but still retained much heat. By late 1953, the volcano was dormant again.

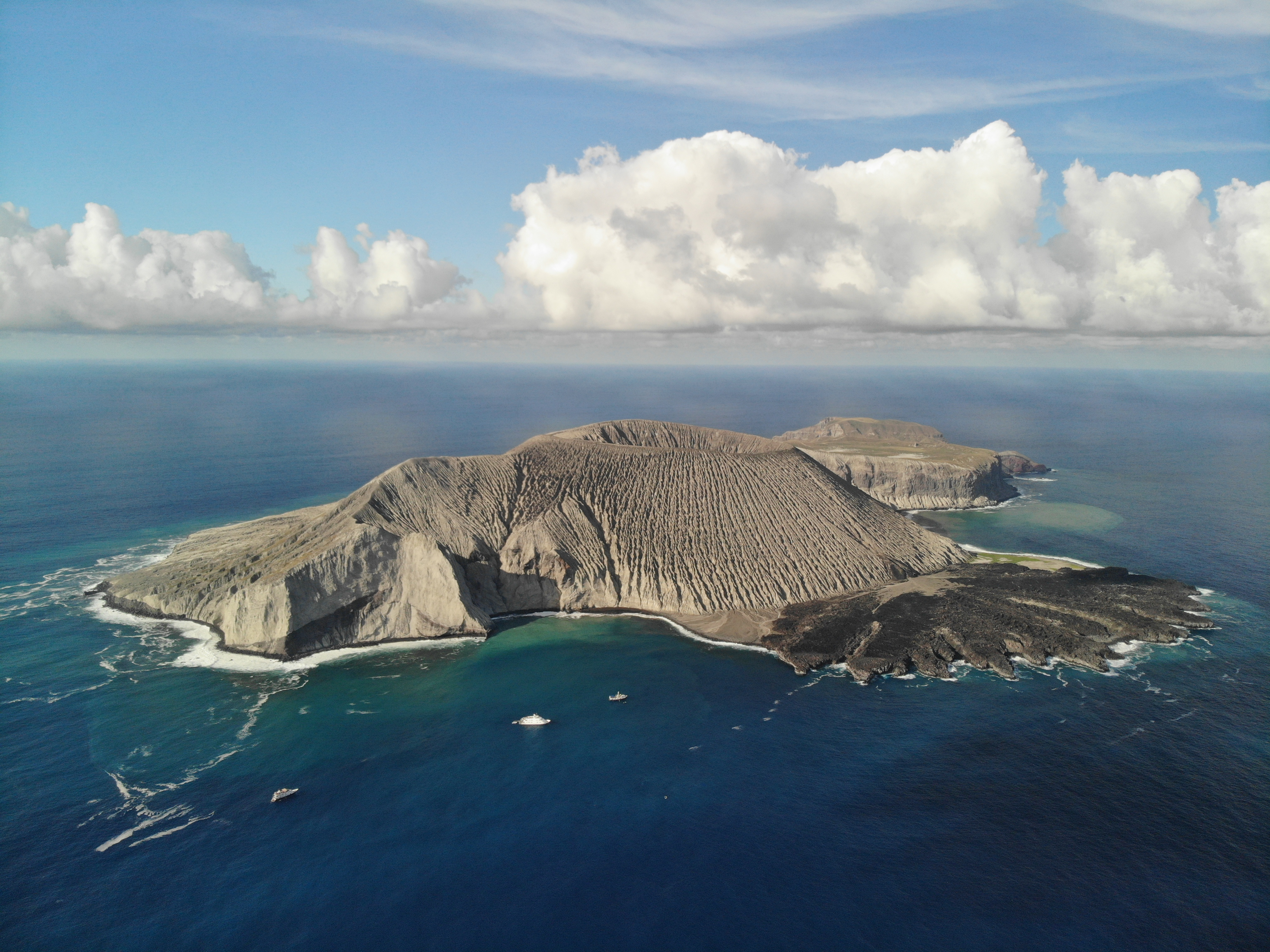
San Benedicto Island

== Ecology ==
The eruption wiped out – at least temporarily – all flora and terrestrial fauna of San Benedicto. The fauna included the endemic San Benedicto rock wren which became extinct around 9 AM on August 1. It is unusual for an extinction to be recorded with such precision, and in this case it was only possible because observers were offshore, documenting how the island was blasted with ejecta.

However, once the volcanic activity had died down by the spring of 1953, seabirds returned to the island for the breeding season. They roosted only north of Herrera crater, where the ash cover had already begun to erode away. A few Johngarthia planata land crabs were present also, having either managed to survive the eruption or, more probably, recolonized the island; their larvae live in the ocean. Still, the island was devoid of plant life.

By late 1953, rain had removed the ash and pumice deposits in the steeper places of northern San Benedicto. At least half the previously recorded plant taxa were again present. Numerous seabirds were found breeding, most north of Herrera but a colony of blue-footed boobies was present in the ditch between Herrera and Barcena.

=== Fauna ===
The vertebrate fauna of San Benedicto is nowadays composed entirely of seabirds. It appears that the Revillagigedo population of western ravens also bred on San Benedicto before the 1952 eruption, but any such population was wiped out and ravens are not found – except maybe as very rare vagrants – on San Benedicto today.

Its position on the northeastern edge of the archipelago makes San Benedicto the north(east)ernmost location where several seabirds of the tropical Eastern Pacific come to breed. Taxa breeding on San Benedicto are:

- Wedge-tailed shearwater, Puffinus pacificus (or Ardenna pacifica) – easternmost breeding site
- Western red-billed tropicbird, Phaethon aethereus mesonauta – possibly northernmost breeding site
- Northern blue-footed booby, Sula nebouxii nebouxii – possibly northernmost breeding site
- Nazca booby, Sula granti – possibly northeasternmost breeding site
- East Pacific red-footed booby, Sula sula websteri – northernmost breeding site of this doubtfully distinct subspecies
- Northeast Pacific brown booby, Sula leucogaster brewsteri – northernmost breeding site
- East Pacific great frigatebird, Fregata minor ridgwayi – northernmost breeding site of this doubtfully distinct subspecies

The nearly extinct Townsend's shearwater (Puffinus auricularis) does not seem to breed on San Benedicto, but can sometimes be seen feeding offshore. Given that there are no invasive species on San Benedicto and also no predators apart from the frigatebirds, the island might be highly suitable for establishing a new colony. Indeed, it bred here before the 1952 eruption; shearwaters are highly conservative in choosing their breeding locations, which explains why San Benedicto has not yet been recolonized.

Vagrants of other species, such as brown pelicans, red-tailed hawks, ospreys, barn swallows and bay-breasted warblers may occasionally visit the island but ultimately move on or perish, finding San Benedicto still too barren to support a resident population. Migrant waders, such as Hudsonian curlews and wandering tattlers, use San Benedicto for brief stopovers more regularly.

=== Flora ===
A mere 10 plant taxa have been recorded from San Benedicto, containing mainly herbs and grasses, with the occasional subshrubs and vines. It does not appear that any became extinct due to the 1952 eruption. The local plant life contains several Revillagigedo endemics shared with Clarión: Bulbostylis nesiotica, Cyperus duripes and Perityle socorrosensis. The taxonomic status of the local Euphorbia anthonyi is not fully resolved. Other plants on San Benedicto are Aristolochia islandica, Cenchrus myosuroides, Eragrostis diversiflora, Erigeron crenatus, Ipomoea pes-caprae subsp. brasiliensis and Teucrium townsendii.

== Visiting information ==
San Benedicto Island is a popular scuba diving destination known for underwater encounters with dolphins, sharks, giant manta rays and other pelagics. An area called "The Boiler" is where divers commonly interact with the rays. Divers have also spotted tiger sharks, Galápagos sharks, silky sharks, and humpback whales here. Since there is no public airport on the island, divers visit here aboard dive vessels. The most popular months to visit are between November and July when the weather and seas are calmer.
