= Species affected by poaching =

Many species are affected by poaching, including illegal hunting, fishing and capturing of wild animals, and, in a recent usage, the illegal harvesting of wild plant species. The article provides an overview of species currently endangered or impaired by poaching in the Americas, sub-Saharan Africa, and South-East Asia.

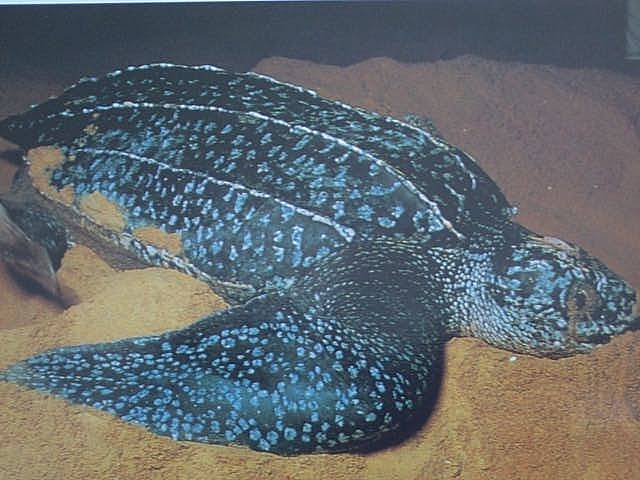
The leatherback sea turtle is globally threatened due to poaching for eggs, meat and oil.

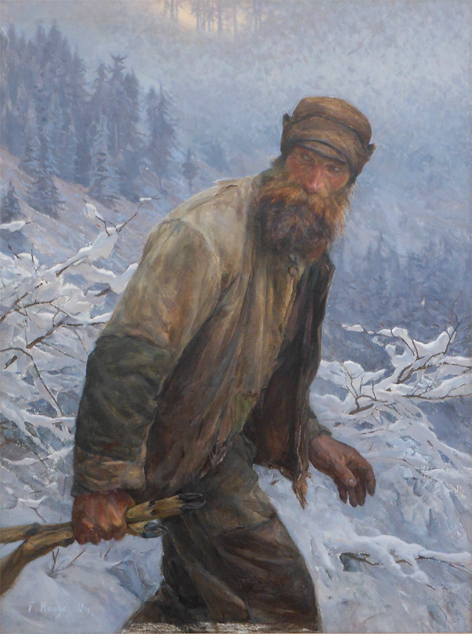
Poacher, painting of Frédéric Rouge (1867-1950)

== In North America ==
In the early 1990s, crimes against wildlife were rampant in certain parts of the United States, and poaching equaled or exceeded the number of animals hunted legally. As trophy hunting became popular, poaching activity, in particular commercial poaching, increased in the Western states. Commercial poachers kill grizzly bears, moose, bighorn sheep, elk, mountain lions, eagles and snakes. Domestic bear species such as American black bear are slaughtered for their body parts that are used for exotic foods, medicinal purposes and as aphrodisiacs. Walrus is poached for the ivory of their tusks, white-tailed deer for antlers and meat, bobcats for their pelts, and bighorn sheep as trophies. Elk antlers and seal penises are used for medicinal purposes. Paddlefish and sturgeon eggs are sold as caviar. Redfish, shellfish, trout and salmon are poached for meat, snakes for their skins, bald eagles for their feathers used in Southwestern art. Protected ridge-nosed rattlesnakes, rock rattlesnakes, twin-spotted rattlesnakes, Sonoran Mountain kingsnakes and massasaugas are illegally collected in Arizona.

Millions of protected plants are illegally collected each year. Plant poaching spans the illegal harvest of ginseng roots, rare orchids, endangered cacti, pitcher plants and Venus flytraps, and tree species such as aspen and western red cedar. Commercial poachers collect hundreds of wildflowers in the Great Smoky Mountains National Park every year, in particular American ginseng, orchids and trilliums. Rangers seized about 11,000 illegally harvested ginseng roots in the Great Smoky Mountains National Park between 1994 and 2004, and attribute ginseng poaching to the illegal domestic and international black market. It is estimated that fresh roots of wild ginseng are worth $65–100 per pound, and dried roots about $260–365 per pound. Ginseng is also harvested illegally in Wisconsin. Goldenseal is suspected to be illegally collected in the Hoosier National Forest.

In 2007, it was estimated that parrot trappers capture about 65,000–78,500 wild parrots each year in Mexico, mainly by setting nets or by collecting nestlings from tree cavities. About 50,000–60,000, more than 75%, die before reaching customers. Between 2003 and 2006, Mexican wildlife officials did not issue permits for parrot trapping as legal permits provided cover for the illegal trade of poached parrots. Illegal trapping of wild parrots affects most of the 22 parrot species native to Mexico including:

- Amazona: white-fronted amazon, red-crowned amazon, Yucatan amazon, lilac-crowned amazon, mealy amazon, red-lored amazon, yellow-headed amazon, yellow-naped amazon;
- Ara: military macaw, scarlet macaw;
- Aratinga: green parakeet, Pacific parakeet, olive-throated parakeet, orange-fronted parakeet
- Mexican parrotlet, white-crowned parrot, orange-chinned parakeet, barred parakeet, thick-billed parrot.

Commercial poaching of neotropical river otters for their fur is a continuous threat for Mexican populations. Bahía Magdalena is a hot spot for mortality of black, loggerhead, olive ridley and hawksbill sea turtles. More than 600 sea turtles are estimated to be killed yearly inside the bay, mostly for consumption of their meat, which is considered a delicacy in Mexico.

== In Central America ==
The solitary eagle is seriously threatened by poaching. Illegal hunting of Baird's tapirs is a major threat for populations in Costa Rica, Belize and Panama. In Panama, mammal species hunted by poachers comprise white-tailed deer, red brocket deer, collared peccary, agouti and coati. Geoffroy's tamarin, howler monkey, white-faced capuchin and common opossum are captured less often.

West Indian manatees were illegally hunted in the Port Honduras area in Belize at least until the end of the 1990s. Poachers were suspected to come from Guatemala and Honduras. Manatees were killed for meat, and their bones used for carving trinket and other souvenirs sold in local markets in the Yucatán Peninsula. In 2002, it was estimated that about 40 manatees are killed annually along the eastern Nicaraguan coast and in inland wetlands by poachers and incidental drowning in fishing nets.

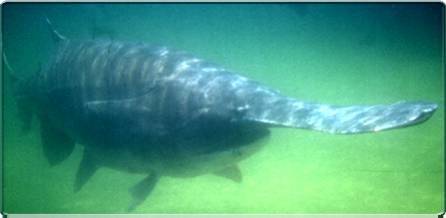
The American paddlefish is poached for its eggs

Other species poached in Central American countries and in the Dominican Republic for being traded alive include Geoffroy's spider monkey, margay, ocelot, great horned guan, crested guan, great curassow, ocellated turkey, great green macaw, Hispaniolan amazon, Hispaniolan parakeet, red-billed toucan, chestnut-mandible toucan, raptors, rosy boa, rattlesnake, Galápagos tortoise, beaded lizard, green iguana, poison dart frogs and freshwater turtles. Snakes, spectacled caiman, Morelet's and American crocodiles are killed for their skins. Black iguana, mangrove cockle and queen conch are poached for consuming their meat.

== In South America ==
In Colombia the endangered helmeted curassow and the near threatened wattled guan are poached for their meat and eggs. The jacutinga population in the Brazilian Atlantic rainforest is threatened by illegal hunting. The global decline of leatherback sea turtle populations is attributed to the illegal harvest of eggs and killing of egg-bearing females at nesting sites along Central and South American coastlines of the Caribbean Sea and on the Malaysian Terengganu beach.

== In Sub-Saharan Africa ==
The population of the critically endangered Black rhinoceros, inhabiting most of Sub-Saharan Africa, was estimated to have been about 100,000 in 1960 and has now dramatically decreased to only about 4,000, with poaching being attributed as one of the causes of this decline in population. The commercial poaching of white and black rhinoceros escalated in South Africa from 12 rhinos killed in 2004 to 946 rhinos killed in 2013. Rhino horns have increasingly been acquired by Vietnamese people. African elephants, lions, greater kudus, elands, impala, duiker, reedbuck, bushbuck, bushpig, common warthog, chacma baboon and greater cane rat are illegally hunted for the bushmeat trade in Mozambique.

African elephants are being poached for their ivory tusks – the heaviest teeth of any animal alive. In October 2013 poachers were reported in the press to have poisoned more than 300 African elephants in Hwange National Park in Zimbabwe. This UK Telegraph report (republished widely by other newspapers) was proven to be exaggerated, with a maximum total of 120 elephants determined by independent sources to be dead in this incident. Even so, conservationists have called this the deadliest massacre of animals in Southern Africa in 25 years. African elephants continue to remain a high target for poachers and some researchers have estimated that African elephants may be extinct in 25–50 years in the wild. African elephants have experienced a 60-70% decline in population in two decades, 1979–2002. In 2012 alone, 13,607 elephants were poached in Central Africa, and 8,515 elephants were poached in East Africa.

Illegal poaching for African elephants has increased noticeably in 2008 and correlates with an increase in price for local black market ivory and with increased findings of illegal ivory headed to China. There is a probable species reduction of ~3% in 2011 alone. Estimates of over 25,000 to 35,000 African elephants were killed for their tusks in 2012. Despite ivory trade bans in 1989, elephant numbers continue to decline in Africa. Finding and monitoring the origin of illegal ivory found could help efforts to curb and suppress poaching of African elephants. In Tanzania, 60% of the elephant population has been killed since 2010 and now number fewer than 44,000 individuals. In Mozambique, 48% of the country's elephants were killed in the same period. Local people kill elephants for cash, but penalties are often negligible. In central Africa, militias and terrorist groups also poach elephants, often outside their home countries. They hide inside protected areas and kill park rangers who get in their way. A 2014 survey estimated that at least 100,000 elephants were killed for their ivory between 2010 and 2012. According to the survey, even if poaching stopped now, it might take more than 90 years for forest elephants to match their 2002 population."

== In South-East Asia ==
There are more than 400 endangered faunal species in the Philippines, all of which are illegal to hunt.
