= Game law =

Regulations for hunting

Game laws are statutes which regulate the right to pursue and hunt certain kinds of wild animals (games or quarries) and fish (although the latter often comes under the jurisdiction of fisheries law). The scope of game laws can include the following:

- Restricting the days to harvest fish or game (i.e. open and closed seasons);
- Restricting the number of animals per person;
- Restricting species, sex and age of animals allowed to be harvested;
- Restricting the region where hunting is allowed to take place, and;
- Limiting the weapons, gears and techniques that can be used.

Hunters, fishermen and lawmakers generally agree that the purposes of such laws is to balance the needs for preservation and harvest and to manage both environment and populations of game and fish. Game laws can provide a legal structure to collect license fees and other money which is used to fund conservation efforts as well as to obtain harvest information used in wildlife management practice.

== History ==
=== Britain ===
In Britain the game laws have developed out of the forest laws, which in the time of the Norman kings were very oppressive. In England, under William the Conqueror, it was as great a crime to kill one of the king's deer as to kill one of his subjects.

The formalisation of forest law in Scotland is usually attributed to David I (1124 - 1153), though Richard Oram suggests that codification is more likely to have taken place during the reign of his grandson William the Lion (1165 - 1214) or of his great-grandson Alexander II (1214 - 1249). Keepers, appointed to protect the hunting interest in royal forests, are recorded from the reign of King William.

A certain rank and standing, or the possession of a certain amount of property, were for a long time necessary to confer upon anyone the right of pursuing and killing game. The first game qualification law was instituted in 1389 under Richard II. It stated that anyone without lands or tenements of 40 shillings a year, or clergyman under £10 a year, were forbidden from keeping greyhounds, hounds, other hunting dogs, and any other hunting equipment. The preamble to the Act states that commoners tended to poach on Holy Days when their superiors attended church and that these gatherings encouraged social unrest.

The game qualifications were further elaborated under James I and then Charles II. These new laws heightened property value thresholds for keeping game hunting animals and instruments. It also introduced qualifications specifically relating to deer, rabbits, pheasants, and partridges.

Game laws such as the British Night Poaching Act 1828 and Game Act 1831, both still in force in modified form, and still more their predecessors, such as the notorious Black Act 1723, enacted savage penalties for poaching. But the Game Act installed under William IV did greatly mitigate the game laws: the necessity for any qualification except the possession of a game certificate was abolished, and the right was given to anyone to kill game on their own land, or on that of another with permission.

=== United States ===
During the early history of the United States, colonists who were concerned about the decline in populations of game animals struggled to find effective ways to protect them. Probably the earliest law on the subject was adopted by the town of Portsmouth, Rhode Island, in 1646, which closed the hunting season for deer "from the first of May till the first of November; and if any shall shoot a deere within that time he shall forfeit five pounds." Several other colonies passed similar ordinances before 1720. However, there was no effective enforcement of these early restrictions. Much later, a law passed in Massachusetts in 1817, established closed seasons for certain animals shot as game. Eventually wild game, whether of forest, field or stream, became perhaps better protected than in any other country in the world. All states passed game laws of their own. Nearly every state instituted a game and fish commission and numerous game wardens.

A national game law, known as the Lacey Act, passed by the U.S. Congress in 1900, gave to the United States Department of Agriculture certain powers, by which, among other provisions, no importation of wild animals could be made without a permit from Secretary of Agriculture. Many important additions and amendments to the Federal laws were passed during the succeeding 10 years, all tending to protect game and game birds in their natural state without interfering with the importation of birds' eggs or animals for breeding purposes. During 1910 there was an increase in these importations.

Congress then came to adopt the theory that the migratory birds, being in most cases mere travelers across states, were not local residents nor state property, but belonged to the people at large; and if they were to be saved to the people the national authority must intervene. Therefore, Congress passed (4 March 1913) the Weeks–McLean Act, the gist of which was:

“All wild geese, wild swans, brant, wild ducks, plover, woodcock, rail, wild pigeons, and all other migratory game and insectivorous birds which in their northern and southern migrations pass through or do not remain permanently the entire year within the borders of any State or Territory, shall hereafter be deemed to be within the custody and protection of the Government of the United States, and shall not be destroyed or taken contrary to regulations hereinafter provided therefor. The Department of Agriculture is hereby authorized and directed to adopt suitable regulations to give effect to the previous paragraph.”

The most important effect of this law — and a very far-reaching benefit — was the stoppage of the shooting of wild fowl in the spring, which was especially prevalent in the Mississippi River Valley. Because of a constitutional weakness, this act was later replaced by the Migratory Bird Treaty Act of 1918.

== See also ==
- Common law
- Conservation movement
- Enclosure
- Environmental law
- Federal Duck Stamp
- Fisheries management
- Fishing
- Fox hunting legislation
- Game Act 1831
- Hunting
- Hunting license
- Illegal, unreported and unregulated fishing
- Opposition to hunting
- Poaching
  - Species affected by poaching
- Wildlife management
