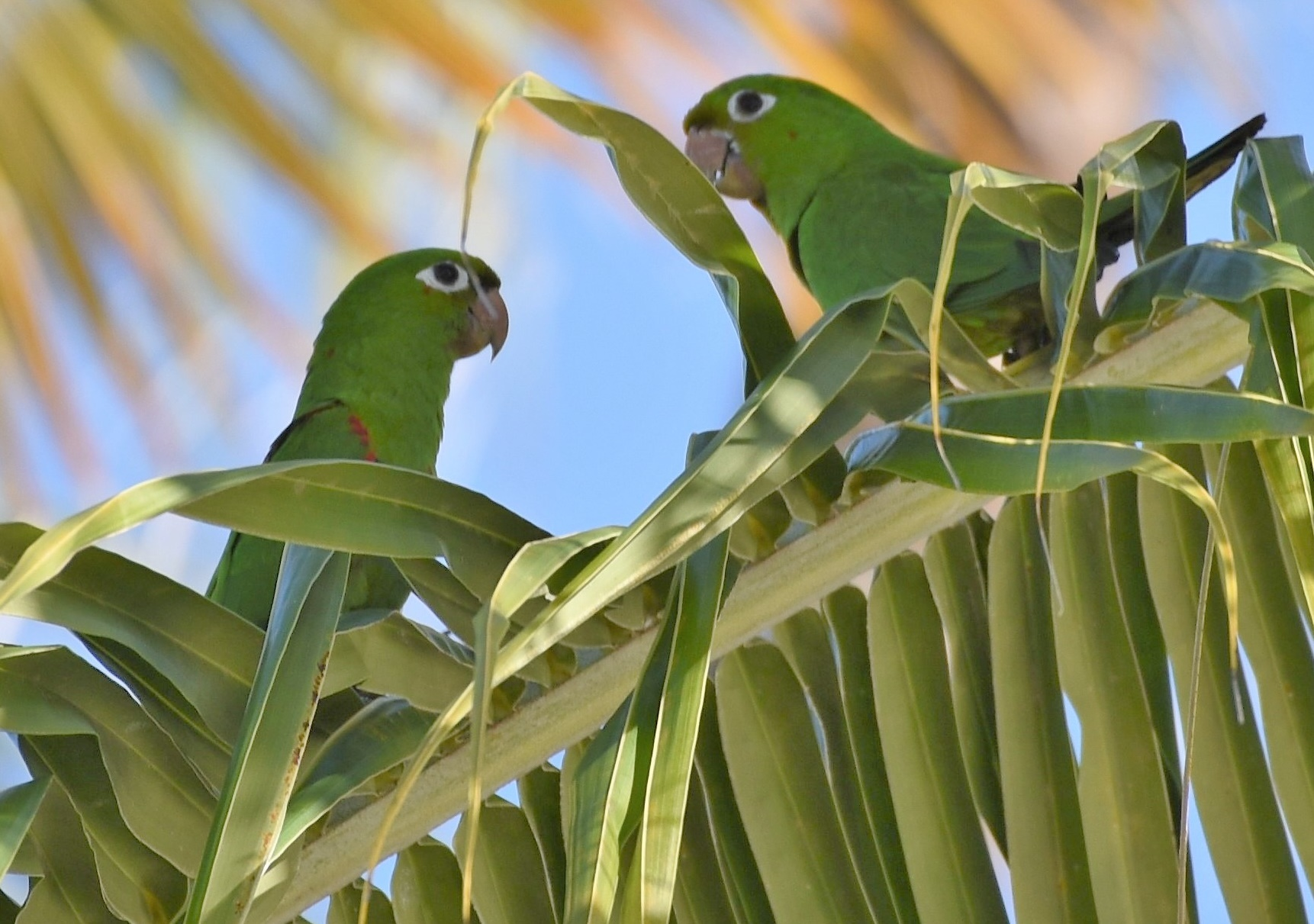

Conservation status
- Vulnerable (IUCN 3.1)
- CITES Appendix II (CITES)

Scientific classification
- Kingdom: Animalia
- Phylum: Chordata
- Class: Aves
- Order: Psittaciformes
- Family: Psittacidae
- Genus: Psittacara
- Species: P. chloropterus

Binomial name
- Psittacara chloropterus Souancé, 1856

= Hispaniolan parakeet =

Species of bird

The Hispaniolan parakeet (Psittacara chloropterus) is a Vulnerable species of bird in subfamily Arinae of the family Psittacidae, the African and New World parrots. It is endemic to the island of Hispaniola which is shared by the Dominican Republic and Haiti. In the former country it is called "perico" and in the latter "perruche".

== Taxonomy and systematics ==
The Hispaniolan parakeet was for a time placed in the genus Aratinga but from about 2013 has been in its present genus Psittacara. The International Ornithological Committee, the American Ornithological Society, and the Clements taxonomy consider the Hispaniolan parakeet to be monotypic. They previously treated what is now the Puerto Rican parakeet (P. maugei) as a subspecies. BirdLife International's Handbook of the Birds of the World retains that former treatment (the Puerto Rican parakeet is now extinct; it had occurred on Mona Island and probably on the main island of Puerto Rico).

The Hispaniolan parakeet has at times been suggested to be conspecific with the white-eyed parakeet (P. leucophthalmus); it and the Cuban parakeet (P. euops) form a superspecies.

== Description ==
The Hispaniolan parakeet is 30 to 33 cm (12 to 13 in) long and weighs 144 to 147 g (5.1 to 5.2 oz). The sexes are alike. Adults are mostly green that is more yellowish on their underparts. Some have a few red flecks on their head. The bend and edge of their wing and their outermost underwing coverts are red. The undersides of their flight feathers and tail are dull yellowish. Their eye is surrounded by bare white skin. Immature birds have little or no red on the wing.

== Distribution and habitat ==
The Hispaniolan parakeet formerly ranged across most of the island of Hispaniola. As of 2020 it is known in the Dominican Republic mostly from the Cordillera Central, Sierra de Bahoruco, and a few urban centers. It is very rare in Haiti, where in the early 2000s it was found in the Chaîne de la Selle and Massif de la Hotte with scattered records elsewhere. The species was introduced to Puerto Rico and Guadeloupe. There are no eBird records from the former island and very few from the latter.

The Hispaniolan parakeet inhabits a wide variety of landscapes including lowland and montane forest, savanna, open woodlands, secondary forest, croplands, and urban centers such as Santo Domingo. It is most common in humid montane forest. In elevation it ranges from sea level to 3,000 m (9,800 ft).

== Behavior ==
=== Movement ===
The Hispaniolan parakeet is not migratory.

=== Feeding ===
The Hispaniolan parakeet's diet has not been fully described. It is known to feed on fig (Ficus) fruits and reported to feed on fruits, seeds, and flowers of a variety of other plants and trees. It has also been reported as a significant pest on maize (Zea mays) crops.

=== Breeding ===
The Hispaniolan parakeet nests in cavities in trees or arboreal termitaria. Almost nothing is known about its breeding biology in the wild. In captivity it lays a clutch of three or four eggs, with an incubation period of 20 to 23 days and about eight weeks to fledging.

=== Vocalization ===
The Hispaniolan parakeet makes a "kree" call "with a grating noisy sound quality" both in flight and when perched.

== Status ==
The IUCN originally assessed the Hispaniolan parakeet as Near Threatened but since 1994 has rated it as Vulnerable. It has a small and fragmented range and its estimated population of 1500 to 7000 mature individuals is believed to be decreasing. Continuing habitat loss and persecution as a crop pest are the principal threats. Illegal trapping for the domestic and export cage bird trade has also contributed to its decline.
