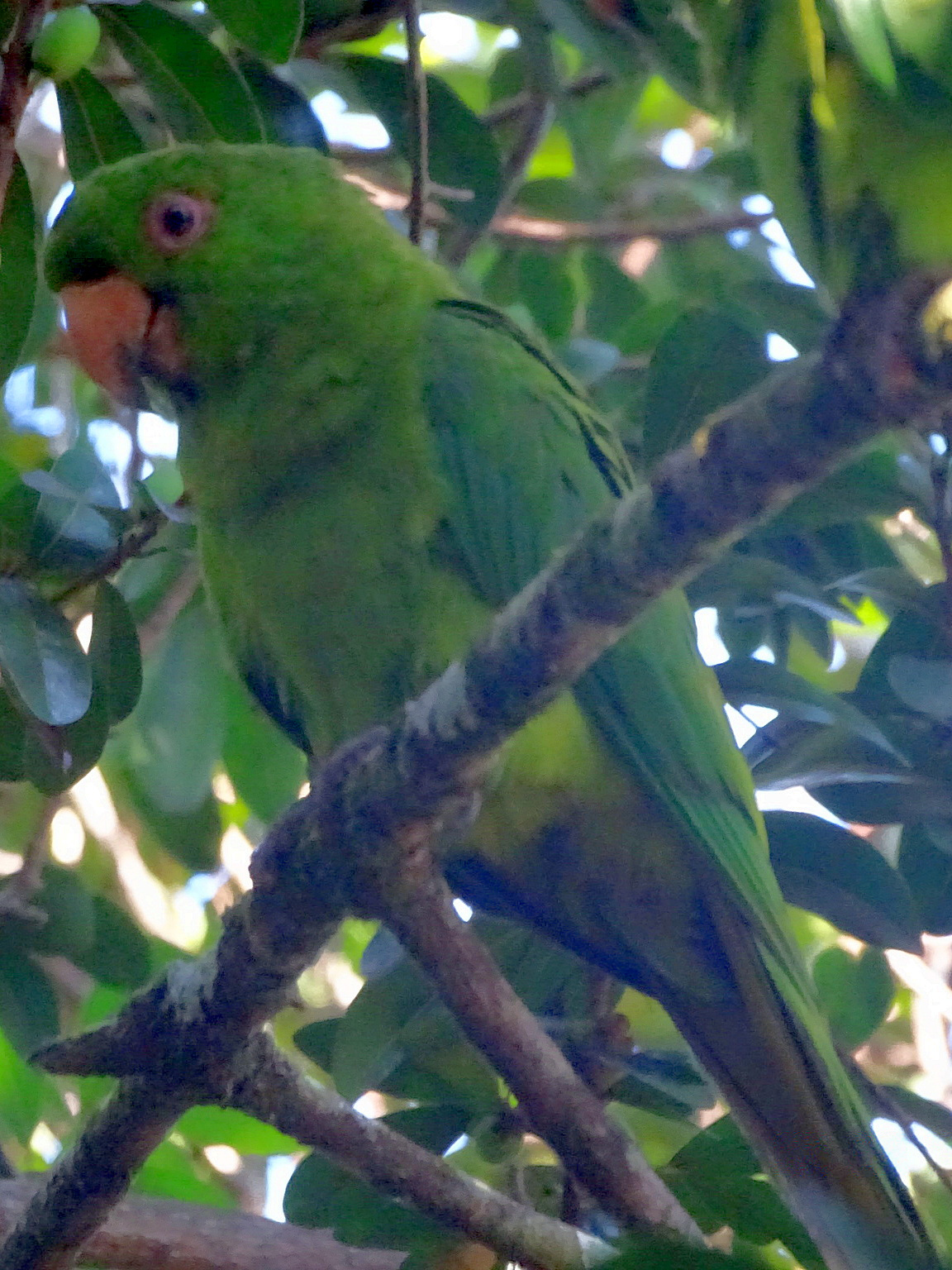

Conservation status
- CITES Appendix II (CITES)

Scientific classification
- Kingdom: Animalia
- Phylum: Chordata
- Class: Aves
- Order: Psittaciformes
- Family: Psittacidae
- Genus: Psittacara
- Species: P. brevipes

Binomial name
- Psittacara brevipes (Lawrence, 1871)

Synonyms
- Aratinga brevipes; Psittacara holochlorus brevipes

= Socorro parakeet =

Species of bird

The Socorro parakeet (Psittacara brevipes), known in aviculture as the Socorro green conure or Socorro conure, is a species of bird in subfamily Arinae of the family Psittacidae, the African and New World parrots. It is endemic to Socorro Island in the Revillagigedo Islands, Mexico.

== Taxonomy and systematics ==
The International Ornithological Committee and the Clements taxonomy treat the Socorro parakeet as a full, monotypic, species. BirdLife International's Handbook of the Birds of the World (HBW) considers it to be a subspecies of the green parakeet (P. holochlorus).

== Description ==
The Socorro parakeet is 31 to 33 cm (12 to 13 in) long. The sexes are alike. It is essentially all green with a somewhat olive tinge to the underside of the flight feathers and tail. Its iris is orange-red surrounded by bare purplish brown skin, its bill horn colored, and its legs brownish.

== Distribution and habitat ==
The Socorro parakeet is found only on Socorro Island off the western coast of Mexico. It inhabits forests dominated by Bumelia socorrensis, Ilex socorroensis, and Guettarda insularis, and is usually found at elevations above 500 m (1,600 ft).

== Behavior ==
=== Movement ===
The Socorro parakeet is sedentary.

=== Feeding ===
One study found that about half of the Socorro parakeet's diet was seeds and fruit pulp of Bumelia socorrensis with those of Ilex socorrensis, Guettarda insularis, and Psidium making up most of the rest.

=== Breeding ===
The Socorro parakeet breeds between October and January. It typically nests in a cavity in a Bumelia socorrensis tree about 2.3 to 3.8 m (8 to 10 ft) above the ground.

=== Vocalization ===
As of early 2023, xeno-canto had only three recordings of Socorro parakeet vocalizations; the Cornell Lab of Ornithology's Macaulay Library had many. Neither described the vocalizations in words.

== Status ==
The IUCN follows HBW taxonomy and so has not assessed the Socorro parakeet separately from the green parakeet. It does note that as a subspecies it is "regarded as highly threatened". The species is threatened by habitat destruction by sheep and predation by feral cats. In 2006 and 2007 its population was estimated at about 300 individuals, a decrease from estimates in the early 1990s of 400 to 500. It may meet the criteria for a Vulnerable or Endangered species.
