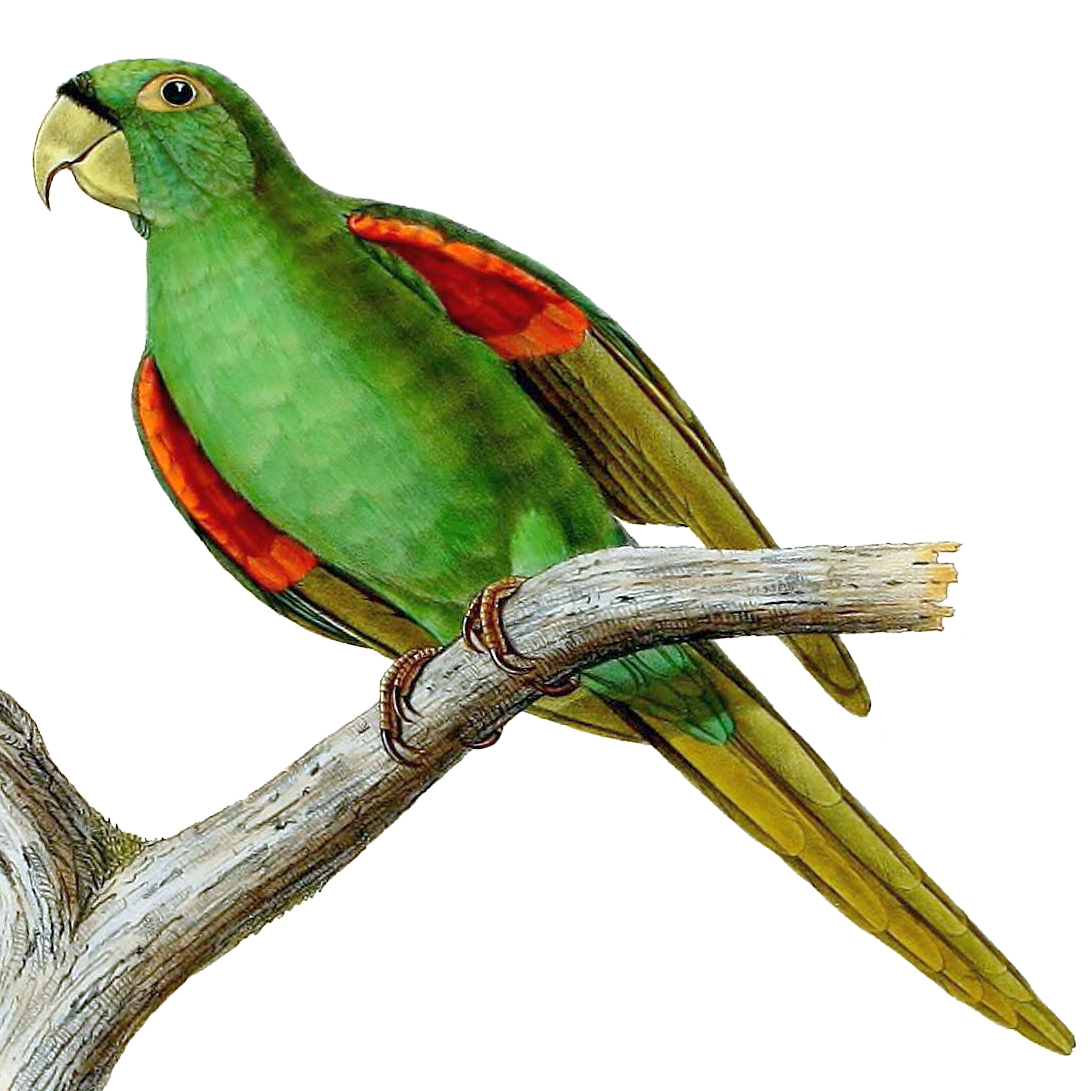
- 19th-century illustration

Conservation status
- Extinct (~1900)

Scientific classification
- Kingdom: Animalia
- Phylum: Chordata
- Class: Aves
- Order: Psittaciformes
- Family: Psittacidae
- Genus: Psittacara
- Species: †P. maugei

Binomial name
- †Psittacara maugei Souancé, 1856

Synonyms
- Aratinga chloroptera maugei Psittacara chloroptera maugei

= Puerto Rican parakeet =

Species of bird

The Puerto Rican parakeet or Puerto Rican conure (Psittacara maugei) is an extinct species of parrot that was found on Mona Island and possibly in Puerto Rico.

== Description ==
Turnaround video of specimen RMNH 110079, Naturalis Biodiversity Center

The bird was similar to the Hispaniolan parakeet (Psittacara chloropterus), of which it was once considered a subspecies (some sources, such as the IUCN, still follow this taxonomy.) Its feathers were a duller green, and the red markings on the wing were more extensive.

== Ecology ==
The bird fed primarily upon seeds, fruits, nuts and berries. It may also have eaten leaf buds and flowers. Nesting took place in hollow trees, old woodpecker holes and arboreal termite nests.

== Behavior ==
The Puerto Rican parakeet was a very gregarious bird, noted for its loud, continuous calling. While the bird was normally cautious, avoiding contact with humans, this lessened while feeding. As the bird often fed in farmers' fields on crops such as maize, this contributed to its widespread hunting.

== Extinction ==
The last bird was seen in 1882, by W. W. Brown, who collected the specimen which now resides at the Field Museum in Chicago. The date of extinction is not well recorded. It was referred to as still being extant in 1905, but reported as extinct in 1950. Hunting by humans is believed to be the primary cause of extinction. It was noted by James Bond that the bird was seemingly unafraid of gunshots, making it particularly vulnerable to hunting. Bond attributed the bird's extinction to the large number of pigeon hunters who travelled to Mona Island. Deforestation of the island may also have played a role.

Three specimens of the bird still exist. Beyond the one in the Field Museum, the Nationaal Natuurhistorisch Museum in Leiden and the Muséum National d'Histoire Naturelle in Paris each possess one skin. Although it is believed the species may also have existed on Puerto Rico, all the existing specimens were collected from Mona Island. The specimen in the Muséum National d'Histoire Naturelle is the type specimen.

== See also ==
- Fauna of Puerto Rico
- List of birds of Puerto Rico
- List of endemic fauna of Puerto Rico
- List of Puerto Rican birds
- List of Vieques birds
- El Toro Wilderness
