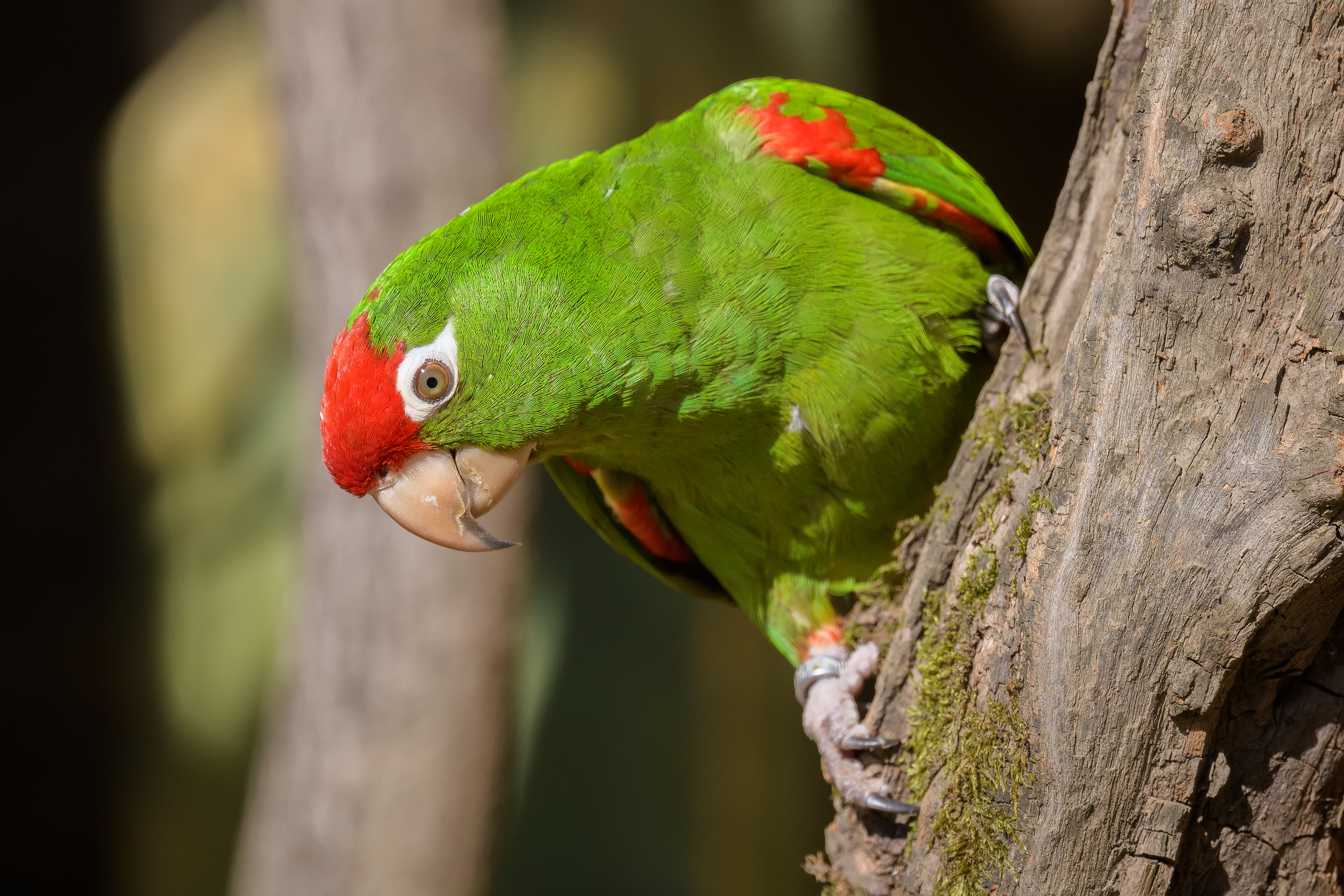

Conservation status
- Near Threatened (IUCN 3.1)
- CITES Appendix II

Scientific classification
- Kingdom: Animalia
- Phylum: Chordata
- Class: Aves
- Order: Psittaciformes
- Family: Psittacidae
- Genus: Psittacara
- Species: P. frontatus

Binomial name
- Psittacara frontatus (Cabanis, 1846)

Synonyms
- Psittacara wagleri frontatus

= Cordilleran parakeet =

Species of bird

The cordilleran parakeet (Psittacara frontatus) is a Near Threatened species of bird in subfamily Arinae of the family Psittacidae, the African and New World parrots. It is found in Ecuador and Peru.

== Taxonomy and systematics ==
The cordilleran parakeet was for a time placed in the genus Aratinga but from about 2013 has been in its present genus Psittacara. Its taxonomy is otherwise unsettled. The International Ornithological Committee (IOC), BirdLife International's Handbook of the Birds of the World (HBW), and the Clements taxonomy assign it two subspecies, the nominate P. f. frontatus (Cabanis, 1846) and P. f. minor (Carriker, 1933). The American Ornithological Society treats the two taxa as subspecies of the scarlet-fronted parakeet (P. wagleri, GR Gray, 1845).

== Description ==
The cordilleran parakeet is 34 to 40 cm (13 to 16 in) long and weighs 162 to 217 g (5.7 to 7.7 oz). The sexes are alike. Adults are generally green that is yellower on the underparts; some have red speckles on their throat. Their forehead, the front part of their crown, and the bend of their wing are red. The undersides of their flight feathers and tail are olive-yellow. Their iris is pale gray surrounded by bare white skin, their bill horn colored, and their legs and feet brownish. Subspecies P. f. minor is overall somewhat smaller and greener than the nominate, the red on its crown is paler, and some individuals have yellow at the bend of the wing. Immature birds resemble adults but with less red on their head.

== Distribution and habitat ==
The nominate subspecies of the cordilleran parakeet is found on the western slope of the Andes in Ecuador's Loja Province and south through most of western Peru. Subspecies P. f. minor is found in inter-Andean valleys of the Marañón and Pampas rivers in northern and south-central Peru. The species inhabits a variety of landscapes including the edges of cloudforest, montane forest, and gallery and secondary forest. It also occurs in agricultural areas, and parks in built-up areas. In elevation it ranges from 1,000 to 2,500 m (3,300 to 8,200 ft) in Ecuador and as high as 3,000 m (9,800 ft) in Peru.

== Behavior ==
=== Movement ===
The cordilleran parakeet's movements, if any, have not been documented. It travels in small flocks.

=== Feeding ===
The cordilleran parakeet usually forages in the forest canopy. Its diet has not been fully described but is known to include fruits, nuts, and seeds.

=== Breeding ===
The cordilleran parakeet's nesting season is not known. It breeds in small colonies, usually in fissures in cliff faces.

=== Vocalization ===
The cordilleran parakeet is very vocal, especially in flight with "a continuous loud screeching chatter". It also makes "[s]queaky notes and screeches, kreee".

== Status ==
The IUCN has assessed the cordilleran parakeet as Near Threatened. Though it has a fairly large range, its population size is not known and is believed to be decreasing. The primary threats are "trapping pressure, persecution and habitat loss and land-use change." It is rare and local in Ecuador and common in some areas in Peru.
