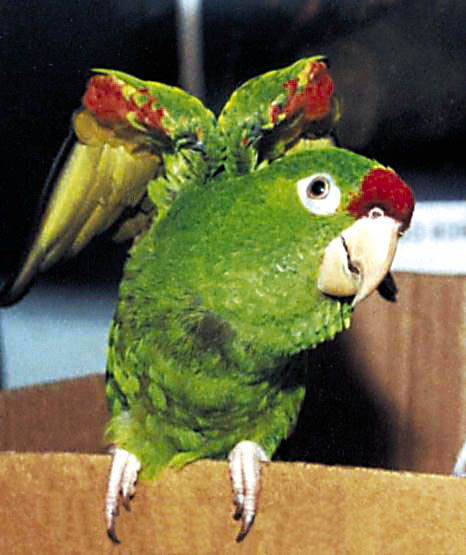

Conservation status
- Least Concern (IUCN 3.1)
- CITES Appendix II (CITES)

Scientific classification
- Kingdom: Animalia
- Phylum: Chordata
- Class: Aves
- Order: Psittaciformes
- Family: Psittacidae
- Genus: Psittacara
- Species: P. finschi

Binomial name
- Psittacara finschi (Salvin, 1871)

Synonyms
- Conurus finschi, Salvin, 1871 Aratinga finschi, Salvin, 1871 Aratinga leucophthalma finshi, Salvin, 1871

= Finsch's parakeet =

Species of bird

Finsch's parakeet (Psittacara finschi), also known as the crimson-fronted parakeet and in aviculture as Finsch's conure, is a species of bird in subfamily Arinae of the family Psittacidae, the African and New World parrots. It is found in Costa Rica, Nicaragua, and Panama.

== Taxonomy and systematics ==
Finsch's parakeet was for a time placed in the genus Aratinga but from about 2013 has been in its present genus Psittacara. It was for a time treated as a subspecies of the white-eyed parakeet (P. leucophthalmus), and they constitute a superspecies. It is monotypic.

== Description ==
Finsch's parakeet is about 28 cm (11 in) long and weighs 135 to 175 g (4.8 to 6.2 oz). The sexes are alike. Adults are mostly green that is yellowish on their underparts. They have a red forehead (the "front" of their alternate English name) and some red flecks elsewhere on their head. The edge of their wing and their outer underwing coverts are also red, often with an orange tinge. Their greater underwing coverts are yellow. The undersides of their flight feathers and tail are olive yellow. Their thighs usually have some red. Their eye is orange surrounded by bare white skin and their bill is horn colored. Juveniles resemble adults, but have little or no red on the head and none on the thighs. Their eyes are gray.

== Distribution and habitat ==
Finsch's parakeet is found from southeastern Nicaragua, on both the Pacific and Caribbean slopes of Costa Rica, and into Panama's Pacific slope as far east as the Azuero Peninsula. It inhabits a variety of semi-open to open landscapes including woodlands, the edges of denser forest, secondary forest, ranchlands and agricultural areas that have groves of trees, coffee plantations, and towns. In elevation it ranges from sea level to 1,800 m (5,900 ft).

== Behavior ==
Finsch's parakeet is rather social, often gathering in flocks of about 30 individuals, and several hundred may roost together.

=== Movement ===
Finsch's parakeet wanders widely, making irregular and seasonal movements that are not well defined. In the dry season, increased numbers are present on the Pacific side of Costa Rica.

=== Feeding ===
Finsch's parakeet feeds on fruits and flowers of a variety of plants and trees. It also feeds on maize and sorghum. It has been observed feeding on wood, an uncommon habit in parrots.

=== Breeding ===
Finsch's parakeet nests in Costa Rica during the dry and early wet seasons of December to May, and is thought to nest in July in Panama. It nests in tree cavities which it sometimes excavates itself in rotten wood. It sometimes nests semi-colonially. The clutch is usually three to four eggs. The incubation period, time to fledging, and details of parental care are not known.

=== Vocalization ===
Finsch's parakeet is very vocal, especially in flight with "a jangling chattering" described as "klee-klee-chee-chee...". It also makes "[s]harp squeaky notes and loud harsh calls" described as "scree-ah".

== Status ==
The IUCN has assessed Finsch's parakeet as being of Least Concern. It has a large range and its estimated population of at least a half million mature individuals is believed to be stable. No immediate threats have been identified. It is considered abundant in Nicaragua, common in Costa Rica, and locally common in Panama. Its range appears to be increasing as deforestation provides the more open landscapes it prefers. It has not been subject to much cage bird trafficking.

== Gallery ==
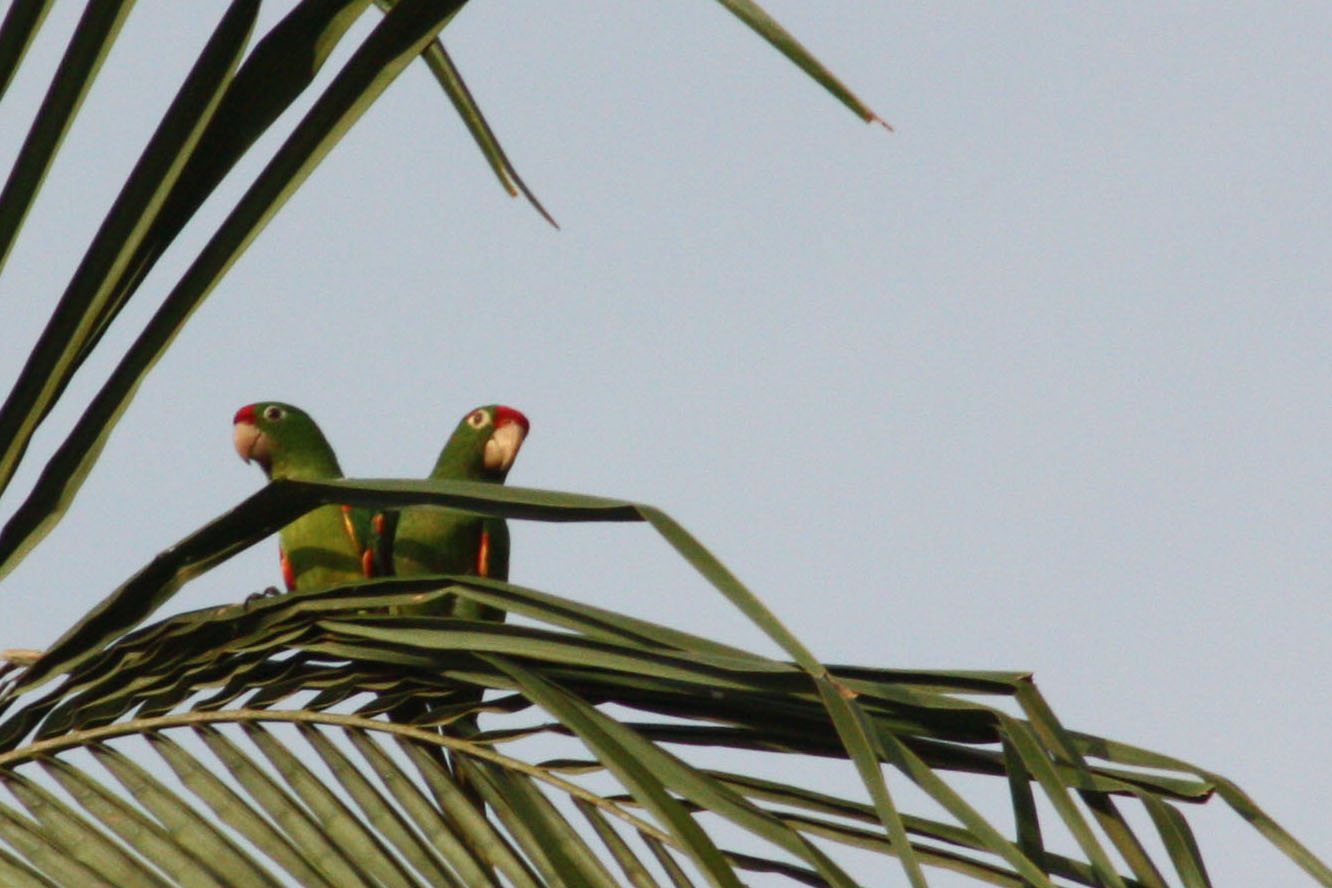
Pair in the wild on the Osa Peninsula, Costa Rica

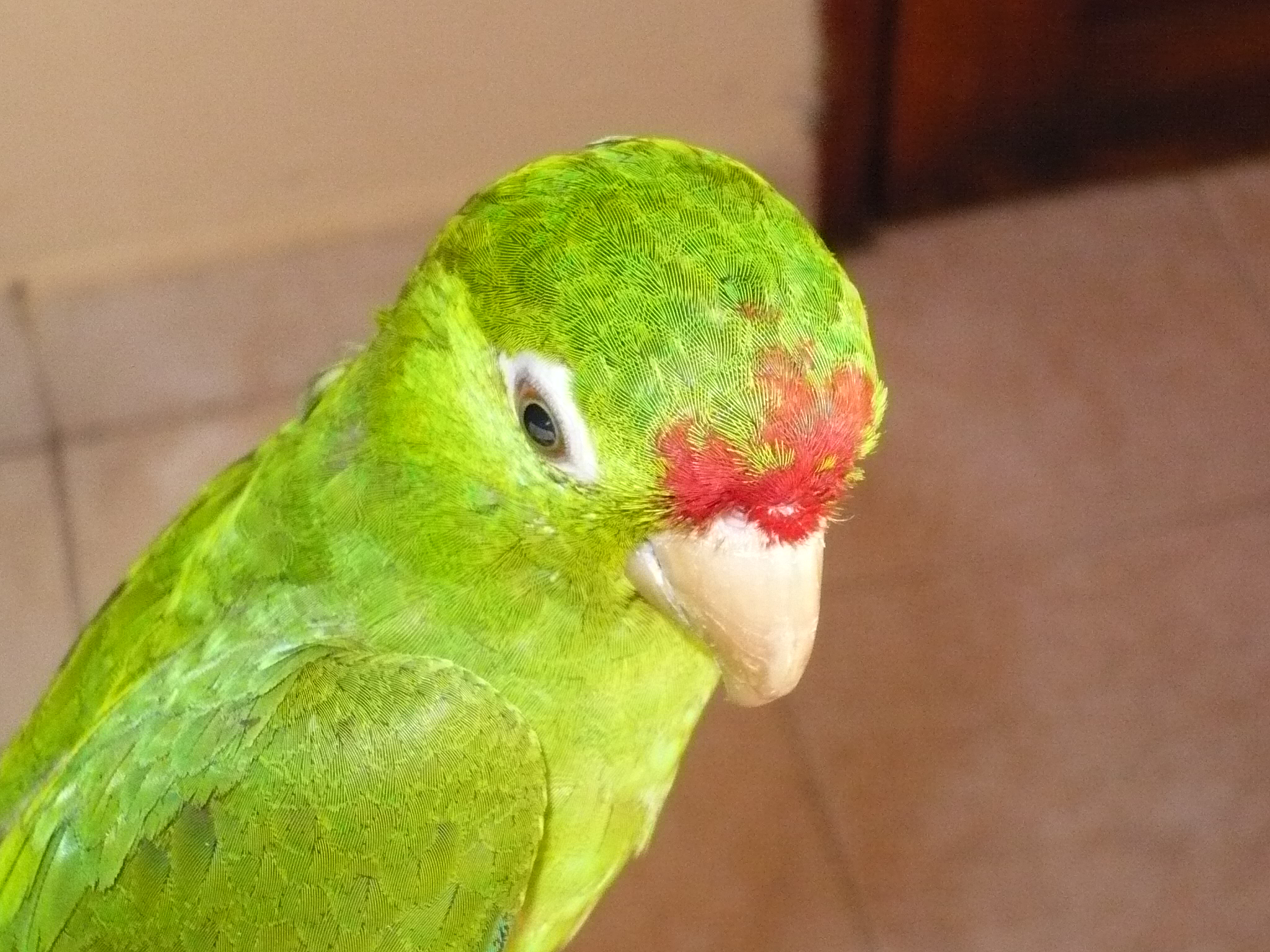
Juvenile

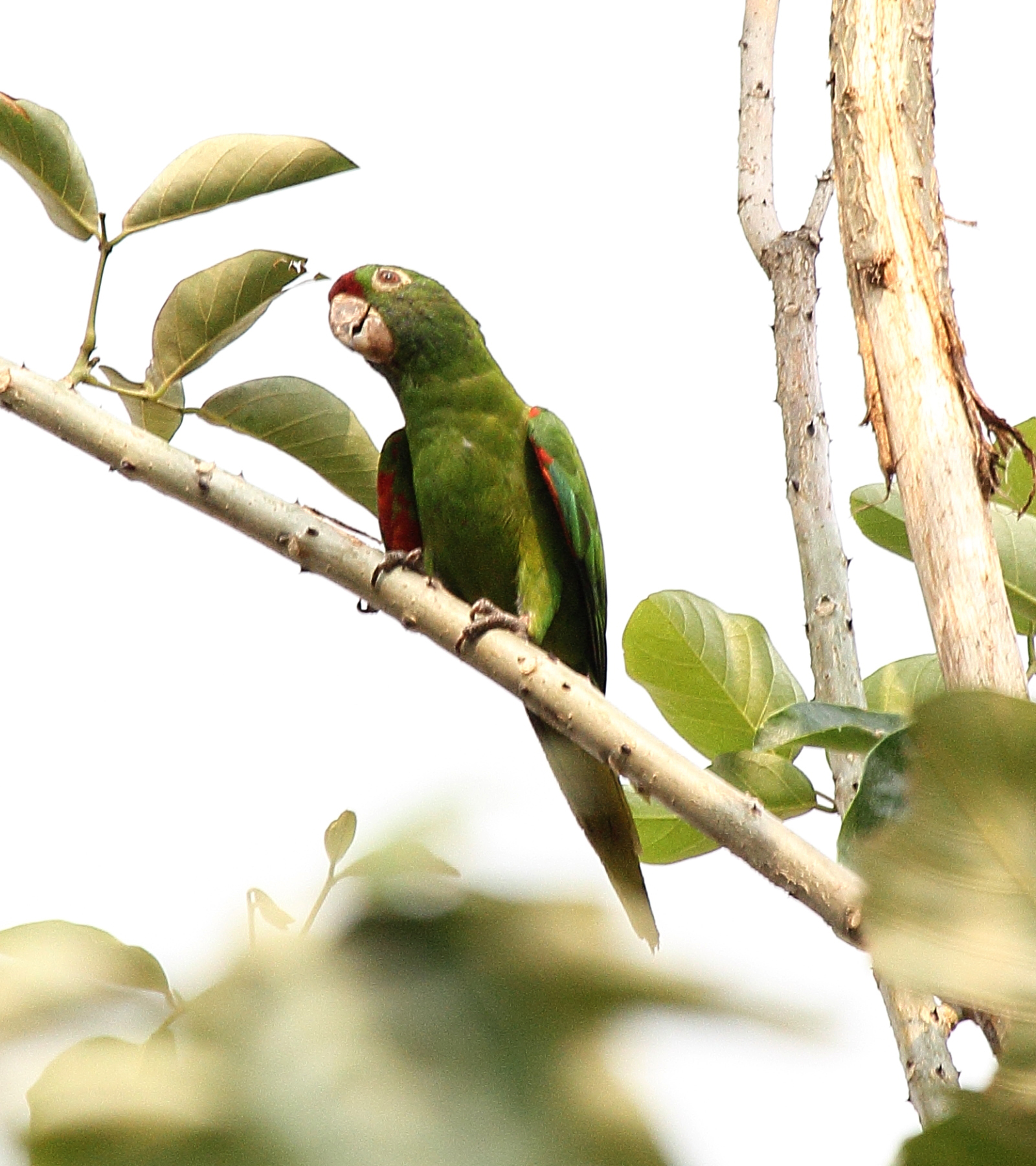
Adult in San José, Costa Rica
