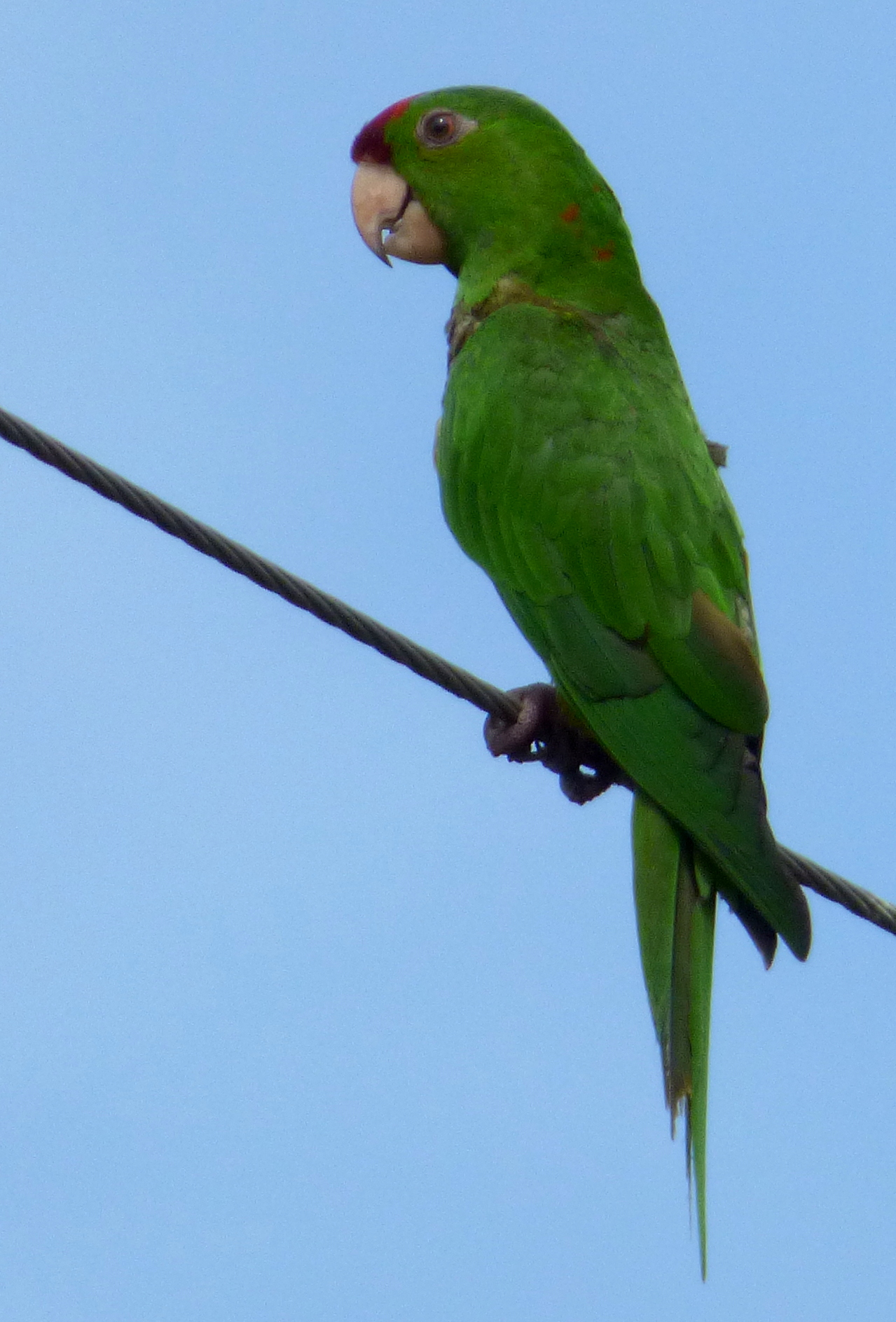

Conservation status
- Near Threatened (IUCN 3.1)
- CITES Appendix II

Scientific classification
- Kingdom: Animalia
- Phylum: Chordata
- Class: Aves
- Order: Psittaciformes
- Family: Psittacidae
- Genus: Psittacara
- Species: P. wagleri

Binomial name
- Psittacara wagleri (GR Gray, 1845)

Synonyms
- Aratinga wagleri

= Scarlet-fronted parakeet =

Species of bird

The scarlet-fronted parakeet (Psittacara wagleri), known in aviculture as the scarlet-fronted conure, red-fronted conure, or Wagler's conure, is a Near Threatened species of bird in subfamily Arinae of the family Psittacidae, the African and New World parrots. It is found in Colombia and Venezuela.

== Taxonomy and systematics ==
The scarlet-fronted parakeet was for a time placed in the genus Aratinga but from about 2013 has been in its present genus Psittacara. Its taxonomy is otherwise unsettled. The International Ornithological Committee (IOC), BirdLife International's Handbook of the Birds of the World (HBW), and the Clements taxonomy assign it two subspecies, the nominate P. w. wagleri (G.R. Gray, 1845) and P. w. transilis (J.L. Peters, 1927). The American Ornithological Society assigns two others, P. w. frontatus (Cabanis, 1846) and P. w. minor (Carriker, 1933). The IOC, HBW, and Clements treat them as the two subspecies of the cordilleran parakeet (P. frontatus).

This article follows the two-subspecies model.

== Description ==
The scarlet-fronted parakeet is 34 to 40 cm (13 to 16 in) long and weighs 162 to 217 g (5.7 to 7.7 oz). The sexes are alike. Adults are generally green that is yellower on the underparts; some have red speckles on their throat. Their English name comes from their red forehead and the front part of their crown. The undersides of their flight feathers and tail are olive-yellow. Their iris is pale gray surrounded by bare gray skin, their bill horn colored, and their legs and feet brownish. Subspecies P. w. transilis is overall somewhat smaller and darker than the nominate, and the red on its crown does not extend as far to the rear. Immature birds resemble adults but with less red on their head.

== Distribution and habitat ==
The scarlet-fronted parakeet has a disjunct distribution. The nominate subspecies is found in the Colombian Andes, the isolated Sierra Nevada de Santa Marta in northern Colombia, in the Serranía del Perijá that straddles the Colombia/Venezuela border, and in western Venezuela. Subspecies P. w. transilis is found in extreme eastern Colombia and in northern Venezuela from Falcón east to Sucre and Monagas. The species inhabits a variety of landscapes including the edges of cloudforest, tropical deciduous forest, and gallery and secondary forest. It also occurs in fields, orchards, and parks in built-up areas. In elevation it ranges from 350 to 2,500 m (1,100 to 8,200 ft).

== Behavior ==
=== Movement ===
The scarlet-fronted parakeet makes seasonal movements in Venezuela; its movements, if any, in Colombia have not been defined. It travels in large flocks.

=== Feeding ===
The scarlet-fronted parakeet usually forages in the forest canopy. Its diet has not been fully described but is known to include fruits, nuts, and seeds. In some areas it may be a crop pest.

=== Breeding ===
The scarlet-fronted parakeet nests from April to June in Venezuela and December to June in northern Colombia. It breeds colonially, usually in fissures in cliff faces.

=== Vocalization ===
The scarlet-fronted parakeet is very vocal, especially in flight with "a continuous loud screeching chatter". It also makes "[s]queaky notes and screeches, kreee".

== Status ==
The IUCN has assessed the scarlet-fronted parakeet as Near Threatened. It has a fragmented range; its population size is not known and is believed to be decreasing. The primary threats are "trapping pressure, persecution and habitat loss through land-use change."
