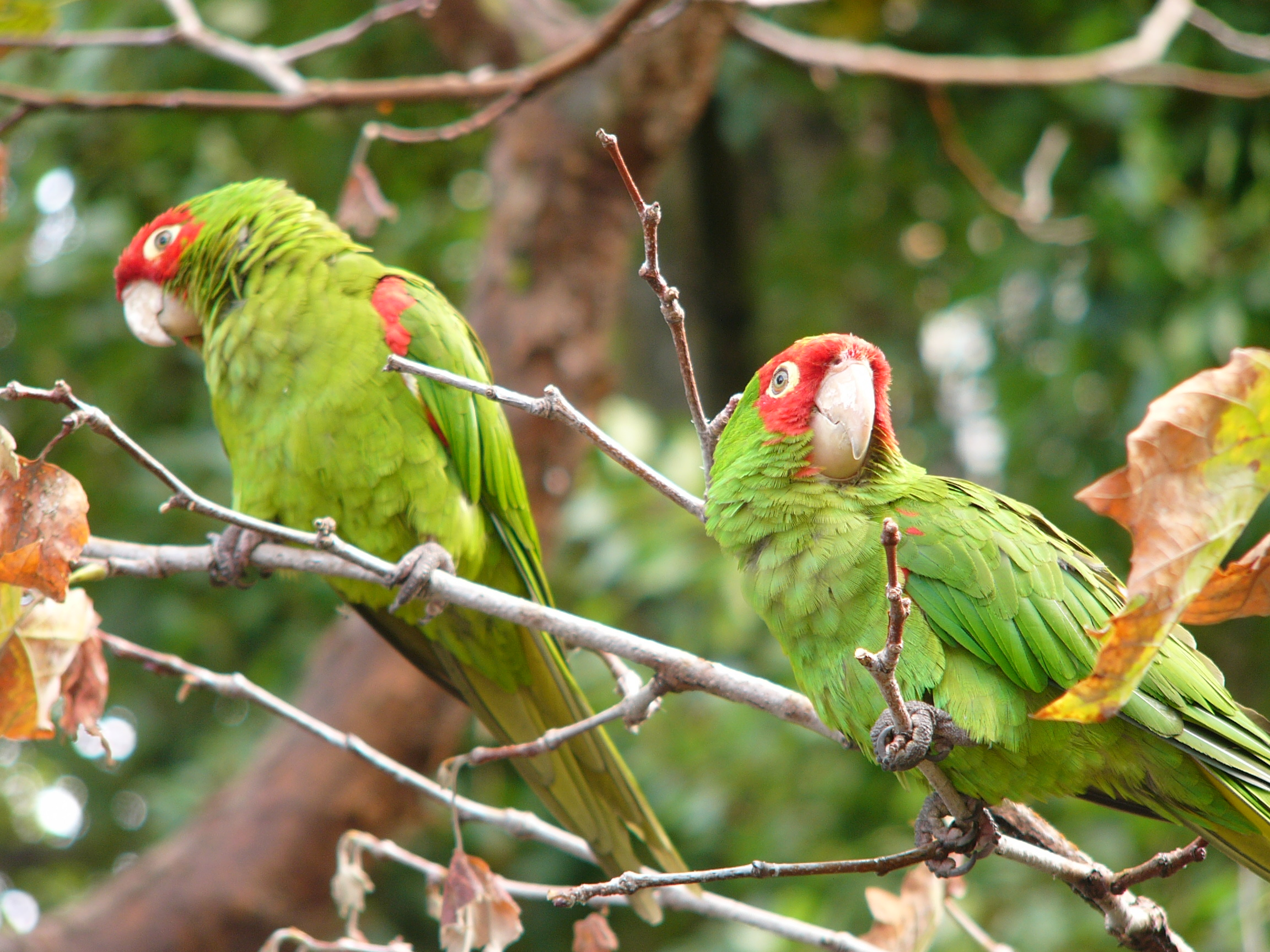
- Red-masked parakeet (Psittacara erythrogenys), feral birds in a tree in California, United States

Scientific classification
- Kingdom: Animalia
- Phylum: Chordata
- Class: Aves
- Order: Psittaciformes
- Family: Psittacidae
- Tribe: Arini
- Genus: Psittacara; Vigors, 1825

Type species
- Psittacus gujanensis Gmelin, JF, 1788

Species
- See text.

= Psittacara =

Genus of birds

Psittacara is a genus of parakeets in the tribe Arini. Species of the genus are found in Central and South America, the Caribbean and one species reaching the southern United States. Until 2013, all the species were placed in the genus Aratinga. Many of the Psittacara species are kept in aviculture or as companion parrots, where they are commonly known as conures.

== Taxonomy ==
The members of this genus were formerly placed in the genus Aratinga. Molecular phylogenetic studies had found that Aratinga was non-monophyletic so in order to create monophylectic genera James Van Remsen Jr. and collaborators proposed in 2013 that Aratinga should be split and a group of species moved to the resurrected genus Psittacara. The genus had been introduced in 1825 by the Irish zoologist Nicholas Aylward Vigors with the white-eyed parakeet as the type species.

=== Species ===
The genus contains 12 species including one which is now extinct:

Genus Psittacara – Vigors, 1825 – twelve species
Common name	Scientific name and subspecies	Range	Size and ecology	IUCN status and estimated population
Green parakeet	Psittacara holochlorus (Sclater, PL, 1859) Two subspecies: P. h. brewsteri (Nelson, 1928); P. h. holochlorus (Sclater, PL, 1859); P. h. rubritorquis (Sclater, PL, 1887)	Mexico (Nuevo León and Tamaulipas south to Veracruz)	Size: Habitat: Diet:	LC
Socorro parakeet	Psittacara brevipes (Lawrence, 1871)	Socorro Island in the Revillagigedo Islands, Mexico	Size: Habitat: Diet:	
Pacific parakeet	Psittacara strenuus (Ridgway, 1915)	southern Mexico, Guatemala, El Salvador, Honduras, and Nicaragua.	Size: Habitat: Diet:	
Scarlet-fronted parakeet	Psittacara wagleri (GR Gray, 1845) Two subspecies: P. w. wagleri (G.R. Gray, 1845); P. w. transilis (J.L. Peters, 1927)	Colombia and Venezuela.	Size: Habitat: Diet:	NT
Cordilleran parakeet	Psittacara frontatus (Cabanis, 1846) Two subspecies: P. f. frontatus (Cabanis, 1846); P. f. minor (Carriker, 1933)	Eucador's Loja Province and south through most of western Peru	Size: Habitat: Diet:	NT
Mitred parakeet	Psittacara mitratus (Tschudi, 1844) Three subspecies: P. m. chlorogenys (Arndt, 2006); P. m. mitratus (Tschudi, 1844); P. m. tucumanus (Arndt, 2006)	Argentina, Bolivia, and Peru.	Size: Habitat: Diet:	LC
Red-masked parakeet	Psittacara erythrogenys Lesson, 1844	Ecuador and Peru.	Size: Habitat: Diet:	NT
Finsch's parakeet	Psittacara finschi (Salvin, 1871)	Costa Rica, Nicaragua, and Panama	Size: Habitat: Diet:	LC
White-eyed parakeet	Psittacara leucophthalmus (Müller, PLS, 1776) Three subspecies: P. l. callogenys (Salvadori, 1891); P. l. leucophthalmus (Müller, P.L.S., 1776); P. l. nicefori (Meyer de Schauensee, 1946)	Trinidad and from eastern Venezuela east through the Guianas and south through Brazil into Bolivia, Paraguay, northern Argentina, and Uruguay.	Size: Habitat: Diet:	LC
Cuban parakeet	Psittacara euops (Wagler, 1832)	Cuba	Size: Habitat: Diet:	VU
Hispaniolan parakeet	Psittacara chloropterus Souancé, 1856	Dominican Republic and Haiti	Size: Habitat: Diet:	VU
† Puerto Rican parakeet	Psittacara maugei (Souancé, 1856)	Mona Island	Size: Habitat: Diet: seeds, fruits, nuts and berries.	EX

=== Hypothetical species ===
- † Guadeloupe parakeet (Psittacara labati)
  - Jean-Baptiste Labat described a population of small parrots living on Guadeloupe, which have been postulated to be a separate species based on little evidence. They were originally named Conurus labati, but no specimens or remains of these parrots exist. Their taxonomy may never be fully elucidated, and so their postulated status as a separate species is hypothetical.
