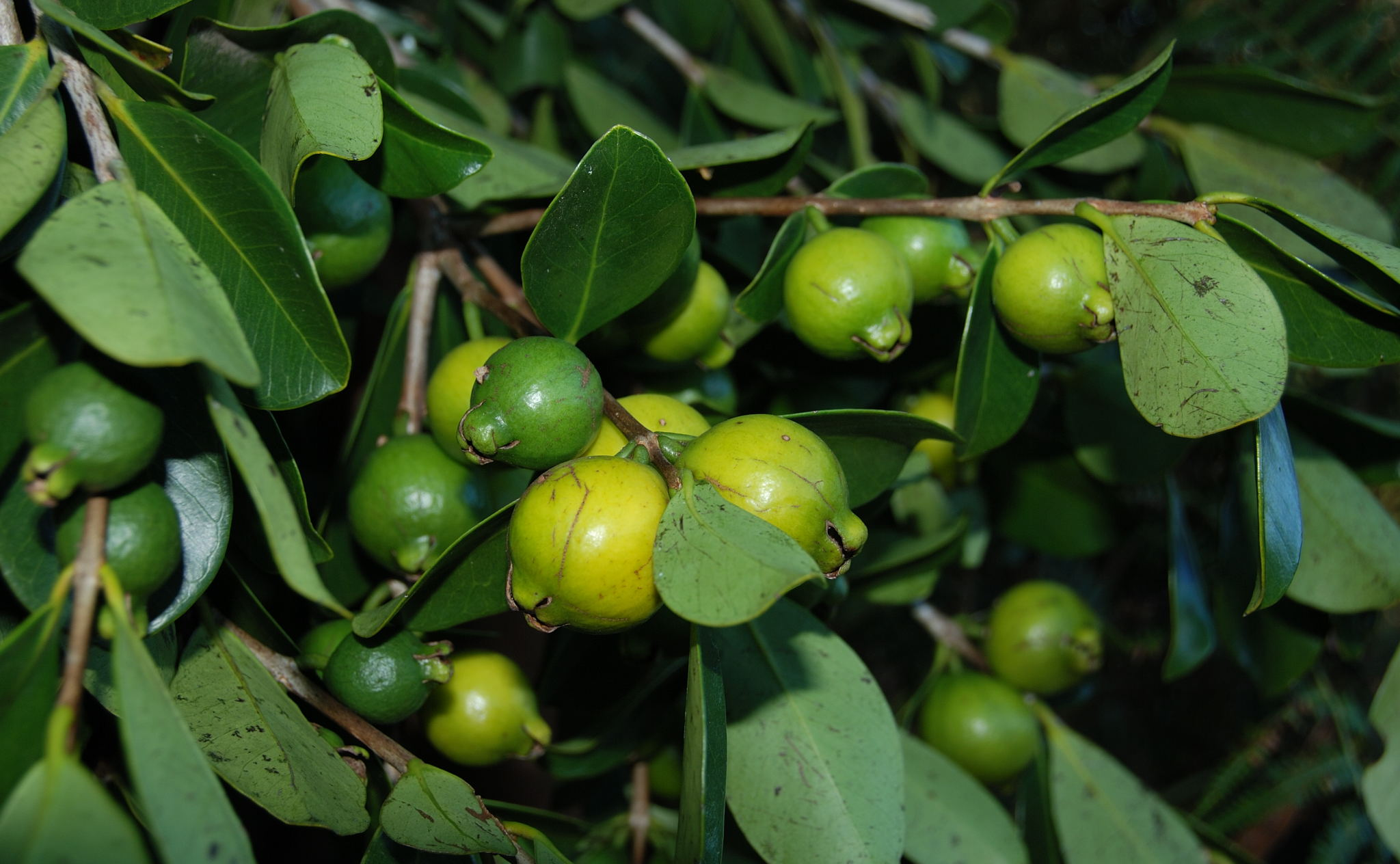

Conservation status
- Least Concern (IUCN 3.1)

Scientific classification
- Kingdom: Plantae
- Clade: Tracheophytes
- Clade: Angiosperms
- Clade: Eudicots
- Clade: Rosids
- Order: Myrtales
- Family: Myrtaceae
- Genus: Psidium
- Species: P. oligospermum

Binomial name
- Psidium oligospermum Mart. ex DC. (1828)

Synonyms
- Synonymy: Calycorectes protractus Griseb. (1866); Calyptranthes eugenioides Cambess. (1833); Calyptranthes tonduzii Donn.Sm. (1896); Calyptropsidium sartorianum (O.Berg) Krug & Urb. (1895); Calyptropsidium sintenisii Kiaersk. (1890); Chytraculia eugenioides (Cambess.) Kuntze (1891); Chytraculia gardneriana (O.Berg) Kuntze (1891); Chytraculia sartoriana (O.Berg) Kuntze (1891); Guajava oligosperma (Mart. ex DC.) Kuntze (1891); Mitranthes eugenioides (Cambess.) O.Berg (1856); Mitranthes eugenioides var. oblongifolia O.Berg (1857); Mitranthes eugenioides var. ovata O.Berg (1857); Mitranthes gardneriana O.Berg (1857); Mitranthes sartoriana O.Berg (1858); Mitropsidium eugenioides (Cambess.) Burret (1941); Mitropsidium gardnerianum (O.Berg) Burret (1941); Mitropsidium oblanceolatum Burret (1941); Mitropsidium oligospermum (Mart. ex DC.) Burret (1941); Mitropsidium pittieri Burret (1941); Mitropsidium sartorianum (O.Berg) Burret (1941); Mitropsidium sintenisii (Kiaersk.) Burret (1941); Myrtus claraensis (Urb.) Bisse (1976 publ. 1977); Psidium calyptranthoides Alain (1983); Psidium ciliatum O.Berg (1856), nom. illeg.; Psidium claraense Urb. (1928); Psidium eugenioides (Cambess.) Nied. (1893), nom. illeg.; Psidium galapagaeum Hook.f. (1847); Psidium galapagaeum var. howellii D.M.Porter (1969); Psidium microphyllum Britton (1930); Psidium minutiflorum Amshoff (1950); Psidium molinae Amshoff (1956); Psidium protractum (Griseb.) Lundell (1974); Psidium sartorianum (O.Berg) Nied. (1893); Psidium sartorianum var. yucatanense McVaugh (1963); Psidium sintenisii (Kiaersk.) Alain (1971); Psidium socorrense I.M.Johnst. (1931); Psidium solisii Standl. (1944); Psidium yucatanense Lundell (1942)

= Psidium oligospermum =

Species of shrub

Psidium oligospermum, the Galápagos guava or guayabillo, is a small tree or shrub native to the tropical Americas, ranging from Mexico through the Revillagigedo Islands, Central America, Cuba, Puerto Rico, the Windward Islands, the Galápagos Islands, and South America to central Brazil and northwestern Argentina.

== Description ==
Psidium oligospermum is either a small tree or shrub that ranges up to 8 m (26 ft) in height and up to 1 m (3 ft 3 in) in diameter, with smooth, pinkish-grey bark. It has wide-spreading branches with dotted grey branchlets with reddish to white or yellowish "trichomes" or hairs. The branchlets tend to become more smooth at the edges and the bark more stringy, and the terminal branchlets and leaves are sometimes covered with a scurfy reddish bloom.

Its leaves are opposite and elliptic to ovate, with the tips of the leaves being acute to acuminate. The base of the leaf is narrowly cuneate and is decurrent on the stalk of the leaf. The entire leaf is glabrous and is generally darker on the upper face and paler on the other side. The leaves are generally 21–54 mm (0.83–2.13 in) long and 9–26 mm (0.35–1.02 in) wide, and the petioles, or leaf stalks, are generally 1–3 mm (0.039–0.118 in) long.

The buds of Psidium oligospermum are pear-shaped or "pyriform" and connected to the base of the branchlet, extending about 1–1.5 mm (0.039–0.059 in) out. The bud is glabrous except for a minute hole at the apex with a few trichomes protruding 4–5 mm (0.16–0.20 in) outward.

Flowers are white, occur on branches of recent growth, and are relatively small, being 1–1.5 cm (0.39–0.59 in) in diameter. Its berries are spherical in shape and are glabrous except for ripples created from glands in the berries. The berries are yellow when mature and turn black or a reddish-brown when dried. They are 6–13 mm (0.24–0.51 in) in diameter and the "pericarp", or wall of the berry is about 1 mm (0.039 in) thick. The seeds are angular, dark, and 5 mm (0.20 in) long, and each locule contains several.

== Habitat and ecology ==
In the Galápagos Islands Psidium oligspermum is found on the islands Fernandina, Isabella, Pinta, Santa Cruz, and Santiago. It typically grows in arid lowlands and moist uplands.

On Socorro Island in the Revillagigedo Islands, it is a canopy tree in upper-elevation Ilex socorroensis forest, with Ilex socorroensis, Guettarda insularis, and Sideroxylon socorrense.

== Uses ==
The berries of Psidium oligospermum are edible, reportedly with a slight taste of turpentine, and geese are reported to frequently consume the berries. The wood of the tree is used locally in the Galápagos Islands as fencing or a building material, but is not very hardy nor enduring.
