= Guettarda insularis =

Conservation status
- Critically Endangered (IUCN 3.1)

Scientific classification
- Kingdom: Plantae
- Clade: Tracheophytes
- Clade: Angiosperms
- Clade: Eudicots
- Clade: Asterids
- Order: Gentianales
- Family: Rubiaceae
- Genus: Guettarda
- Species: G. insularis

Binomial name
- Guettarda insularis Brandeegee (1924)

Species of flowering plant

Guettarda insularis is a species of flowering plant. It is a large shrubby tree native to Socorro Island, the largest of the Revillagigedo Islands which lie west of Mexico's Pacific coast.

Guettarda insularis is prominent in Socorro's higher-elevation forests, which occur between 350 and 850 meters (1,150 and 2,790 ft) elevation. Other forest canopy trees include Ilex socorroensis, Sideroxylon socorrense, and Psidium oligospermum.

The fruit of the tree is eaten by the Socorro parakeet (Psittacara brevipes).
