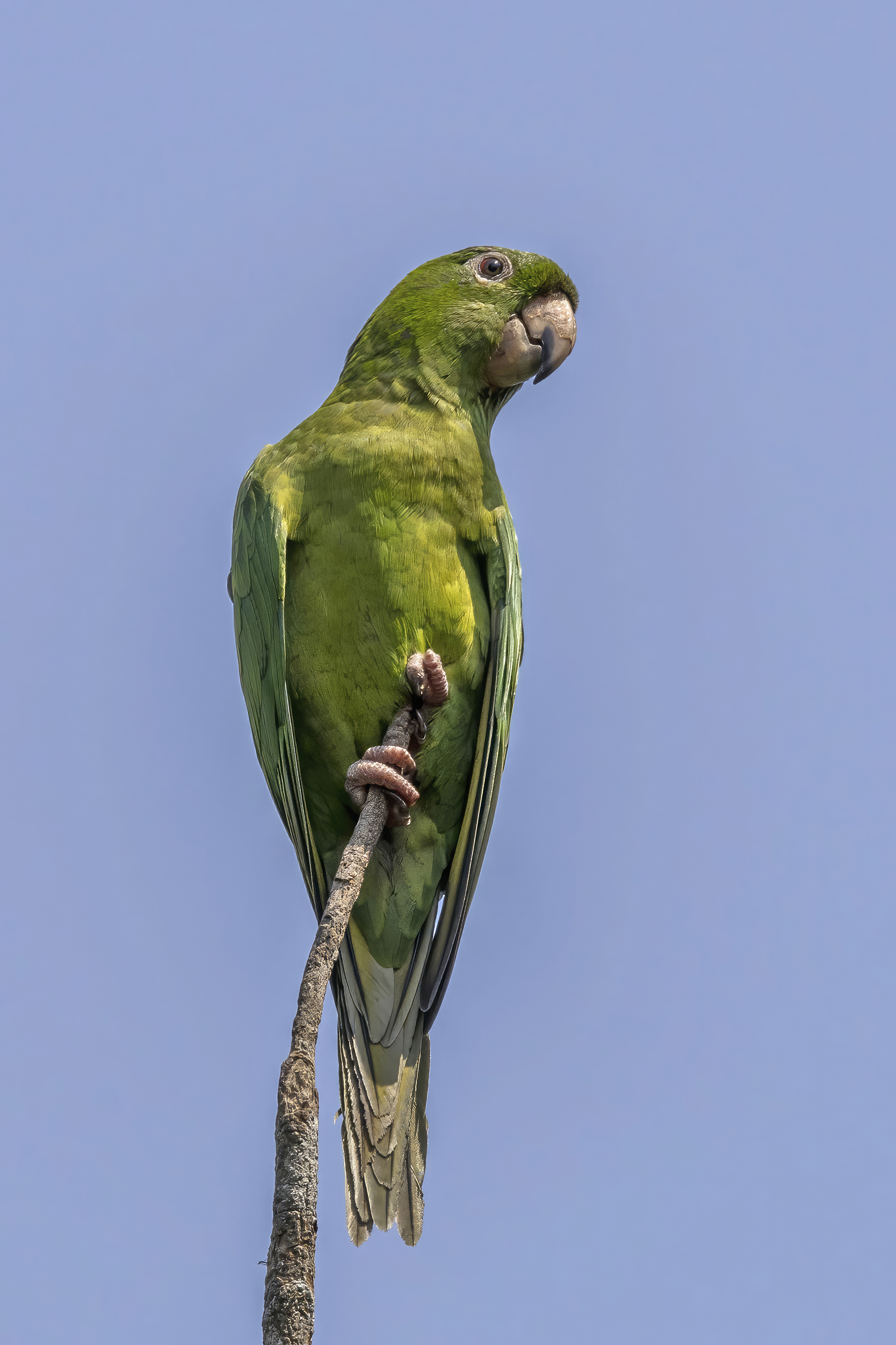
- Suchitepéquez Department, Guatemala

Conservation status
- CITES Appendix II

Scientific classification
- Kingdom: Animalia
- Phylum: Chordata
- Class: Aves
- Order: Psittaciformes
- Family: Psittacidae
- Genus: Psittacara
- Species: P. strenuus

Binomial name
- Psittacara strenuus (Ridgway, 1915)

Synonyms
- P. holochlorus strenuus

= Pacific parakeet =

Species of bird

The Pacific parakeet (Psittacara strenuus), known as Pacific conure or Nicaraguan green conure in aviculture, is a species of bird in subfamily Arinae of the family Psittacidae, the African and New World parrots. It is found in southern Mexico, Guatemala, El Salvador, Honduras, and Nicaragua.

== Taxonomy and systematics ==
The Pacific parakeet was for a time placed in the genus Aratinga but from about 2013 has been in its present genus Psittacara. Its taxonomy is otherwise unsettled. The International Ornithological Committee, the American Ornithological Society, and the Clements taxonomy treat it as a full, monotypic, species. BirdLife International's Handbook of the Birds of the World (HBW) considers it to be a subspecies of the green parakeet (P. holochlorus).

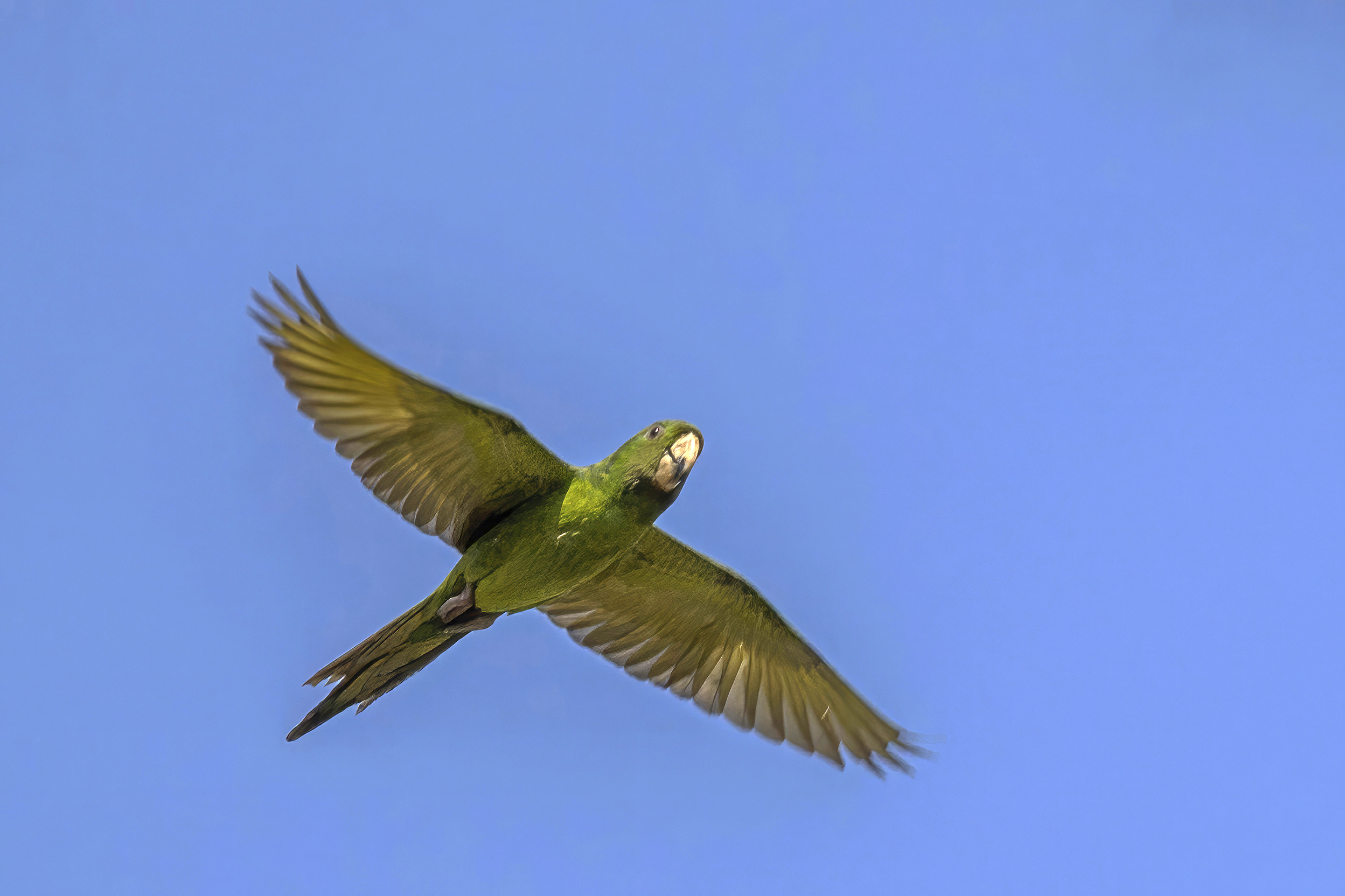
Pacific parakeet in flight

== Description ==
The Pacific parakeet is about 32 cm (13 in) long. The sexes are alike. Adults are generally olive green which is slightly yellowish on the underparts; some have red speckles on their neck. The undersides of their flight feathers and tail are olive-yellow. Their iris is orange-red surrounded by bare pale beige skin, their bill horn colored, and their legs and feet are brownish.

== Distribution and habitat ==
The Pacific parakeet is found on the Pacific slope from southern Mexico's Oaxaca state south through Guatemala, El Salvador, and Honduras into central Nicaragua. It inhabits a variety of woodland landscapes including deciduous, semi-deciduous, and evergreen; gallery forest; swamp forest; and arid scrublands. It also occurs in upland pine-oak forests and in urban parks and gardens. In elevation it ranges from sea level to 2,600 m (8,500 ft).

== Behavior ==
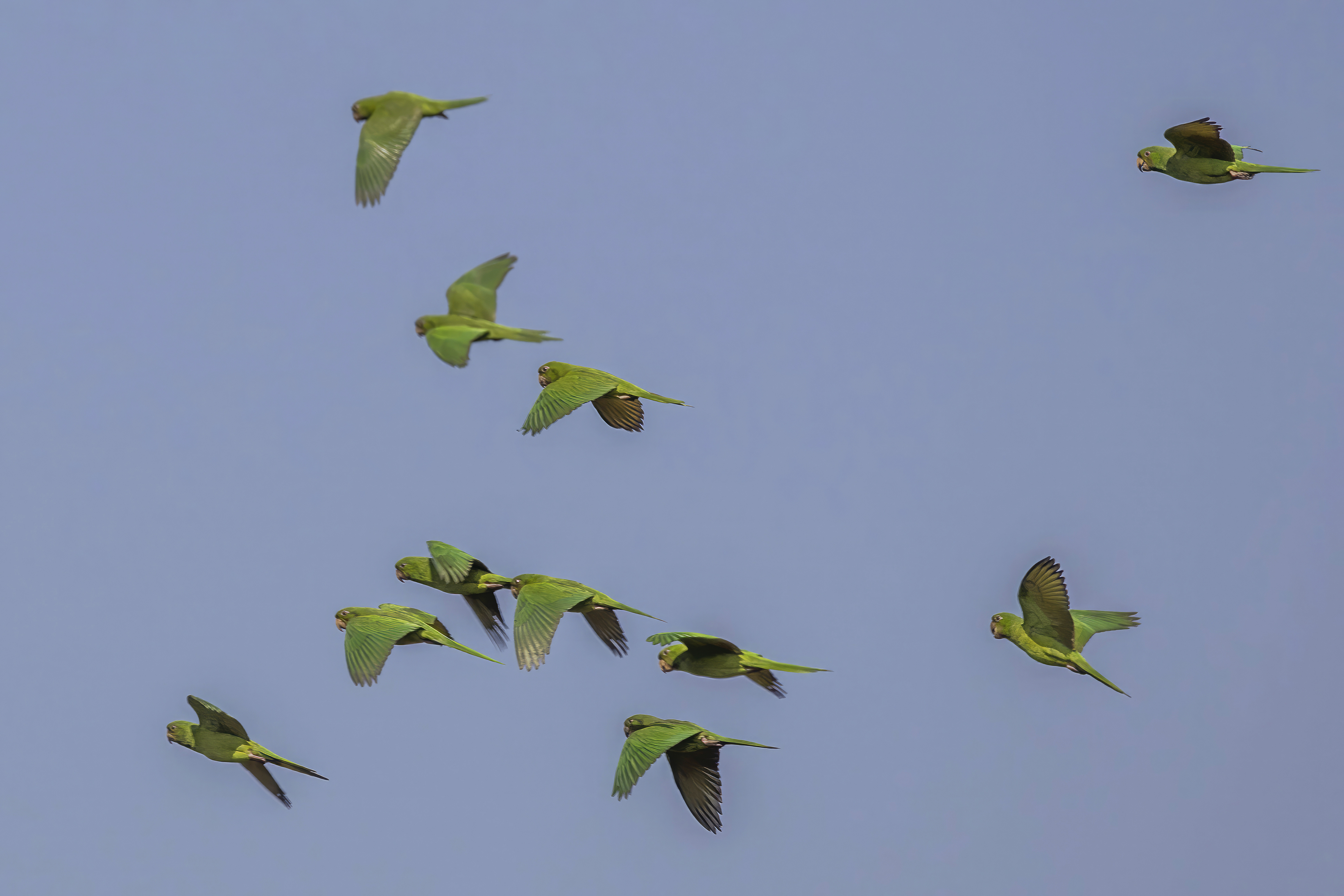
Parakeets in flight

=== Movement ===
The Pacific parakeet is non-migratory but makes local movements in response to food availability.

=== Feeding ===
The Pacific parakeet's diet has not been fully documented but it is known to include seed and fruits. It can be a crop pest. Flocks may exceed 100 individuals.

=== Breeding ===
The Pacific parakeet's breeding biology is not well known. It has been documented nesting in rock crevices and cavities in earthen banks; it probably also nests in cavities in trees and termitaria. Its breeding season appears to include June to September.

=== Vocalization ===
The Pacific parakeet's flight call is rendered as "kreh!-kreh!-kreh!-kreh!...". Its perched call is lower-pitched, "a scratchy kreeh-kreeh-kreeh-kreei-kreei".

== Status ==
The IUCN follows HBW taxonomy and so includes the Pacific parakeet in its assessment of the green parakeet as being of Least Concern. It is estimated that the combined population numbers about 200,000 mature individuals and is decreasing. No immediate threats have been identified. It is thought to be fairly numerous in parts of its range and occurs in at least two protected areas.
