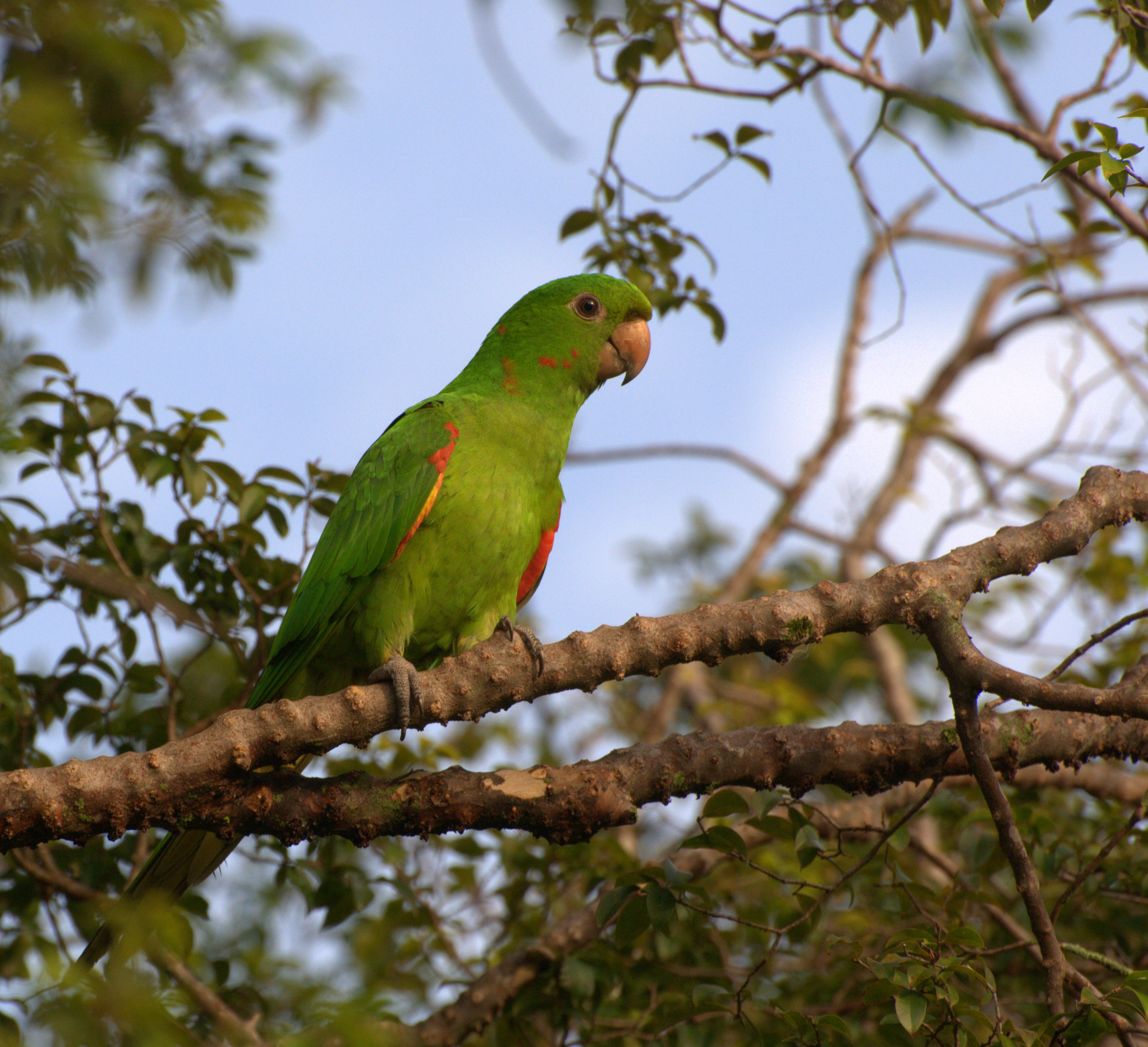
- In Piraju, Brazil

Conservation status
- Least Concern (IUCN 3.1)
- CITES Appendix II

Scientific classification
- Kingdom: Animalia
- Phylum: Chordata
- Class: Aves
- Order: Psittaciformes
- Family: Psittacidae
- Genus: Psittacara
- Species: P. leucophthalmus

Binomial name
- Psittacara leucophthalmus (Müller, PLS, 1776)

Synonyms
- Aratinga leucophthalmus; Aratinga leucophthalma

Audio
- Call of the white-eyed parakeet

= White-eyed parakeet =

Species of bird

The white-eyed parakeet (Psittacara leucophthalmus), known in aviculture as white-eyed conure, is a species of bird in the subfamily Arinae of the family Psittacidae, the African and New World parrots. It is found in every mainland South American country except Chile and also on Trinidad.

== Taxonomy and systematics ==
The white-eyed parakeet was for a time placed in the genus Aratinga but from about 2013 has been in its present genus Psittacara. It has these three subspecies:

- P. l. callogenys (Salvadori, 1891)
- P. l. leucophthalmus (Müller, P.L.S., 1776)
- P. l. nicefori (Meyer de Schauensee, 1946)

What is now Finsch's parakeet (P. finschi) was for a time treated as a fourth subspecies of white-eyed parakeet, and they now constitute a superspecies.

The white-eyed parakeet's specific epithet is derived from the Ancient Greek leukos "white" and ophthalmos "eye".

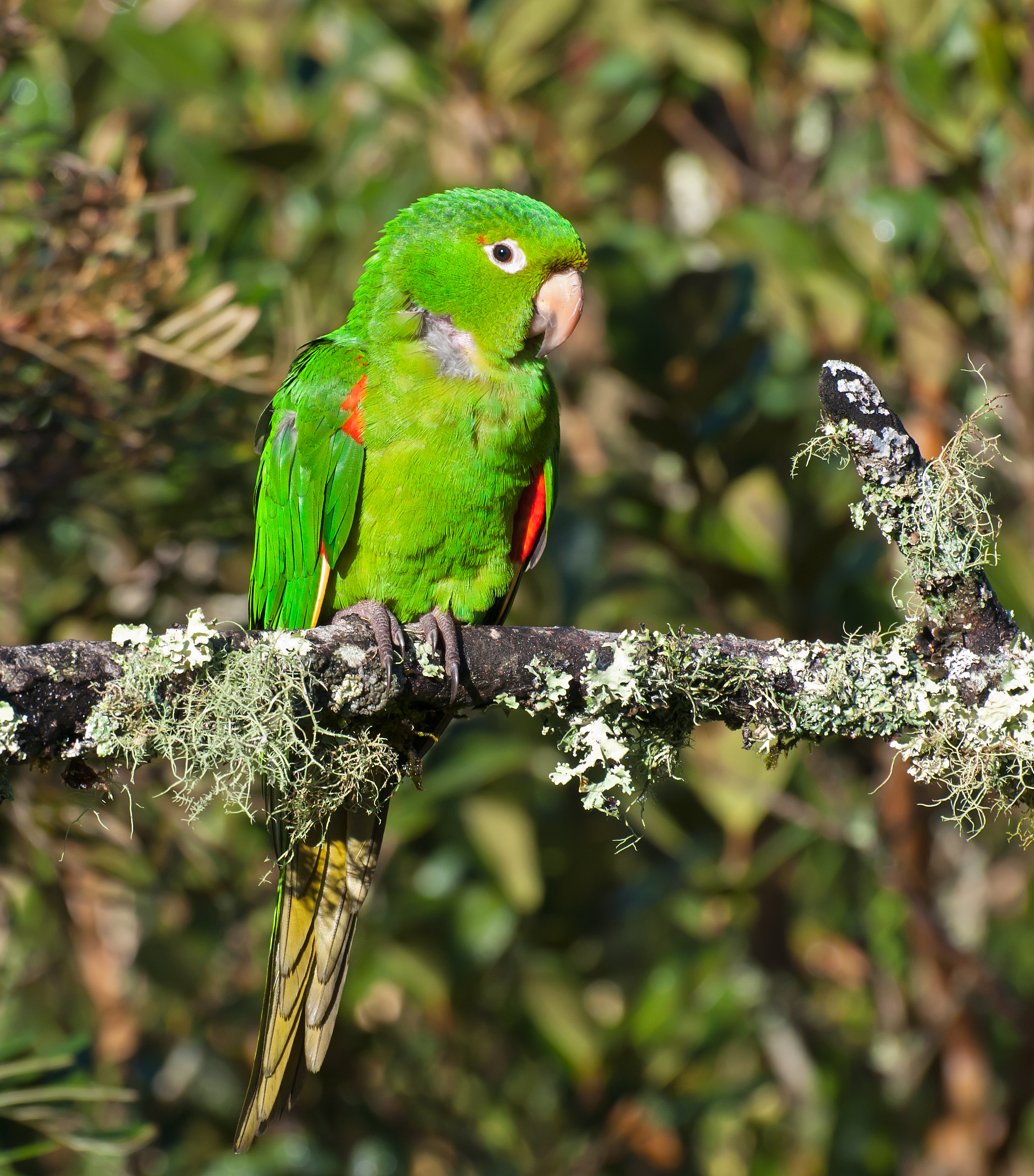
In Brazil

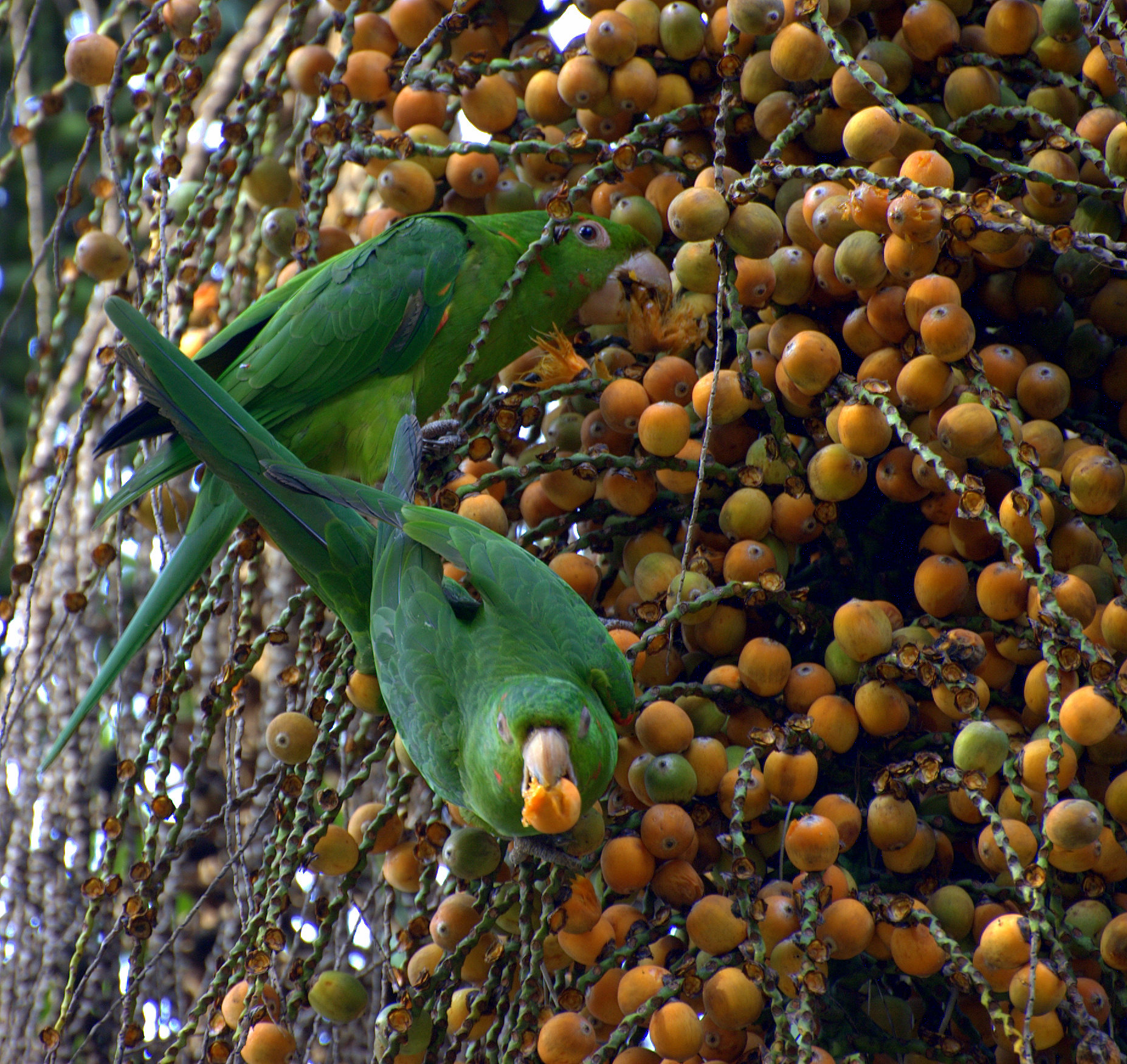
White-eyed parakeets feeding, apparently on queen palm fruit

== Description ==
The white-eyed parakeet is 32 to 35 cm (13 to 14 in) long with a 37 to 40 cm (15 to 16 in) wingspan. It weighs 100 to 218 g (3.5 to 7.7 oz). The sexes are alike. Adults of all subspecies are mostly green that is paler on their underparts. They have red flecks on their head and neck. The bend and edge of their wing and their outermost lesser underwing coverts are also red. Their outermost greater underwing coverts are yellow. The undersides of their flight feathers and tail are olive. Their eye is orange surrounded by bare white to yellowish white skin and their bill is horn colored. Subspecies P. l. callogenys is larger and darker green than the nominate P. l. leucophthalmus. Subspecies P. l. nicefori has a red band on its forehead. Juveniles resemble adults, but have little or no red on the head and wings.

== Distribution and habitat ==
The nominate subspecies of the white-eyed parakeet has the widest distribution. It is found in Trinidad, eastern Venezuela east through the Guianas, and south through Brazil into Bolivia, Paraguay, northern Argentina, and Uruguay. Its Brazilian range does not include the upper Amazon Basin or the dry northeastern part of the country. Subspecies P. l. callogenys is found in southeastern Colombia south through eastern Ecuador into northwestern Peru and east into the upper and central Amazon Basin south of the Amazon River. P. l. nicefori is known only from the type specimen that was collected in central Colombia.

The white-eyed parakeet inhabits a wide variety of landscapes, most of which are somewhat open. These include the edges of dense forests and nearby savannahs, secondary forests, gallery forests, várzea forests (especially in Ecuador), palm groves, mangroves, and clearings in rainforests. It is generally a bird of the lowlands, reaching 700 m (2,300 ft) in Colombia and 1,100 m (3,600 ft) in Ecuador but occurring as high as 2,500 m (8,200 ft) in Bolivia.

== Behavior ==
The white-eyed parakeet congregates in flocks that may number several hundred birds and include other parrot species. It roosts communally in trees and also in cane fields and caves.

=== Movement ===
The white-eyed parakeet is non-migratory but apparently roams in response to food availability.

=== Feeding ===
The white-eyed parakeet's diet is mostly fruit but also includes seeds, flowers, and small numbers of arthropods. It visits clay licks.

=== Breeding ===
The white-eyed parakeet's breeding season varies widely across its very large range. It nests in cavities in trees and palms. The clutch size is three to four eggs. In captivity, the incubation period is four weeks and fledging occurs nine weeks after hatch.

=== Vocalization ===
The white-eyed parakeet is very vocal, especially in flight with "a grating chattering interspersed with higher-pitched shrieks" described as "r'teet-r'teet-tiw-". It also makes "[s]harp squeaky notes and loud harsh calls" described as "scree-ah".

== Status ==
The IUCN has assessed the white-eyed parakeet as being of Least Concern. It has an extremely large range but its population size is not known and is believed to be decreasing. Large numbers have been exported or kept domestically in the pet trade but no immediate threats have been identified. It is considered common over much of its range, though less so at the northern and southern edges of it. It occurs in some protected areas.

== Aviculture ==
Though not as popular as some of the more colorful parakeets, the white-eyed parakeet can become a sweet, loving and talkative pet. They are seldom destructive and are generally not screamers, often choosing to mimic speech instead. Although many breeders ignore this species, those that do breed them appreciate their good parenting skills. Breeding requirements for white-eyed parakeets are much the same as for other parakeet species.

They will usually start to nest in March or April, sometimes breeding throughout the year and having four to six clutches. The clutch size is usually four eggs. Chicks will sometimes start to talk by the time they are weaned and generally will talk by six months of age.

White-eyed parakeets are sometimes confused with Finsch's parakeets because both have red and yellow epaulets under their wings. The white-eyed parakeets lack the red triangle on the forehead as adults. In captivity, they can live for 25–30 years.
