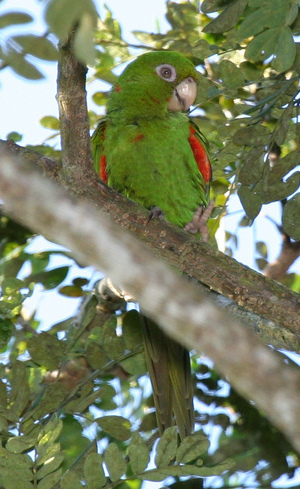

Conservation status
- Vulnerable (IUCN 3.1)
- CITES Appendix II

Scientific classification
- Kingdom: Animalia
- Phylum: Chordata
- Class: Aves
- Order: Psittaciformes
- Family: Psittacidae
- Genus: Psittacara
- Species: P. euops

Binomial name
- Psittacara euops (Wagler, 1832)

= Cuban parakeet =

Species of bird

The Cuban parakeet (Psittacara euops) is a Vulnerable species of bird in subfamily Arinae of the family Psittacidae, the African and New World parrots. It is endemic to the island of Cuba.

== Taxonomy and systematics ==
The Cuban parakeet was for a time placed in the genus Aratinga but from about 2013 has been in its present genus Psittacara. It is monotypic.

== Description ==
The Cuban parakeet is 22 to 29 cm (8.7 to 11 in) long and weighs 78 to 96 g (2.8 to 3.4 oz). The sexes are alike. Adults are mostly yellow-green that is paler on their underparts. They have red spots scattered on their head, neck, and breast; females have fewer than males. The edge of their wing and their underwing coverts are bright red. The undersides of their flight feathers and tail are pale green to olive. Their eye is light yellow surrounded by bare light pink to reddish white skin, their bill is light pink, and their feet are pink to ivory. Juveniles resemble adults, but have little or no red on the head and breast.

== Distribution and habitat ==
The Cuban parakeet formerly was found throughout the main island of Cuba and on Isla de la Juventud (Isle of Pines). It was extirpated from Isla de la Juventud by about 1900. In the 21st century it has a disjunct distribution in the Zapata Swamp; in parts of Villa Clara, Ciego de Ávila, Sancti Spíritus, Camagüey, and Guantanamo provinces; in the western Escambray Mountains; and in the Cauto River watershed.

The Cuban parakeet inhabits two quite different landscapes. One is savannas with many palms and isolated trees. The other is evergreen and semi-deciduous montane forest. Royal palm is present in both landscapes and is the species' preferred nest substrate.

== Behavior ==
The Cuban parakeet is very social and is usually seen in flocks that may number up to about 50 individuals.

=== Movement ===
The Cuban parakeet is not migratory.

=== Feeding ===
The Cuban parakeet's diet includes seeds, fruits (both green and ripe), and flower buds, pollen, and nectar. More than 50 species of plants have been documented as sources.

=== Breeding ===
The Cuban parakeet nests between February and September. Almost all nests are in holes excavated by woodpeckers though cavities in limestone cliffs are also used. No material is added to the substrate though in trees and palms the adults may loosen chips from the inner walls to line the bottom of the cavity. The clutch size is two to five eggs with an average of four. The incubation period is about 24 days and fledging occurs 55 to 60 days after hatch. The male brings food to the nest for the female which in turn feeds the nestlings.

=== Vocalization ===
The Cuban parakeet has a variety of vocalizations. Its "warning calls" in response to a predator are "more metallic than scraping; they can be described as erh, erh, erh, erh." Its "contact call" is used while feeding and is described as "kkkkeeeeerrrrrrrrrrrrrr". It also makes a "flight contact" call, usually when taking off and landing; it is similar to the warning call. "Courtship calls" are "smooth and short...and sound like keirp-keirp-keirp."

== Status ==
The IUCN originally assessed the Cuban parakeet as Threatened but since 1994 has rated it as Vulnerable. It has a small and fragmented range and its estimated population of 1500 to 7000 mature individuals is believed to be decreasing. Continuing habitat loss and illegal trapping for the domestic and export cage bird trade are the principal threats. The increasing frequency and intensity of hurricanes attributed to climate change is a potential additional threat. Cuban authorities have recommended that the IUCN rating be changed to Endangered. Most of the remaining populations are in somewhat protected areas.
