= Ilex socorroensis =

Conservation status
- Critically Endangered (IUCN 3.1)

Scientific classification
- Kingdom: Plantae
- Clade: Tracheophytes
- Clade: Angiosperms
- Clade: Eudicots
- Clade: Asterids
- Order: Aquifoliales
- Family: Aquifoliaceae
- Genus: Ilex
- Species: I. socorroensis

Binomial name
- Ilex socorroensis Brandegee (1910)

Species of flowering plant

Ilex socorroensis is a species of flowering plant in the holly genus (Ilex). It is a tree native to Socorro Island in the Revillagigedo Islands west of Mexico's Pacific coast. It is a small tree, growing up to 8 meters tall.

It grows from 50 to 950 meters elevation on Socorro. At high elevations it is the dominant canopy tree in Ilex socorroensis forest. Other forest canopy trees include Guettarda insularis, Sideroxylon socorrense, and Psidium oligospermum. At middle elevations it grows in dry forest and shrubland. The population is small, estimated at 2,500 mature individuals. It is threatened by habitat loss, mostly from overgrazing by introduced sheep, cattle, and goats, which destroys native vegetation and accelerates soil erosion.
