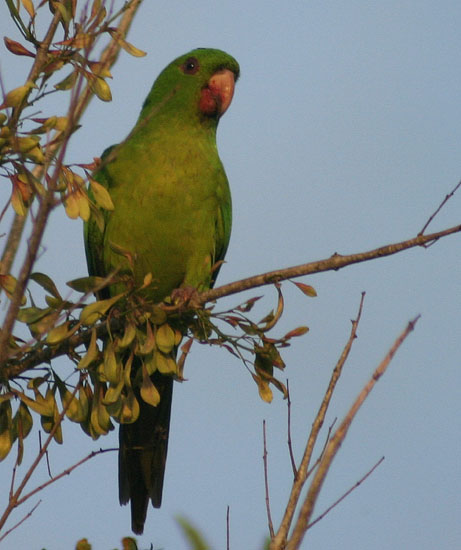
- Nominate subspecies in South Texas, United States

Conservation status
- Least Concern (IUCN 3.1)
- CITES Appendix II

Scientific classification
- Kingdom: Animalia
- Phylum: Chordata
- Class: Aves
- Order: Psittaciformes
- Family: Psittacidae
- Genus: Psittacara
- Species: P. holochlorus

Binomial name
- Psittacara holochlorus (Sclater, PL, 1859)
- Range of green parakeet sensu lato including the Socorro and Pacific parakeets (See the Taxonomy section)

= Green parakeet =

Green parakeet Temporal range: Pleistocene - Present

Species of bird

The green parakeet (Psittacara holochlorus), green conure, or Mexican green conure is a New World parrot. As defined by the International Ornithological Committee (IOC), it is native to Mexico and southern Texas in the Rio Grande Valley.

== Taxonomy and systematics ==
The green parakeet was formally described in 1859 by the English zoologist Philip Sclater under the binomial name Conurus holochlorus based on a specimen that had been collected near the town of Xalapa in the state Veracruz of southern Mexico. The specific epithet holochlorus is from Classical Greek ὁλοχλωρος/holokhlōros meaning "all-green" or "all-yellow". The green parakeet was formerly placed in the genus Aratinga, but is now one of 12 species placed in the resurrected genus Psittacara that was introduced in 1825 by the Irish zoologist Nicholas Aylward Vigors.

Three subspecies are recognised:

- P. h. brewsteri (Nelson, 1928) – northwest Mexico
- P. h. holochlorus (Sclater, PL, 1859) – east, south Mexico
- P. h. rubritorquis (Sclater, PL, 1887) – south Guatemala, Honduras and north Nicaragua

The subspecies P. h. rubritorquis has sometimes been considered as a separate species, the red-throated parakeet.

The Socorro parakeet (Psittacara brevipes) was formerly considered as a subspecies. The green parakeet was for a time placed in the genus Aratinga as A. holochlora but from about 2013 has been in its present genus Psittacara.

== Description ==
The green parakeet is 28 to 30.5 cm (11 to 12 in) long and weighs about 230 g (8.1 oz). The sexes are alike. Adults of both subspecies are generally green that is paler and yellower on their underparts. Their cheeks and throat have variable amounts of red speckles. Their underwing coverts are yellowish green and the undersides of their flight feathers and tail are olive-yellow. Their iris is orange-red surrounded by bare pale beige skin, their bill horn colored, and their legs and feet brownish. The subspecies P. h. brewsteri is overall somewhat darker than the nominate and has a slight glaucous cast on its head.

== Distribution and habitat ==
The nominate subspecies of the green parakeet is native in eastern Mexico from Nuevo León and Tamaulipas south to Veracruz. The subspecies P. h. brewsteri is in the northwestern Mexican states of Sonora, Sinaloa, and Chihuahua. In the United States, the species is established in the lower Rio Grande Valley of Texas; that sub-population's origin is unknown but could be derived from introduced individuals or by natural dispersion. Sightings in California, Florida, and New Mexico are believed to be of escaped or released cage birds and the species is not on those states' lists.

In its native range, the green parakeet inhabits semi-open landscapes including deciduous woodland, gallery forest, and scrublands. It shuns humid lowland forest and is typically found at elevations between 500 and 2,000 m (1,600 and 6,600 ft). In Texas it is also found in cities and towns.

== Behavior ==
The green parakeet is non-migratory but makes local movements in response to food availability.

Its diet has not been fully documented but is known to include seed and fruits. It can be a crop pest.

The breeding season has not been defined but appears to include at least January to April. It nests in tree cavities, caves, and cliff faces. The clutch size is four eggs. The incubation period is thought to be 23 days; the time to fledging and details of parental care are not known.

Its variety of vocalizations include "sharp squeaky notes", "loud harsh calls", and "shrill noisy chattering". Its flight call is "a rolling, harsh and high pitched screek...screek."

== Status ==
The IUCN follows the HBW taxonomy and so includes the Socorro and Pacific parakeets in its assessment of the green parakeet as being of Least Concern. It has estimated that the combined population numbers about 200,000 mature individuals and is decreasing. No immediate threats to the Mexican population have been identified. NatureServe considers the species Vulnerable in Texas due to hunting pressure.
