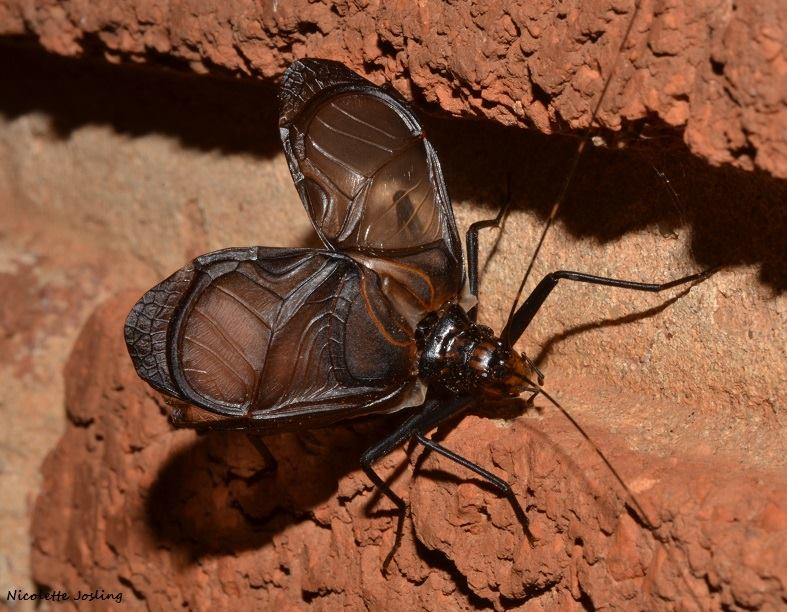

Scientific classification
- Domain: Eukaryota
- Kingdom: Animalia
- Phylum: Arthropoda
- Class: Insecta
- Order: Orthoptera
- Suborder: Ensifera
- Family: Phalangopsidae
- Subfamily: Cachoplistinae
- Tribe: Homoeogryllini
- Genus: Homoeogryllus
- Species: H. orientalis

Binomial name
- Homoeogryllus orientalis (Desutter-Grandcolas, 1985)

= Homoeogryllus orientalis =

South African bell cricket

South African bell cricket

Homoeogryllus orientalis (Desutter-Grandcolas, 1985), the South African bell cricket, is a species in the tribe Homoeogryllini of the subfamily Cachoplistinae. The species is reported from southern tropical Africa including parts of Mozambique and South Africa. Within South Africa it has been reported south of the tropics in the Bushveld and in the Free State.

== Song ==
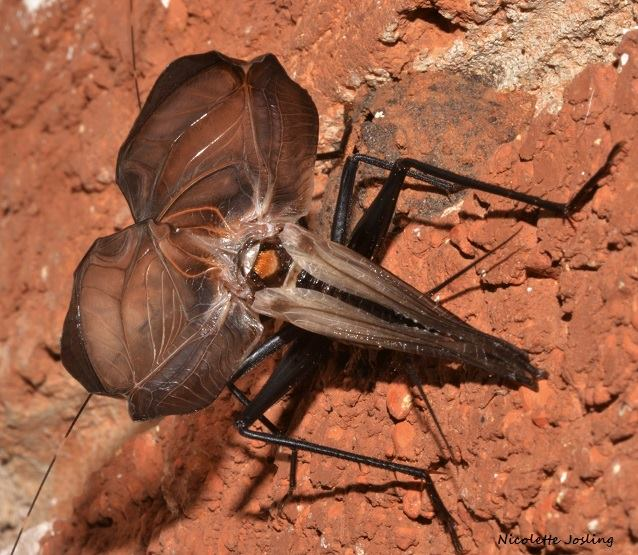
Homoeogryllus orientalis as seen from behind, showing the hind wings folded out of the way as the male produces its song. Note the reinforcing veins and folds in the fore wings. Note also the fold opening from the leading (lower) edge of the forewing and acting to direct the sound outwards.

Recordings show that the male song of Homoeogryllus orientalis is almost identical to that of the related species Homoeogryllus reticulatus from the coast of tropical West Africa. Recordings of presumed orientalis in the wild in South Africa also are consistent. There is however no question of the two populations being of the same species, because there are marked differences between their genitalia.
