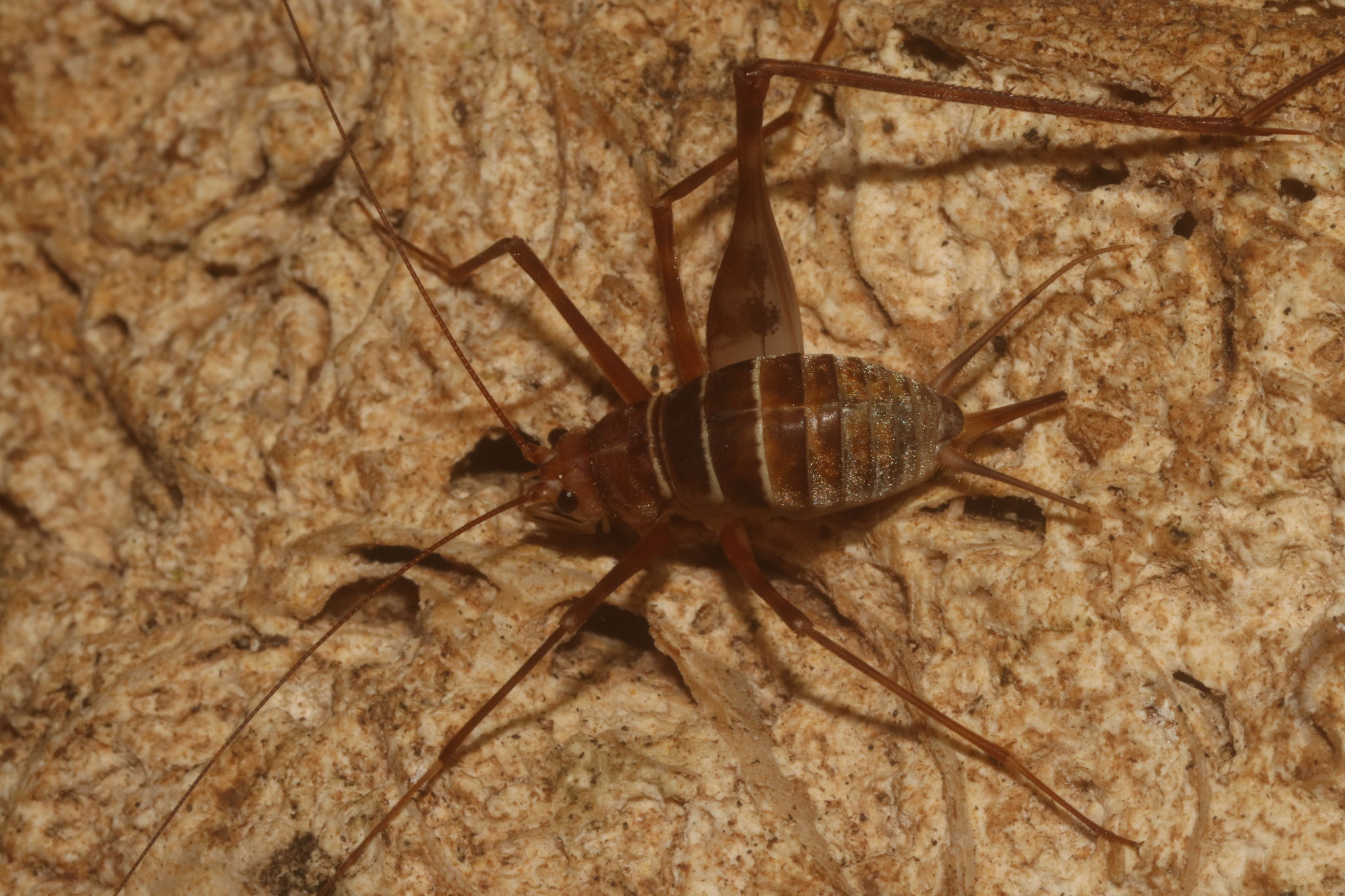
- Mayagryllus yucatanus

Scientific classification
- Kingdom: Animalia
- Phylum: Arthropoda
- Class: Insecta
- Order: Orthoptera
- Suborder: Ensifera
- Superfamily: Grylloidea
- Family: Phalangopsidae
- Subfamily: Luzarinae; Hebard, 1928

Subtribes
- See text

= Luzarinae =

Subfamily of Phalangopsidae crickets

Luzarinae is a subfamily of crickets in the family Phalangopsidae.

== Subdivisions ==
The Orthoptera Species File lists the following taxonomy for Luzarinae:

- subtribe Amphiacustina Hubbell, 1938
  - Amphiacusta Saussure, 1874
  - Arachnopsita Desutter-Grandcolas & Hubbell, 1993
  - †Araneagryllus Heads, 2010
  - Cantrallia Desutter-Grandcolas, 1994
  - Caribacusta Gorochov, 2014
  - Leptopedetes Desutter-Grandcolas, 1994
  - Longuripes Desutter-Grandcolas & Hubbell, 1993
  - Mayagryllus Desutter-Grandcolas & Hubbell, 1993
  - Nemoricantor Desutter-Grandcolas & Hubbell, 1993
  - Noctivox Desutter-Grandcolas & Hubbell, 1993
- subtribe Lernecina Desutter-Grandcolas, 1987
  - Lerneca Walker, 1869
  - Lernecopsis de Mello, 1995
  - Microlerneca de Mello, 1995
  - Prosthacusta Saussure, 1874
- subtribe Luzarina Hebard, 1928
  - Acantoluzarida Desutter-Grandcolas, 1992
  - Allochrates Desutter-Grandcolas, 1993
  - Amazonacla Gorochov, 2011
  - Amusina Hebard, 1928
  - Amusodes Hebard, 1928
  - Dyscophogryllus Rehn, 1901
  - Gryllosoma Hebard, 1928
  - Koilenoma Desutter-Grandcolas, 1993
  - Lecticusta Cadena-Castañeda & García García, 2012
  - Leptopsis Desutter-Grandcolas, 1996
  - Luzara Walker, 1869
  - Luzarida Hebard, 1928
  - Luzaridella Desutter-Grandcolas, 1992
  - Megalamusus Hebard, 1928
  - Melanotes Desutter-Grandcolas, 1993
  - Niquirana Hebard, 1928
  - Ochraperites Desutter-Grandcolas, 1993
  - Palpigera Hebard, 1928
  - Peru Koçak & Kemal, 2008
  - Peruzara Gorochov, 2011
  - Rehniella Hebard, 1928
  - Tairona Hebard, 1928
  - Ucayacla Gorochov, 2011
- genus group Aracambiae Souza-Dias & Desutter-Grandcolas, 2014
  - Aracamby de Mello, 1992
  - Cacruzia de Mello, 1992
  - Desutterella Souza-Dias, Campos & de Mello, 2017
  - Izecksohniella de Mello, 1992
  - Marcgraviella Souza-Dias & Desutter-Grandcolas, 2014
  - Marliella Mews & Mól, 2009
  - Vanzoliniella de Mello & Cezar dos Reis, 1994
- genera without subtribe or other placement
  - Adenopygus Bolfarini & de Mello, 2012
  - Anacusta Hebard, 1928
  - Bambuina de Mello, Horta & Bolfarini, 2013
  - Cophella Hebard, 1928
  - Grandcolasia Koçak & Kemal, 2010
  - Guabamima de Mello, 1993
  - Joadis Mews & Sperber, 2009
  - Mellomima Desutter-Grandcolas, 2020
  - Mellopsis Mews & Sperber, 2010
  - Miogryllodes Hebard, 1928
  - Ottedana de Mello & de Andrade, 2003
  - Paracophella Hebard, 1928
  - Pizacris Souza-Dias & Desutter-Grandcolas, 2015
  - Prosthama Hebard, 1928
  - Saopauloa Koçak & Kemal, 2008
  - Sishiniheia de Mello & Souza-Dias, 2016
  - Strinatia Chopard, 1970
