= Aracamby =

Scientific classification
- Domain: Eukaryota
- Kingdom: Animalia
- Phylum: Arthropoda
- Class: Insecta
- Order: Orthoptera
- Suborder: Ensifera
- Family: Phalangopsidae
- Subfamily: Luzarinae
- Genus: Aracamby de Mello, 1992

Species
- See text

Genus of Phalangopsidae crickets

Aracamby is a genus of crickets in the family Phalangopsidae, native to the Atlantic coastal forest of Brazil. Unusually for crickets, they appear to not provide paternal investments to their mates.

== Species ==
Currently accepted species include:

- Aracamby balneatorius de Mello, 1992
- Aracamby mucuriensis de Mello, 1992
- Aracamby picinguabensis de Mello, 1992
