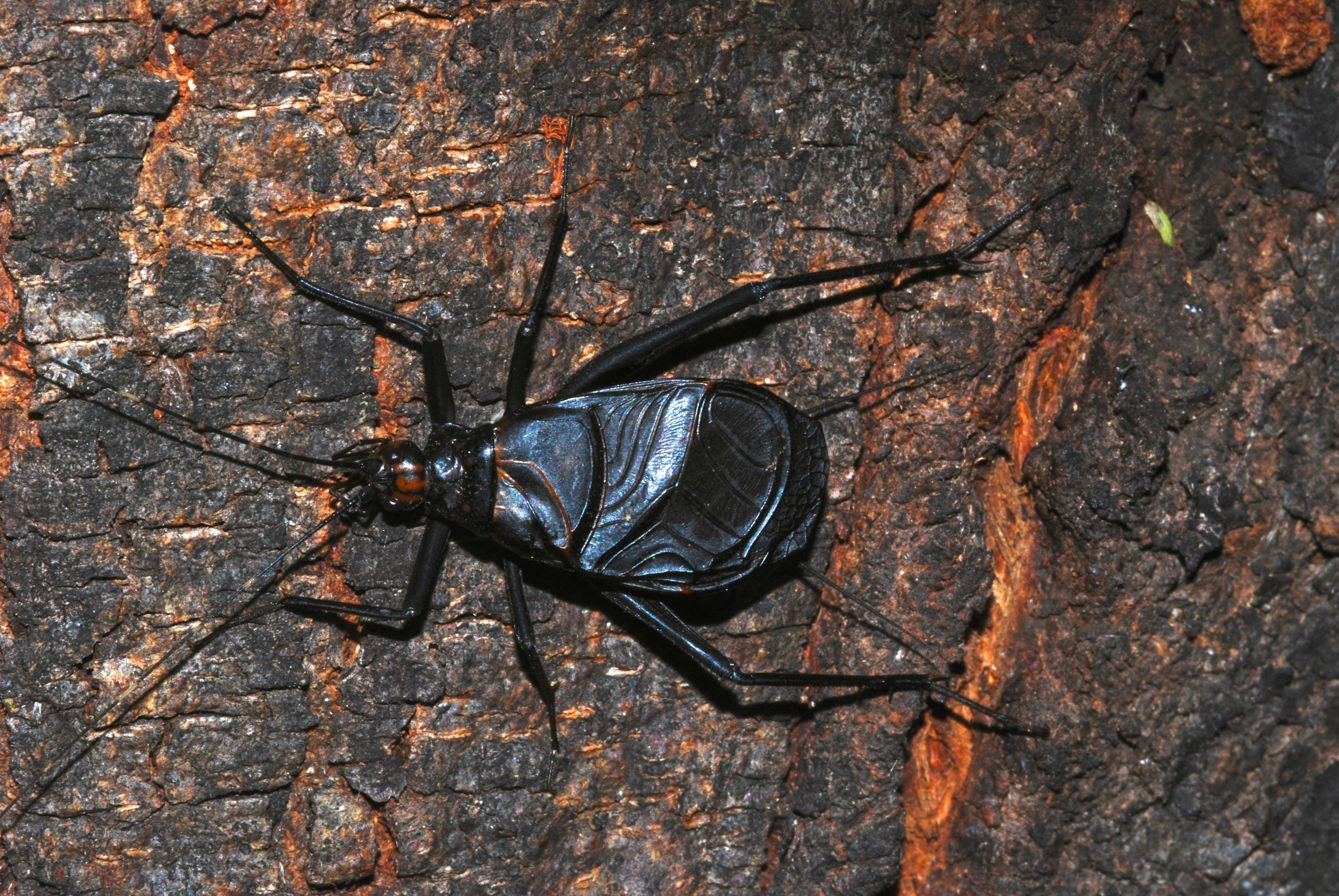
- Homoeogryllus orientalis male

Scientific classification
- Domain: Eukaryota
- Kingdom: Animalia
- Phylum: Arthropoda
- Class: Insecta
- Order: Orthoptera
- Suborder: Ensifera
- Family: Phalangopsidae
- Subfamily: Cachoplistinae
- Tribe: Homoeogryllini
- Genus: Homoeogryllus; Guérin-Méneville, 1847

Synonyms
- Homaeogryllus Guérin-Méneville, 1847

= Homoeogryllus =

Genus of crickets

Homoeogryllus is a genus of cricket in the subfamily Cachoplistinae and tribe Homoeogryllini. The recorded distribution is: Africa and Peninsular Malaysia.

== Species ==
Some species, previously placed here are now in the genus Meloimorpha. The Orthoptera Species File lists:

- Homoeogryllus adunctus Gorochov, 1988
- Homoeogryllus ambo Gorochov, 2018
- Homoeogryllus cavicola Chopard, 1950
- Homoeogryllus deviatus Desutter-Grandcolas, 1985
- Homoeogryllus gabonensis Desutter-Grandcolas, 1985
- Homoeogryllus longicornis (Walker, 1869)
- Homoeogryllus lyristes Gorochov, 1988
- Homoeogryllus maroccanus Desutter-Grandcolas, 1985
- Homoeogryllus nigresculus Desutter-Grandcolas, 1985
- Homoeogryllus nigripennis Chopard, 1942
- Homoeogryllus orientalis Desutter-Grandcolas, 1985
- Homoeogryllus parvus Chopard, 1936
- Homoeogryllus reticulatus (Fabricius, 1781)
- Homoeogryllus tessellatus (Serville, 1838)
- Homoeogryllus venosus Saussure, 1878
- Homoeogryllus xanthographus Guérin-Méneville, 1847 – type species (as Homaeogryllus xanthographus)

== Species ==
Some species in this genus has been kept as pet since antiquity in some China and Japan for the song they produce.
