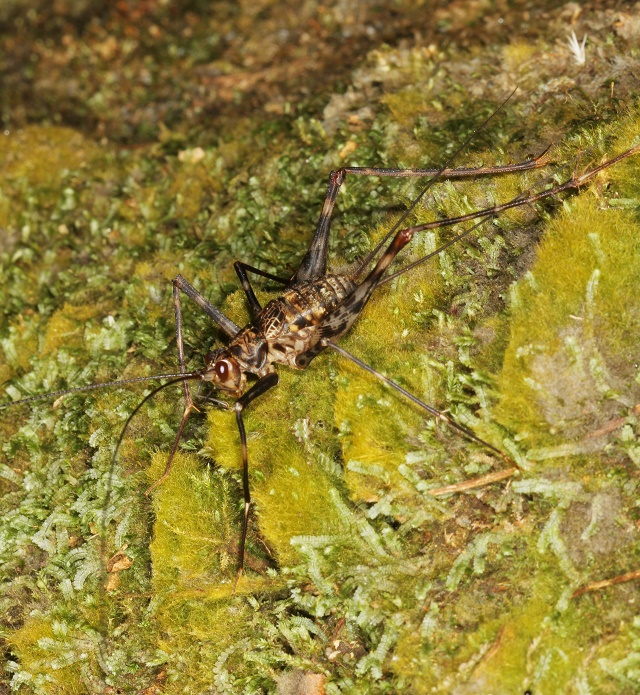

Conservation status
- Critically Endangered (IUCN 3.1)

Scientific classification
- Domain: Eukaryota
- Kingdom: Animalia
- Phylum: Arthropoda
- Class: Insecta
- Order: Orthoptera
- Suborder: Ensifera
- Family: Phalangopsidae
- Genus: Phalangacris
- Species: P. alluaudi

Binomial name
- Phalangacris alluaudi Bolivar, 1895

= Mahé boulder cricket =

Species of cricket-like animal

The Mahé boulder cricket (Phalangacris alluaudi) is an insect species endemic to Mahé island in Seychelles. This species of cricket is only found in two localities, the Morne Seychellois National Park and "La Reserve". The species had not been recorded since 1909, until its rediscovery in 2014. It is a restricted range species, with an area of occupancy less than 10 square kilometres (3.9 sq mi) and with a very fragmented population.

This species of boulder cricket is flightless and only found in caves and under large boulders. The population is assumed to be declining due to the deterioration of its habitat, threatened by the invasion of alien plants species like Cinnamomum verum and Clidemia hirta.

Axel Hochkirch, co-chair of the IUCN’s Grasshopper Specialist Group has said, “We have no idea how many individuals exist in total. Insect populations can be quite large in a small area. The problem with many insect populations is that [they are found in] small areas which can rapidly be destroyed by humans, so that even a large population can disappear rapidly.” The IUCN specialist group intends to publish a field guide to identify different species of the order Orthoptera, that includes crickets and grasshoppers; of the islands of Seychelles to assist local conservationists.
