= Trellius =

Scientific classification
- Domain: Eukaryota
- Kingdom: Animalia
- Phylum: Arthropoda
- Class: Insecta
- Order: Orthoptera
- Suborder: Ensifera
- Family: Phalangopsidae
- Subfamily: Phaloriinae
- Genus: Trellius; Gorochov, 1988

Genus of crickets

External image
- Images at iNaturalist

Trellius is an Asian genus of crickets (Orthoptera: Ensifera) in the family Phalangopsidae, subfamily Phaloriinae, tribe Phaloriini.

Species can be found in southern China, Indo-China and Malesia.

== Species ==
The Orthoptera Species File lists:

- subgenus Diatrellius Gorochov, 2003
  - Trellius abbreviates Gorochov, 2003
- subgenus Neotrellius Gorochov, 1992
  - Trellius logunovi Gorochov, 2018
  - Trellius simulator Gorochov, 2018
  - Trellius tonkinensis (Chopard, 1925)
  - Trellius yunnanensis Ma & Jing, 2018
- subgenus Protrellius Gorochov, 1996
  - Trellius aequatorialis Gorochov, 2003
  - Trellius barisan Gorochov, 2010
  - Trellius buqueti (Serville, 1838)
  - Trellius curup Gorochov, 2010
  - Trellius dulcis Gorochov, 1996
  - Trellius duplicatus Gorochov, 1999
  - Trellius electus Gorochov, 1999
  - Trellius elenae Gorochov, 2011
  - Trellius helverseni (Heller, 1985)
  - Trellius kerinci Gorochov, 2003
  - Trellius lampung Gorochov, 2010
  - Trellius michaili Gorochov, 2011
  - Trellius neesoon Gorochov & Tan, 2012
  - Trellius palawani Gorochov, 2004
  - Trellius perbonus Gorochov, 1999
  - Trellius siveci Gorochov, 1996
  - Trellius suspectus Gorochov, 1999
- subgenus Trellius Gorochov, 1988
  - Trellius alius Gorochov, 1992
  - Trellius certus Gorochov, 1992
  - Trellius deminutus Gorochov, 1990
  - Trellius detersus Gorochov, 1999
  - Trellius guangdongensis Ma & Jing, 2018
  - Trellius inquisitor Gorochov, 2010
  - Trellius jacobsoni (Chopard, 1925)
  - Trellius lithophilus Gorochov, 1990
  - Trellius orlovi Gorochov, 1999
  - Trellius riparius Gorochov, 1990
  - Trellius verus Gorochov, 1992
  - Trellius vitalisi (Chopard, 1925) – type species: as Heterotrypus vitalisi Chopard
- subgenus Vescelotrellius Gorochov, 1999
  - Trellius excellens Gorochov, 1999
  - Trellius fallens Gorochov, 1999
- subgenus Zatrellius Gorochov, 1999
  - Trellius andamanensis Gorochov, 2003
  - Trellius communis Gorochov, 1999
  - Trellius crocker Gorochov, 2018
  - Trellius kinabalu Gorochov, 2018
  - Trellius tawau Gorochov, 2018
