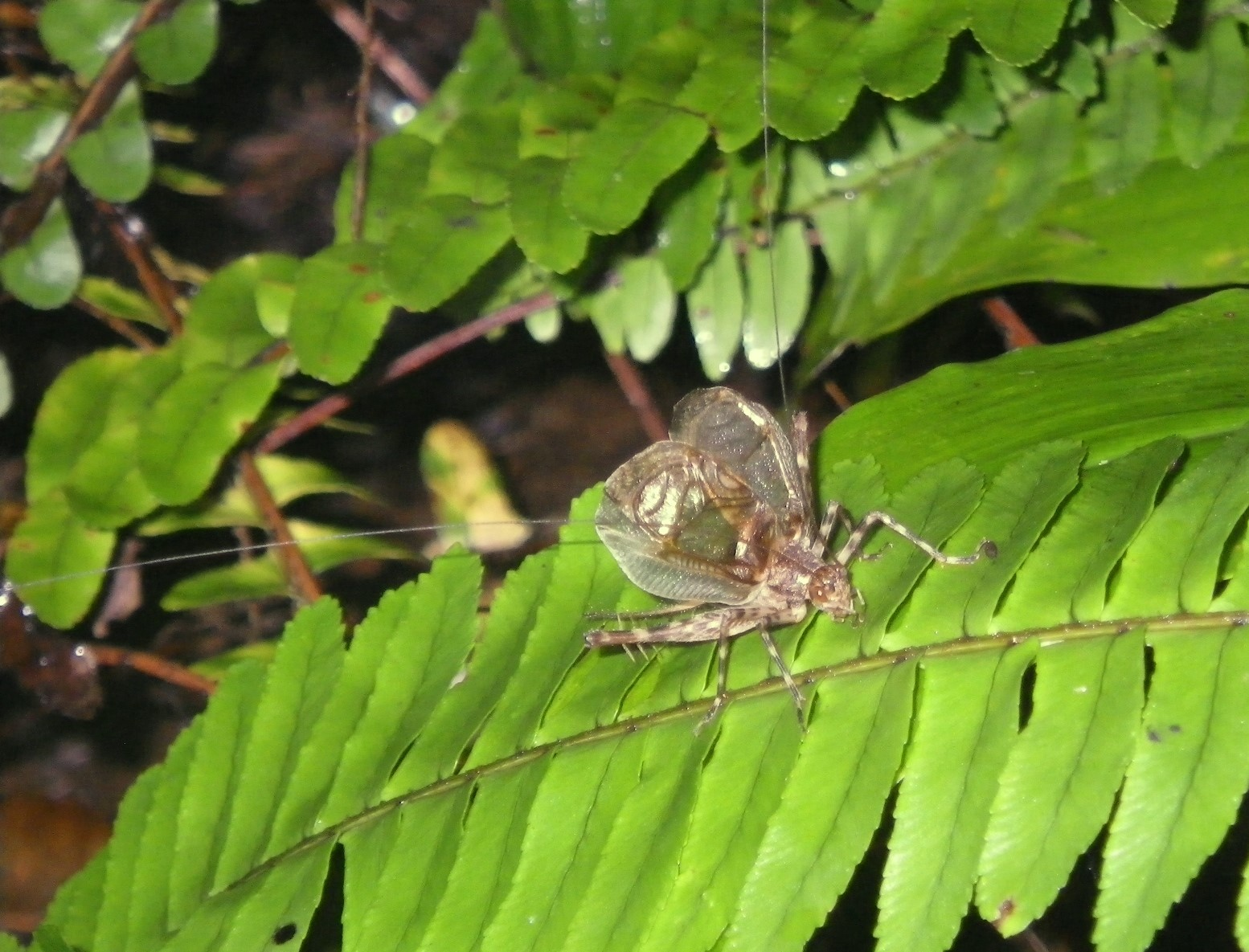
- Vescelia pieli ryukyuensis

Scientific classification
- Kingdom: Animalia
- Phylum: Arthropoda
- Class: Insecta
- Order: Orthoptera
- Suborder: Ensifera
- Family: Phalangopsidae
- Subfamily: Phaloriinae
- Genus: Vescelia; Stål, 1877

= Vescelia =

Genus of crickets

External image
- Images at iNaturalist

Vescelia is a genus of crickets (Orthoptera: Ensifera) in the family Phalangopsidae, subfamily Phaloriinae, tribe Phaloriini. Species have been found in: Japan, China, Vietnam, Borneo and the Philippines.

== Species ==
The Orthoptera Species File lists:

1. Vescelia dulcis He, 2019
2. Vescelia infumata Stål, 1877 - type species (locality: Philippines)
3. Vescelia moorei Chopard, 1940
4. Vescelia mulu Gorochov, 2014
5. Vescelia picta Chopard, 1932
6. Vescelia pieli Chopard, 1939 (4 subspecies)
7. Vescelia sepilokensis Tan, Gorochov, Japir & Chung, 2019
8. Vescelia variegata Chopard, 1937
