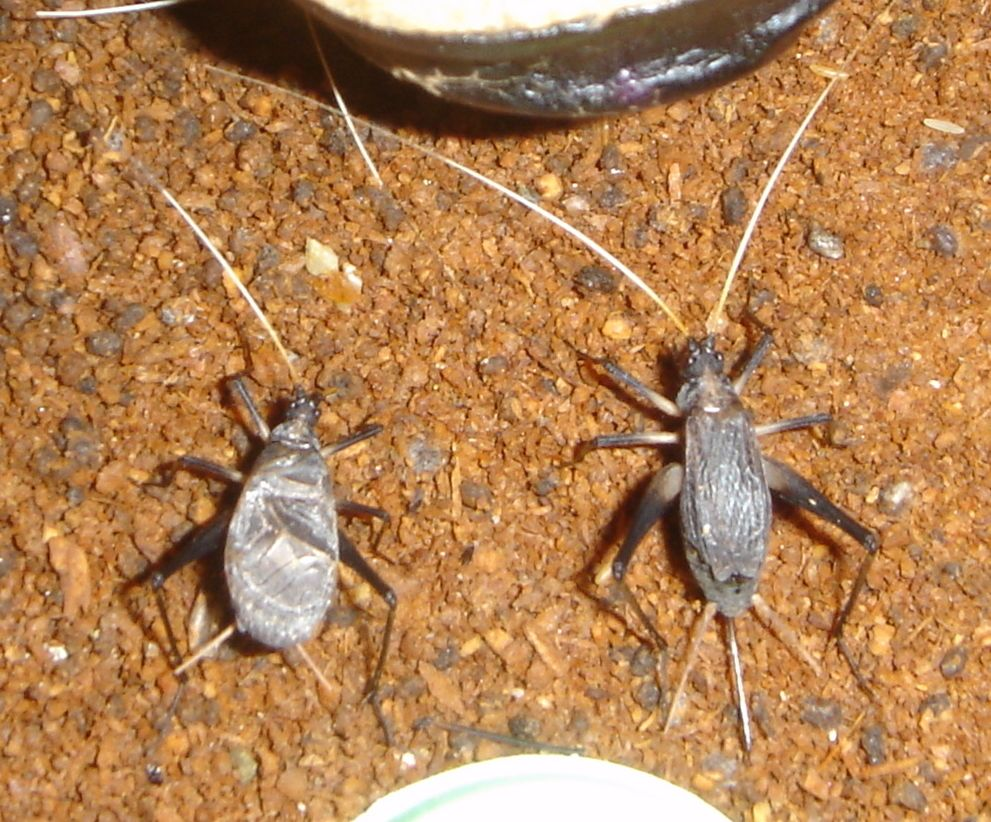

Scientific classification
- Kingdom: Animalia
- Phylum: Arthropoda
- Clade: Pancrustacea
- Class: Insecta
- Order: Orthoptera
- Suborder: Ensifera
- Family: Phalangopsidae
- Genus: Meloimorpha
- Species: M. japonica

Binomial name
- Meloimorpha japonica (Haan, 1844)

Synonyms
- Homoeogryllus japonicus (Haan, 1844)

Audio
- Meloimorpha japonica chirping song

= Meloimorpha japonica =

Species of cricket

Meloimorpha japonica, also known as suzumushi (鈴虫, lit. 'bell bug'), the bell cricket, and the bell-ring cricket, is a species of cricket widespread in Asia (from India, through Indochina to Japan). It is known particularly for its chiming song in Japan, where they are often kept as pets.

== Description ==
Meloimorpha japonica range from approximately 17 to 25 mm in length and have wide wings which are shaped like melon seeds.

=== Subspecies ===
The Orthoptera Species File lists two subspecies:

- Meloimorpha japonica japonica (Haan, 1844) - Japan: found in Hokkaido (though not natively), Honshu, Shikoku, and Kyushu.
- Meloimorpha japonica yunnanensis (Yin, 1998) - from southern China and Vietnam.

== In Japanese literature ==
Meloimorpha japonica is an autumn kigo (season word) used in haiku.

Suzumushi is the title of chapter 38 of The Tale of Genji, authored by Murasaki Shikibu. For unknown reasons, it is the only chapter skipped in Arthur Waley's translation of the book.

In the 1962 novel The Old Capital by Yasunari Kawabata, they are kept as pets by the main character, Chieko Sada, and are mentioned several times.
