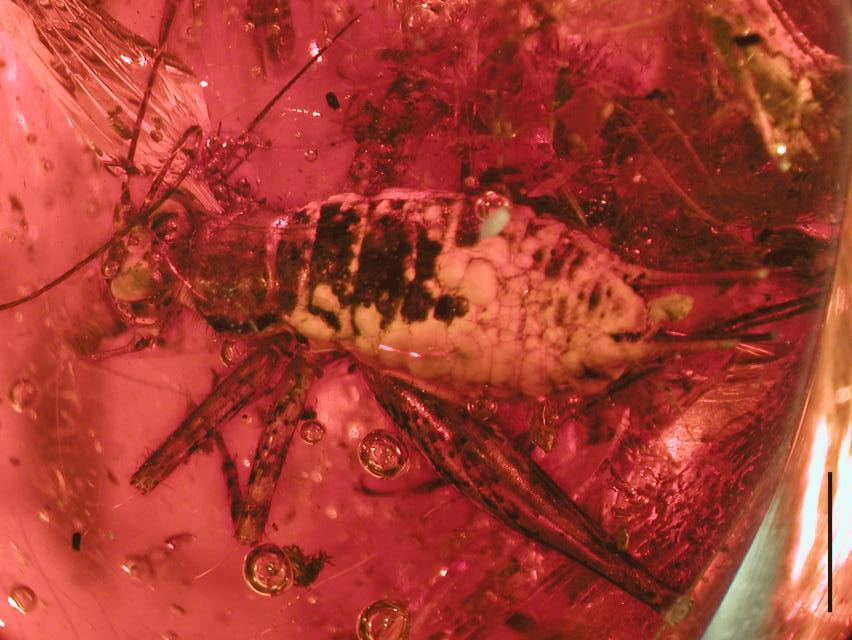
- A. dylani holotype female

Scientific classification
- Kingdom: Animalia
- Phylum: Arthropoda
- Class: Insecta
- Order: Orthoptera
- Suborder: Ensifera
- Family: Phalangopsidae
- Genus: †Araneagryllus; Heads, 2010
- Species: †A. dylani

Binomial name
- †Araneagryllus dylani Heads, 2010

= Araneagryllus =

Araneagryllus Temporal range: Burdigalian

Extinct genus of crickets

Araneagryllus is an extinct monotypic genus of cricket in the subfamily Phalangopsinae with the sole species Araneagryllus dylani. The fossil was recovered in the Dominican Republic from early Miocene Burdigalian stage Dominican amber deposits on the island of Hispaniola. Araneagryllus is the first Phalangopsinae cricket to be described from the fossil record.

The genus is known from a single 12.11 millimetres (0.477 in) long female specimen, the holotype, currently deposited in the collections of the American Museum of Natural History in New York City, as number "DR-12-32", and which was first studied by Dr. Sam W. Heads. Dr. Heads published his 2010 type description in the Zoological Journal of the Linnean Society volume number 158. The genus name is a combination of the Latin aranea meaning "spider" and gryllus, meaning "cricket" in reference to the common name given the subfamily where Araneagryllus is placed. The species name is in honor of Dylan L. Heads, son of Dr. Heads. The female has a notable development of a white "emulsion" developed around the mouth parts and on the abdomen.

Araneagryllus dylani possesses a wide shield-like, pronotum which has irregularly spaced setae and prominent ridges along the center and margins. The legs are long with areas of short and long setae, and are marked with a pattern of dark marking ranging from spots on the profemur to stripes on the mesotibia. The metatibia sports two rows of ten to twelve spines, four subapical spurs, and three apical spurs. The middle apical spur is notably longer than the other two spurs. Both cerci the joint of one hind leg and the ovipositor are incomplete, having been removed during shaping and polishing of the amber specimen. Cladistic analysis places Araneagryllus within a clade composed of Arachnopsita, Leptopedetes, Longuripes, Mayagryllus, Nemoricantor, and Prolonguripes. All seven genera, among other characters, possessing an elongated middle apical spur.
