= Neoacla =

Scientific classification
- Domain: Eukaryota
- Kingdom: Animalia
- Phylum: Arthropoda
- Class: Insecta
- Order: Orthoptera
- Suborder: Ensifera
- Family: Phalangopsidae
- Genus: Neoacla; Desutter-Grandcolas, 1988

Genus of insects

Neoacla is a genus of crickets belonging to the family Phalangopsidae.

Its native range is Southern America.

Species:

- Neoacla clandestina (Nischk & D.Otte, 2000)
- Neoacla loiselae Desutter-Grandcolas, 1988
- Neoacla reticulata (Chopard, 1956)
- Neoacla vicina (Chopard, 1956)
