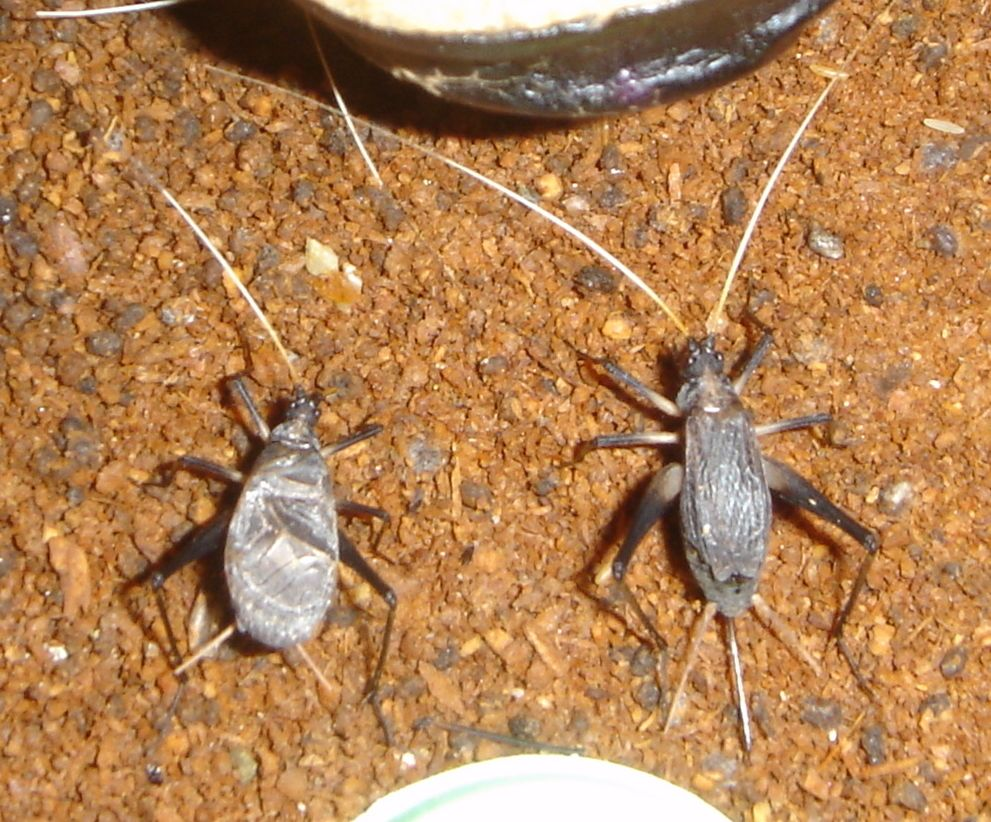
- Meloimorpha japonica

Scientific classification
- Kingdom: Animalia
- Phylum: Arthropoda
- Clade: Pancrustacea
- Class: Insecta
- Order: Orthoptera
- Suborder: Ensifera
- Infraorder: Gryllidea
- Superfamily: Grylloidea
- Family: Phalangopsidae
- Subfamily: Cacoplistinae; Saussure, 1877

Synonyms
- Cachoplistidae Saussure, 1877; Cachoplistites Saussure, 1877; Cacoplistinae Beier & Heikertinger, 1954; Homoeogryllinae Gorochov, 1986

= Cacoplistinae =

Subfamily of crickets

The Cacoplistinae are a subfamily of crickets (Orthoptera: Ensifera) of the family Phalangopsidae; they are also known by the orthographic variant "Cachoplistinae" and may be called beetle crickets or bell crickets. Species are terrestrial, carnivorous or omnivorous and can be found in: Africa, tropical Asia, Korea and Japan.

== Nomenclature ==
The names for this subfamily and the tribe Cachoplistini, are based on Saussure's (1877) genus "Cachoplistus" and priority for family-group names based on his use of "Cachoplistites". The agreed type genus is Cacoplistes; the use of "Cachoplistinae" was by Chopard (1968).

=== Tribes and Genera ===
The Orthoptera Species File lists three tribes:

Cachoplistini Saussure, 1877

- Cacoplistes Brunner von Wattenwyl, 1873

==== Homoeogryllini ====
Authority: Gorochov, 1986

1. Homoeogryllus Guérin-Méneville, 1847
2. Meloimorpha Walker, 1870

==== Seselini ====
Authority: Hugel & Desutter-Grandcolas, 2021; distribution: Indian Ocean islands

1. Gryllapterus Bolívar, 1912
2. Phaeogryllus Bolívar, 1912
3. Phalangacris Bolívar, 1895
4. Seselia Hugel & Desutter-Grandcolas, 2021
