= Phaloriinae =

Scientific classification
- Kingdom: Animalia
- Phylum: Arthropoda
- Clade: Pancrustacea
- Class: Insecta
- Order: Orthoptera
- Suborder: Ensifera
- Superfamily: Grylloidea
- Family: Phalangopsidae
- Subfamily: Phaloriinae; Gorochov, 1985

Subfamily of crickets

External image
- Images at iNaturalist

The Phaloriinae is a subfamily of crickets (Orthoptera: Ensifera) of the family Phalangopsidae. Species are terrestrial and are distributed in: Africa, tropical Asia, Korea, Australia and the Pacific Islands.

== Tribes and genera ==
The Orthoptera Species File lists:

- tribe Phaloriini Gorochov, 1985
  - Afrophaloria Desutter-Grandcolas, 2015
  - Borneloria Gorochov, 2018
  - Ceyloria Gorochov, 1996
  - Gorochovius Xie, Zheng & Li, 2004
  - Phaloria (insect) Stål, 1877
  - Phasmagryllus Desutter-Grandcolas, 2015
  - Pseudotrigonidium Chopard, 1915
  - Strophiola Uvarov, 1940
  - Sumatloria Gorochov, 2003
  - Trellius Gorochov, 1988
  - Tremellia Stål, 1877
  - Upupagryllus Desutter-Grandcolas, 2015
  - Vescelia Stål, 1877
- tribe Subtiloriini Gorochov, 2003
  - Heterotrypus Saussure, 1878
  - Kameruloria Gorochov, 2003
  - Schizotrypus Chopard, 1954
  - Subtiloria Gorochov, 1999
- unplaced monotypic genus† Electrogryllus Gorochov, 1992 - †E. septentrionalis (Chopard, 1936)
