= Cacoplistes =

Scientific classification
- Kingdom: Animalia
- Phylum: Arthropoda
- Clade: Pancrustacea
- Class: Insecta
- Order: Orthoptera
- Suborder: Ensifera
- Superfamily: Grylloidea
- Family: Phalangopsidae
- Subfamily: Cacoplistinae
- Genus: Cacoplistes; Brunner von Wattenwyl, 1873

Synonyms
- Cachoplistus Saussure, 1877

Genus of crickets

External image
- Images at iNaturalist

Cacoplistes is the type genus of cricket in the subfamily Cachoplistinae; it has been placed in its own tribe, the Cachoplistini. Its recorded distribution is: India, southern China and Indochina.

== Species ==
The Orthoptera Species File lists:

subgenus Cacoplistes Brunner von Wattenwyl, 1873

1. Cacoplistes brunnerianus Saussure, 1877 - type species
2. Cacoplistes indicus Chopard, 1935
3. Cacoplistes proximus Gorochov, 2003

subgenus Laminogryllus Gorochov, 2003

1. Cacoplistes brevisparamerus Wang, Zhang, Wei & Liu, 2017
2. Cacoplistes choui Liu & Shi, 2012
3. Cacoplistes derelictus Gorochov, 2003
4. Cacoplistes latioribus Meena, Swaminathan & Nagar, 2019
5. Cacoplistes rogenhoferi Saussure, 1877
6. Cacoplistes westwoodianus Saussure, 1877
