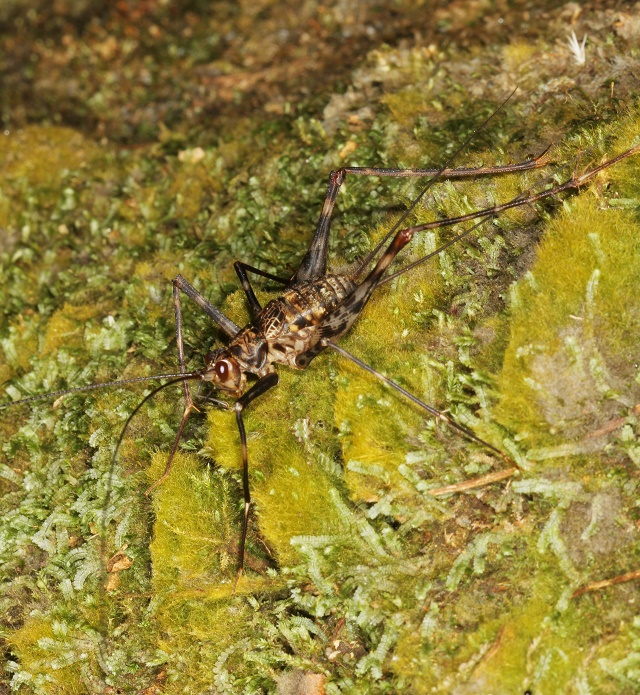
- P. alluaudi

Scientific classification
- Kingdom: Animalia
- Phylum: Arthropoda
- Clade: Pancrustacea
- Class: Insecta
- Order: Orthoptera
- Suborder: Ensifera
- Family: Phalangopsidae
- Subfamily: Cacoplistinae
- Tribe: Seselini
- Genus: Phalangacris; Bolívar, 1895

= Phalangacris =

Genus of crickets

Phalangacris is a genus of crickets (Orthoptera: Ensifera) in the family Phalangopsidae and now placed in the new (2021) tribe Seselini. Species are found in the Indian Ocean islands including the Seychelles.

== Species ==
The Orthoptera Species File lists:

- Phalangacris alluaudi Bolívar, 1895 - type species
- Phalangacris phaloricephala Gorochov, 2006
