= Phalangopsis =

Scientific classification
- Domain: Eukaryota
- Kingdom: Animalia
- Phylum: Arthropoda
- Class: Insecta
- Order: Orthoptera
- Suborder: Ensifera
- Family: Phalangopsidae
- Subfamily: Phalangopsinae
- Tribe: Phalangopsini
- Genus: Phalangopsis; Serville, 1831

Genus of crickets

Phalangopsis is a Neotropical genus of crickets (Orthoptera: Ensifera) in the family Phalangopsidae, subfamily Phalangopsinae, tribe Phalangopsini.

== Species ==
The Orthoptera Species File lists:

- Phalangopsis arenita Mews & Sperber, 2008
- Phalangopsis araguaia Pereira Junta, Castro-Souza & Lopes Ferreira, 2020
- Phalangopsis bauxitica Mews & Sperber, 2008
- Phalangopsis carvalhoi Costa Lima & Costa Leite, 1953
- Phalangopsis ferratilis Pereira Junta, Castro-Souza & Lopes Ferreira, 2020
- Phalangopsis flavilongipes Desutter-Grandcolas, 1992
- Phalangopsis gaudichaudi Saussure, 1874
- Phalangopsis kyju Pereira Junta, Castro-Souza & Lopes Ferreira, 2020
- Phalangopsis kysuia Pereira Junta, Castro-Souza & Lopes Ferreira, 2020
- Phalangopsis longipes Serville, 1831 - type species (by subsequent designation, localities French Guiana, Brazil)
- Phalangopsis quartzitica Pereira Junta, Castro-Souza & Lopes Ferreira, 2020
