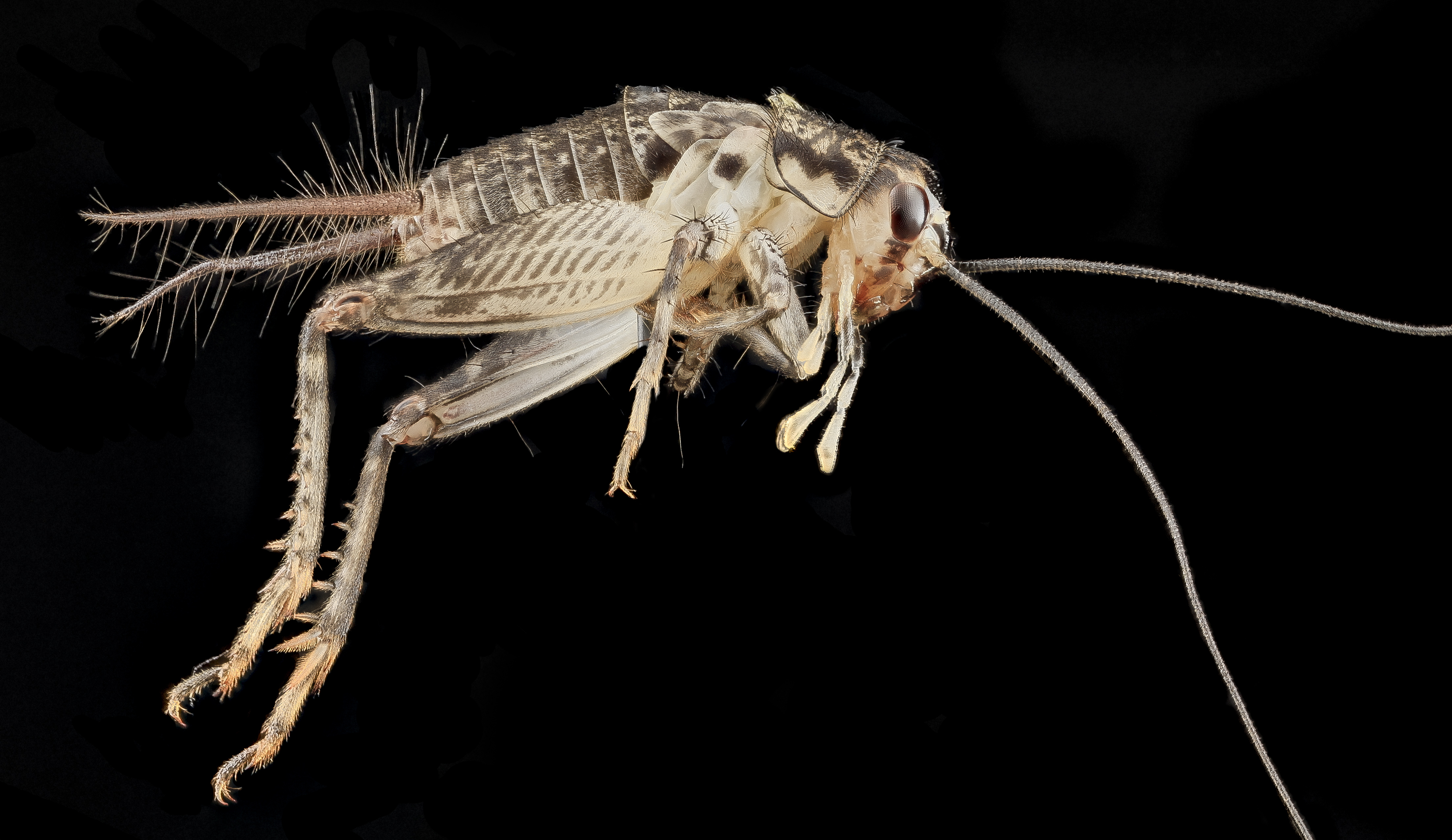

Scientific classification
- Domain: Eukaryota
- Kingdom: Animalia
- Phylum: Arthropoda
- Class: Insecta
- Order: Orthoptera
- Suborder: Ensifera
- Family: Gryllidae
- Genus: Velarifictorus
- Subgenus: Velarifictorus
- Species: V. micado

Binomial name
- Velarifictorus micado (Saussure, 1877)

Synonyms
- Gryllus latefasciatus Chopard, 1933

= Velarifictorus micado =

Species of cricket

Velarifictorus micado, the Japanese burrowing cricket, is a cricket in the subfamily Gryllinae (family Gryllidae). It is found in southern Asia, along with an introduced population in the United States. It was first reported in the US in 1959, likely as overwintering eggs in the soil of imported plants, and has since spread all throughout the eastern half of the country. V. micado is considered to be quite passive and non-destructive. Studies have shown that its range has spread northward and may be much more invasive than previously thought.

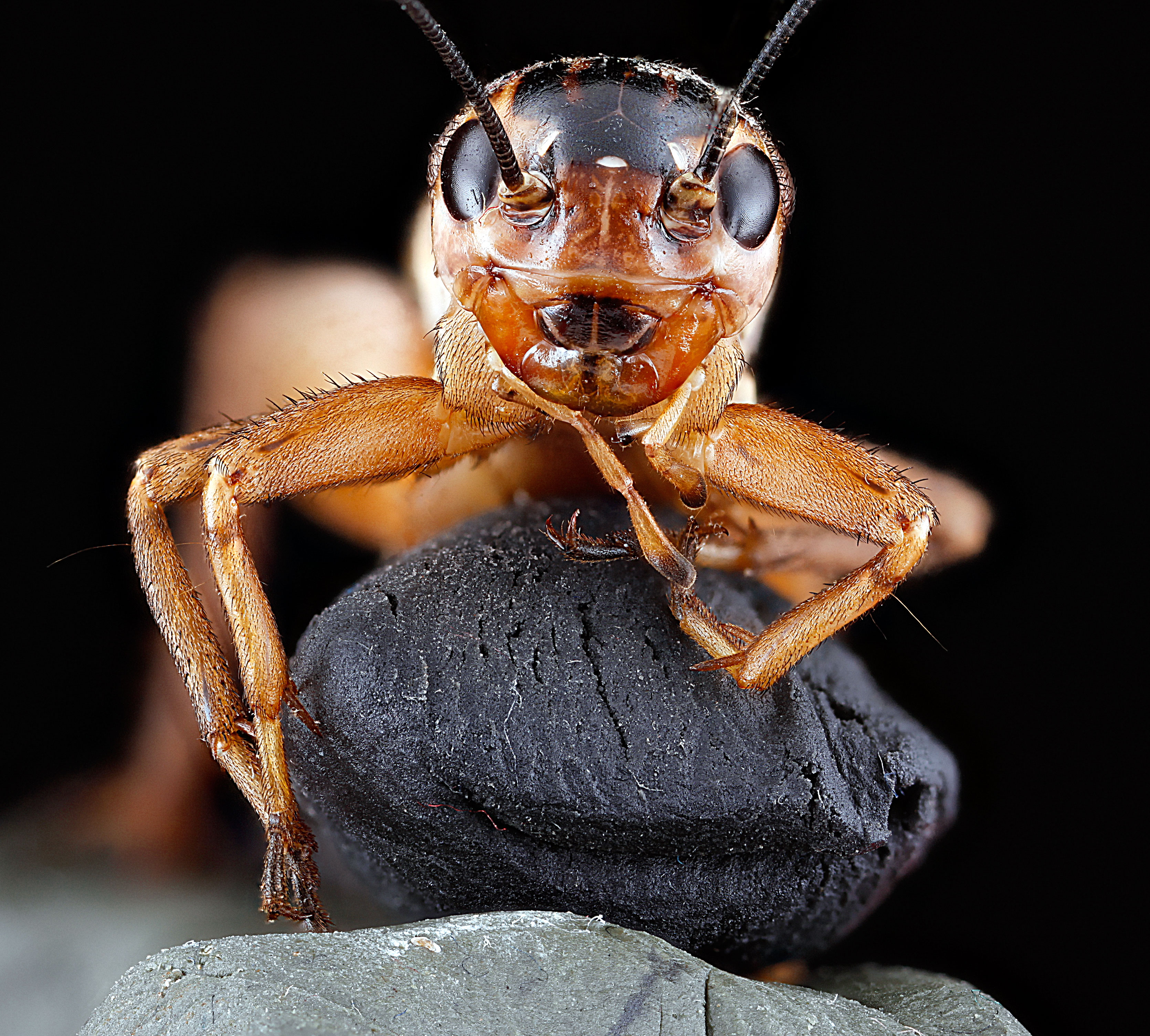
V. micado front

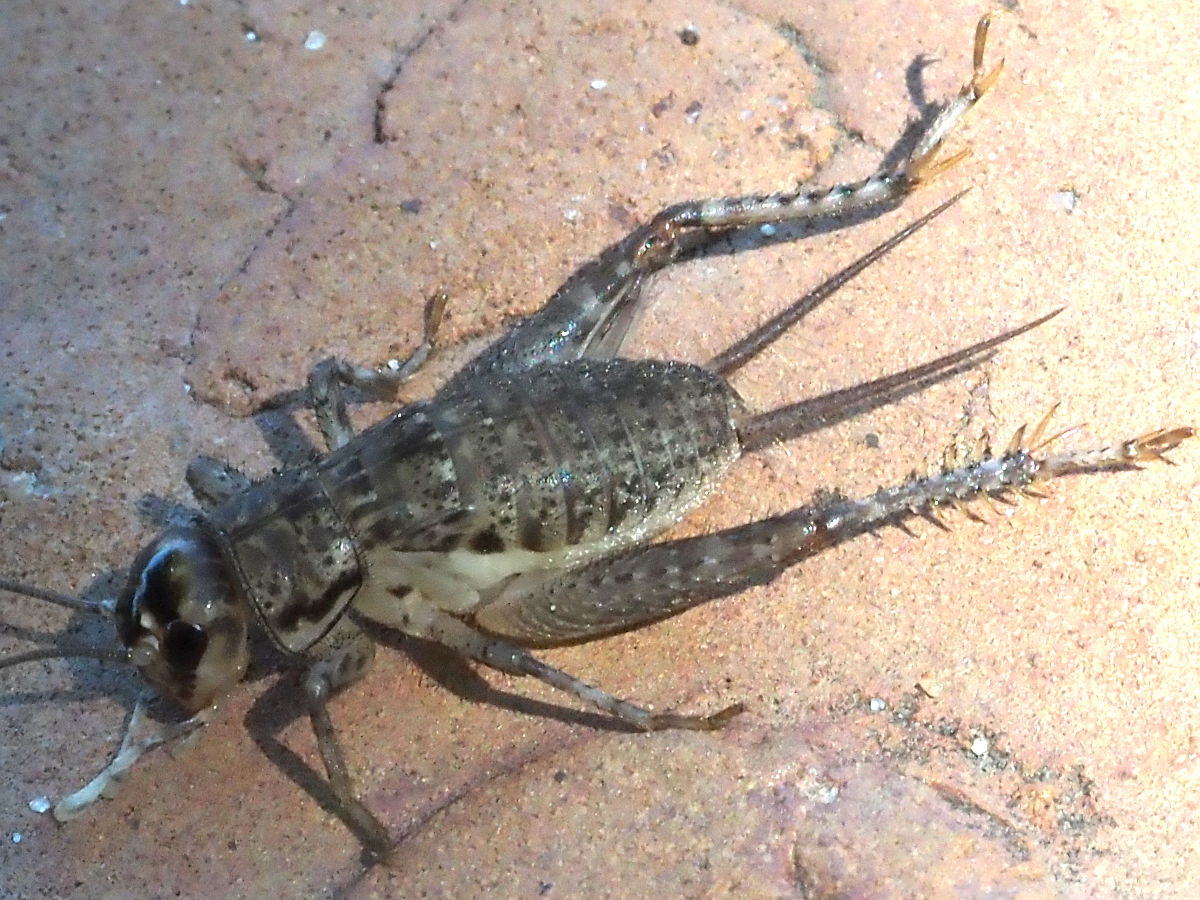
paralyzed by a wasp – dorsal Wildlife Prairie Park

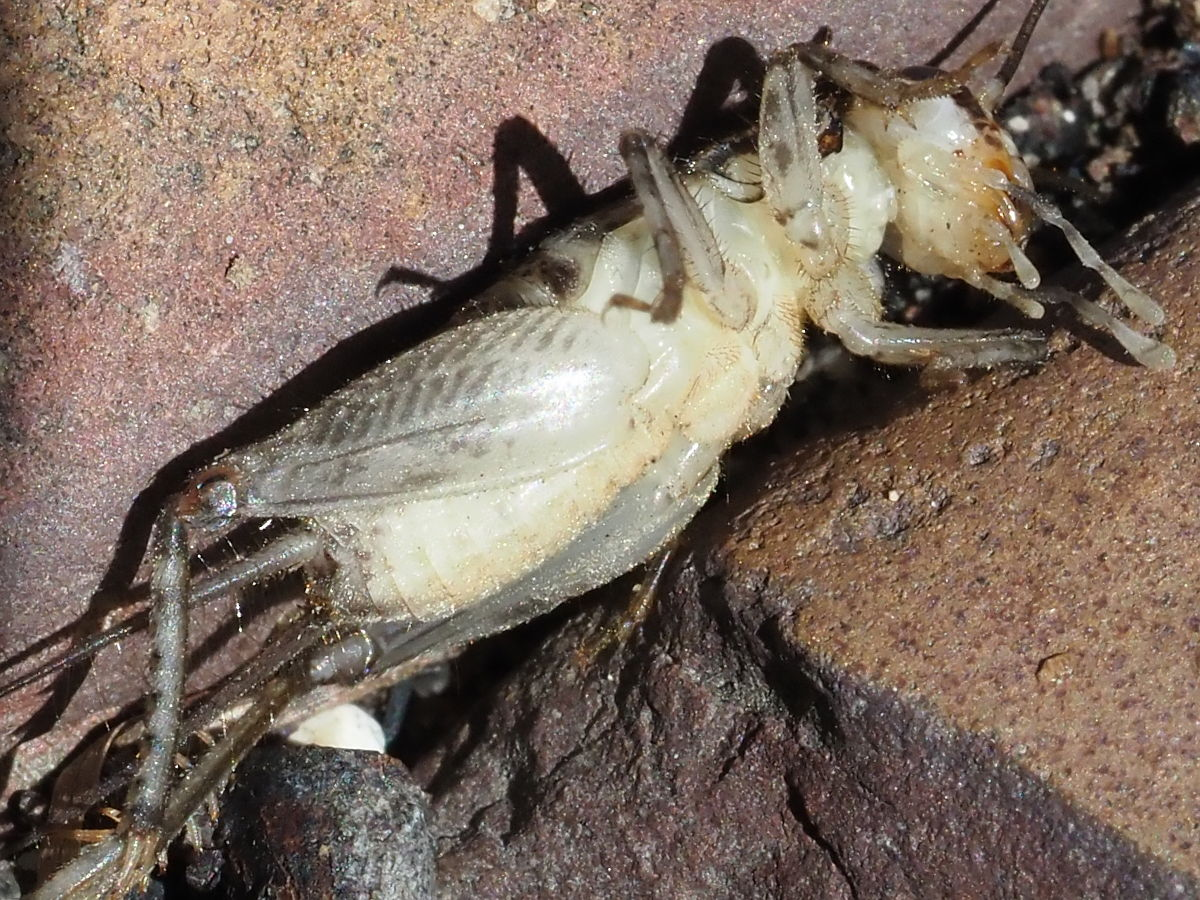
paralyzed by a wasp – ventral Wildlife Prairie Park

V. micado song
