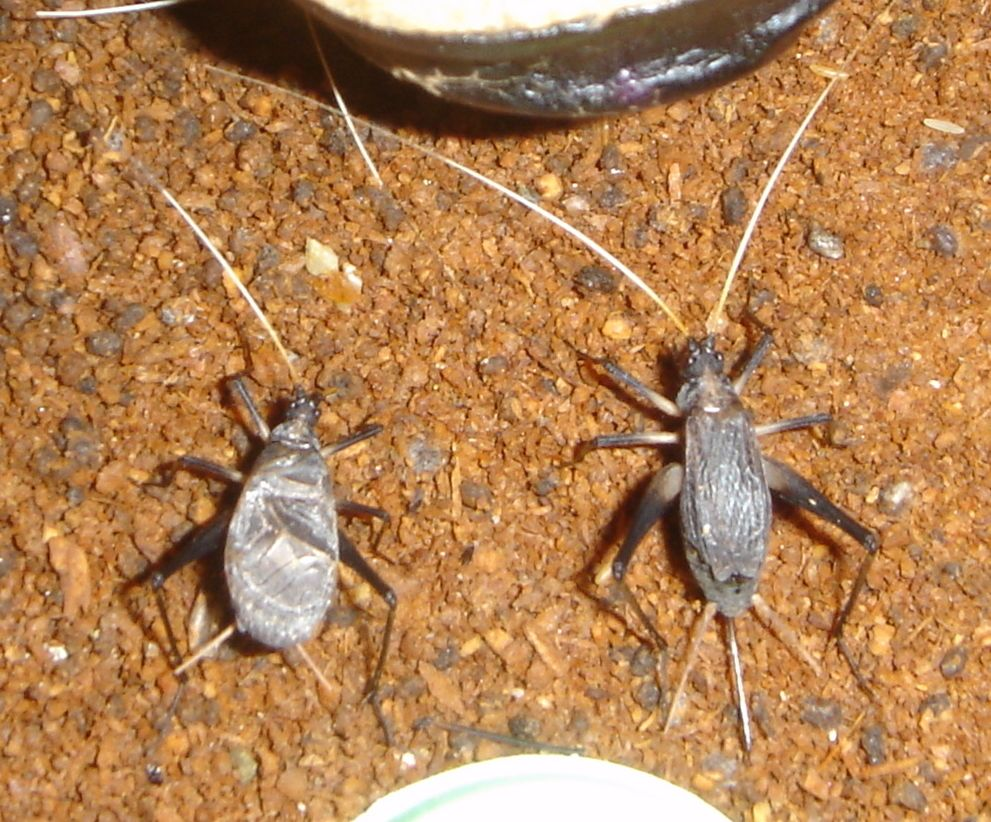
- Meloimorpha japonica

Scientific classification
- Kingdom: Animalia
- Phylum: Arthropoda
- Class: Insecta
- Order: Orthoptera
- Suborder: Ensifera
- Family: Phalangopsidae
- Subfamily: Cachoplistinae
- Tribe: Homoeogryllini
- Genus: Meloimorpha; Walker, 1870

Synonyms
- Meliomorpha Storozhenko & Paik, 2007

= Meloimorpha =

Genus of crickets

Meloimorpha is a genus of cricket in the subfamily Cachoplistinae and tribe Homoeogryllini. The recorded distribution is: India, China, Korea, Japan and Vietnam (but probably other countries in Indo-China).

== Species ==
The Orthoptera Species File lists:

- Meloimorpha albicornis Walker, 1869 - India, Vietnam
- Meloimorpha cincticornis Walker, 1870 - type species, locality "Indian subcontinent"
- Meloimorpha indica Agarwal & Sinha, 1988
- Meloimorpha japonica Haan, 1842 - India, Indo-china, China, Korea, Japan
