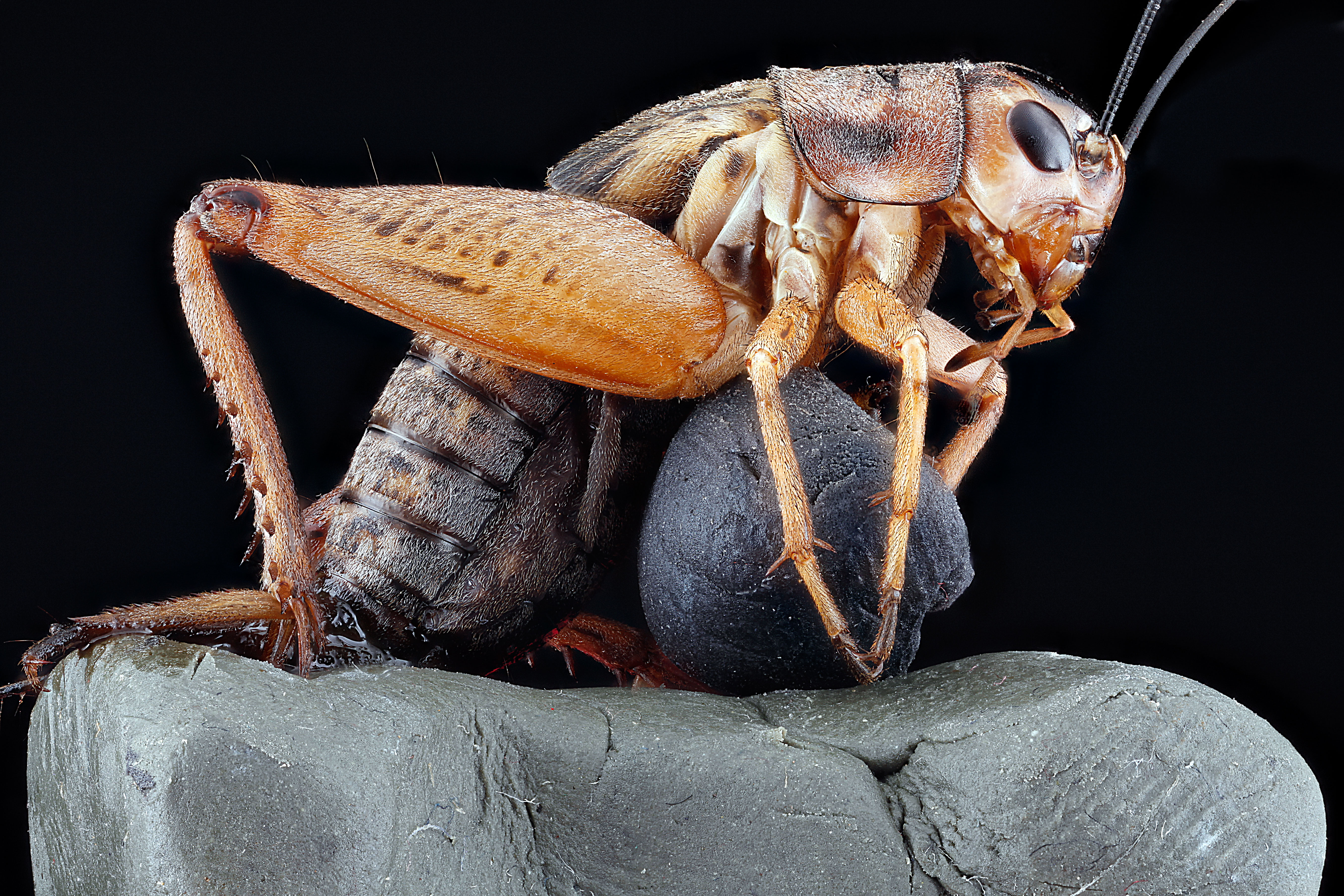
- Velarifictorus micado

Scientific classification
- Kingdom: Animalia
- Phylum: Arthropoda
- Clade: Pancrustacea
- Class: Insecta
- Order: Orthoptera
- Suborder: Ensifera
- Family: Gryllidae
- Subfamily: Gryllinae
- Tribe: Gryllini
- Genus: Velarifictorus; Randell, 1964

= Velarifictorus =

Genus of crickets

Velarifictorus is a genus of crickets in the family Gryllidae and tribe Gryllini. Species have been recorded in Australia, Asia, and Africa, as well as the eastern United States where the type species V. micado was introduced by humans.

== Species ==
Velarifictorus includes the following species:

=== Subgenus Buangina Otte & Alexander, 1983 ===
1. Velarifictorus anemba Otte & Alexander, 1983
2. Velarifictorus bogabilla Otte & Alexander, 1983
3. Velarifictorus caribonga Otte & Alexander, 1983
4. Velarifictorus diminuens Walker, 1869
5. Velarifictorus dummala Otte & Alexander, 1983
6. Velarifictorus fistulator Saussure, 1877
7. Velarifictorus gayandi Otte & Alexander, 1983
8. Velarifictorus illalonga Otte & Alexander, 1983
9. Velarifictorus mediocris Mjoberg, 1913
10. Velarifictorus pikiara Otte & Alexander, 1983
11. Velarifictorus woomera Otte & Alexander, 1983

=== Subgenus Pseudocoiblemmus Gorochov, 2001 ===
1. Velarifictorus bilobus Tan, Dawwrueng & Artchawakom, 2015
2. Velarifictorus brevifrons Gorochov, 2001
3. Velarifictorus longifrons Chopard, 1969

=== Subgenus Velarifictorus Randell, 1964 ===
species group latithorax (Chopard, 1928)

1. Velarifictorus agitatus Ma, 2019
2. Velarifictorus fallax (Chopard, 1969)
3. Velarifictorus lambai Bhowmik, 1985
4. Velarifictorus latithorax (Chopard, 1928)
5. Velarifictorus stultus Ma, 2019

species group unassigned

1. Velarifictorus acutilobus Ingrisch, 1998
2. Velarifictorus affinis (Chopard, 1948)
3. Velarifictorus albipalpis (Chopard, 1969)
4. Velarifictorus amani Otte & Cade, 1983
5. Velarifictorus andamanensis (Bhowmik, 1967)
6. Velarifictorus angustus Ingrisch, 1998
7. Velarifictorus arisanicus (Shiraki, 1930)
8. Velarifictorus aspersus (Walker, 1869)
9. Velarifictorus bannaensis Zhang, Liu & Shi, 2017
10. Velarifictorus basui Bhowmik, 1985
11. Velarifictorus beybienkoi Gorochov, 1985
12. Velarifictorus bicornis Ingrisch, 1998
13. Velarifictorus bolivari (Uvarov, 1912)
14. Velarifictorus bos Gorochov, 1992
15. Velarifictorus botswanus Otte, Toms & Cade, 1988
16. Velarifictorus brunneri (Chopard, 1969)
17. Velarifictorus bubalus Gorochov, 1992
18. Velarifictorus bulbosus Ingrisch, 1998
19. Velarifictorus burri (Chopard, 1962)
20. Velarifictorus ceylonicus (Chopard, 1928)
21. Velarifictorus changus Otte, 1987
22. Velarifictorus chobei Otte, Toms & Cade, 1988
23. Velarifictorus confinius Ingrisch, 1998
24. Velarifictorus cuon Gorochov, 2001
25. Velarifictorus curvinervis Xie, 2004
26. Velarifictorus dedzai Otte, 1987
27. Velarifictorus dianxiensis He, 2018
28. Velarifictorus elephas Gorochov, 1992
29. Velarifictorus flavifrons Chopard, 1966
30. Velarifictorus ghanzicus Otte, 1987
31. Velarifictorus gradifrons Ingrisch, 1998
32. Velarifictorus grylloides (Chopard, 1969)
33. Velarifictorus hemelytrus (Saussure, 1877)
34. Velarifictorus hiulcus (Karsch, 1893)
35. Velarifictorus horridus Ingrisch, 1998
36. Velarifictorus jharnae (Bhowmik, 1967)
37. Velarifictorus kasungu Otte, 1987
38. Velarifictorus katangensis (Sjöstedt, 1917)
39. Velarifictorus khasiensis Vasanth & Ghosh, 1975
40. Velarifictorus landrevus Ma, Qiao & Zhang, 2019
41. Velarifictorus lengwe Otte, 1987
42. Velarifictorus leonidi Gorochov, 2001
43. Velarifictorus lepesmei (Chopard, 1961)
44. Velarifictorus lesnei (Chopard, 1935)
45. Velarifictorus maindroni (Chopard, 1969)
46. Velarifictorus matuga Otte & Cade, 1983
47. Velarifictorus micado (Saussure, 1877) – type species (as Scapsipedus micado Saussure)
48. Velarifictorus minoculus Ingrisch, 1998
49. Velarifictorus modicoides Ingrisch, 1998
50. Velarifictorus mosambicus (Chopard, 1962)
51. Velarifictorus natus Otte, Toms & Cade, 1988
52. Velarifictorus neavei (Sjöstedt, 1917)
53. Velarifictorus nepalicus Bey-Bienko, 1968
54. Velarifictorus nigrifrons (Brunner von Wattenwyl, 1893)
55. Velarifictorus nigrithorax (Chopard, 1962)
56. Velarifictorus novaeguineae Gorochov, 1988
57. Velarifictorus nyasa Otte, 1987
58. Velarifictorus obniger Otte & Cade, 1983
59. Velarifictorus okavangus Otte, Toms & Cade, 1988
60. Velarifictorus ornatus (Shiraki, 1911)
61. Velarifictorus parvus (Chopard, 1928)
62. Velarifictorus politus Ichikawa, 2001
63. Velarifictorus problematicus Gorochov, 1996
64. Velarifictorus pui Ingrisch, 1998
65. Velarifictorus raychaudhurii (Bhowmik, 1967)
66. Velarifictorus rectus Ingrisch, 1998
67. Velarifictorus rhombifer (Chopard, 1954)
68. Velarifictorus ryukyuensis Oshiro, 1990
69. Velarifictorus sahyadrensis Vasanth, 1991
70. Velarifictorus saussurei (Chopard, 1969)
71. Velarifictorus shillongensis Vasanth, 1993
72. Velarifictorus shimba Otte & Cade, 1983
73. Velarifictorus similis (Chopard, 1938)
74. Velarifictorus simillimus (Chopard, 1938)
75. Velarifictorus spinosus Ingrisch, 1998
76. Velarifictorus sukhadae (Bhowmik, 1967)
77. Velarifictorus sulcifrons Ingrisch, 1998
78. Velarifictorus sus Gorochov, 1992
79. Velarifictorus temburongensis Tan, Ingrisch & Wahab, 2017
80. Velarifictorus tenepalpus Ingrisch, 1998
81. Velarifictorus transversus (Chopard, 1938)
82. Velarifictorus triangularis Ingrisch, 1998
83. Velarifictorus vicinus (Chopard, 1955)
84. Velarifictorus vietnamensis Gorochov, 2001
85. Velarifictorus viphius Otte, 1987
86. Velarifictorus vittifrons (Sjöstedt, 1917)
87. Velarifictorus whelleni (Chopard, 1954)
88. Velarifictorus zhengi Zheng & Ma, 2022

=== Subgenus unassigned ===
1. Velarifictorus kittana Otte & Alexander, 1983
2. Velarifictorus nullaga Otte & Alexander, 1983
3. Velarifictorus scutellatus Chopard, 1951
4. Velarifictorus urunga Otte & Alexander, 1983
