= Sam W. Heads =

English palaeontologist (born 1983)

- Born: 22 April 1983 (age 43); Northumberland, England
- Education: University of Portsmouth Ph.D, 2009; B.Sc. (Hons), 2004
- Occupations: Paleontologist, Entomologist
- Spouse: Tina Louise Heads
- Scientific career
- Workplaces: University of Illinois Urbana-Champaign 2009– University of Portsmouth 2001–2009
- Doctoral advisor: Dr David M. Martill (University of Portsmouth)
- Other academic advisors: Prof. Dr. Paul A. Selden (University of Kansas)

Sam W. Heads (born 22 April 1983 in Ashington Northumberland, England) is a British palaeontologist, a Fellow of the Linnean Society of London, a Fellow of the Royal Entomological Society, as well as a former Officer and Editor-in-Chief at the Orthopterists' Society.

He received his training at the University of Portsmouth where he was awarded a B.Sc. (Hons) in Palaeobiology and Evolution in 2004 and a Ph.D. in Entomology in 2009. Heads is an authority on the taxonomy, systematics and palaeontology of Orthoptera. He is based at the Illinois Natural History Survey, University of Illinois Urbana-Champaign.

== Select publications ==
- Heads, S.W. & Wang, Y. 2013. First fossil record of Melanoplus differentialis (Orthoptera: Acrididae: Melanoplinae). Entomological News 123: 33–37.
- Heads, S.W., Taylor, S.J. & Krejca, J.K. 2013. First record of Scapteriscus abbreviatus from Belize (Orthoptera: Gryllotalpidae). Entomological News 123: 241–244.
- Hollier, J. & Heads, S.W. 2014. The type specimens of Orthoptera described by American entomologists in the Muséum d’histoire naturelle de Genève. Revue suisse de Zoology 121: 63–76.
- Barling, N., Heads, S.W. & Martill, D.M. 2013. A new parasitoid wasp (Hymenoptera: Chalcidoidea) from the Lower Cretaceous Crato Formation of Brazil: the first Mesozoic Pteromalidae. Cretaceous Research 45: 258–264,
- Hollier, J., Bruckner, H. & Heads, S.W. 2013. An annotated list of the Orthoptera (Insecta) species described by Henri de Saussure, with an account of the primary type material housed in the Muséum d’histoire naturelle de Genève, Part 5: Grylloidea. Revue suisse de Zoology 120: 445–535.
- Jepson, J.E., Heads, S.W., Makarkin, V.N. & Ren, D. 2013. New fossil mantidflies (Insecta, Neuroptera, Mantispidae) from the Mesozoic of northeastern China. Palaeontology 56: 603–613.
- Heads, S.W., Penney, D. & Green, D.I. 2012. A new species of the cricket genus Proanaxipha in Miocene amber from the Dominican Republic (Orthoptera, Gryllidae, Pentacentrinae). ZooKeys 229: 111–118.
- Pérez-de la Fuente, R., Heads, S.W., Hinojosa-Díaz, I.A. & Engel, M.S. 2012. The first record of Protogryllinae from the Jurassic of India (Orthoptera: Grylloidea). Journal of the Kansas Entomological Society 85: 53–58.
- Hollier, J. & Heads, S.W. 2012. An annotated list of the Orthoptera (Insecta) species described by Henri de Saussure, with an account of the primary type material housed in the Muséum d’histoire naturelle de Genève, Part 1: Tridactyloidea. Revue suisse de Zoology 119: 149–160.
- Rodríguez, F. & Heads, S.W. 2012. New mole crickets of the genus Scapteriscus Scudder (Orthoptera: Gryllotalpidae: Scapteriscinae) from Colombia. Zootaxa 3282: 61–68.
- Heads, S.W. & Taylor, S.J. 2012. A new species of Ripipteryx from Belize with a key to the species of the Scrofulosa Group (Orthoptera, Ripipterygidae). ZooKeys 169: 1–8.
- Heads, S.W. & Leuzinger, L. 2011. On the placement of the Cretaceous orthopteran Brauckmannia groeningae from Brazil, with notes on the relationships of Schizodactylidae (Orthoptera: Ensifera). ZooKeys 77: 17–30.
- Heads, S.W. 2010. New Tridactyloidea in Miocene amber from the Dominican Republic (Orthoptera: Caelifera). Annales de la Société Entomologique de France 46: 204–210.
- Heads, S.W. 2010. A new species of Ripipteryx from the Ecuadorian Andes (Orthoptera: Tridactyloidea: Ripipterygidae). Zootaxa 2476: 23–29.
- Heads, S.W. 2010. The first fossil spider cricket (Orthoptera: Gryllidae: Phalangopsinae): 20 million years of troglobiomorphosis or exaptation in the dark? Zoological Journal of the Linnean Society 158: 56–65.
- Heads, S.W. & Maehr, M.D. 2009. Proposed conservation of the name Gastrimargus Saussure, 1884 (Orthoptera: Acrididae: Oedipodinae) threatened by an unused senior homonym. Zootaxa 2268: 65–68.
- Heads, S.W. 2009. A new pygmy mole cricket in Cretaceous amber from Burma (Orthoptera: Tridactylidae). Denisia 26: 75–82.
- Heads, S.W. 2009. New pygmy grasshoppers in Miocene amber from the Dominican Republic (Orthoptera: Tetrigidae). Denisia 26: 69–74.
- Delclòs, X., Nel, A., Azar, D. Bechly, G., Dunlop, J.A., Engel, M.S. & Heads, S.W. 2008. The enigmatic Mesozoic insect taxon Chresmodidae (Polyneoptera): new palaeobiological and phylogenetic data, with the description of a new species from the Lower Cretaceous of Brazil. Neues Jahrbuch für Geologie und Paläontologie Abhandlungen 247: 353–381.
- Heads, S.W., Martill, D.M. & Loveridge, R.F. 2008. Palaeoentomological paradise: the Cretaceous Crato Formation of Brazil. Antenna 32: 91–98.
- Heads, S.W. & Chesmore, D. 2008. New records of the slender ground-hopper Tetrix subulata (Orthoptera: Tetrigidae) from Yorkshire. British Journal of Entomology & Natural History 21: 243–246.
- Heads, S.W. & Lakin, C. 2008. A new katydid of the genus Phoebolampta from St Maarten (Orthoptera: Tettigoniidae: Phaneropterinae). Polskie Pismo Entomologiczne 77: 256–266.
- Heads, S.W. 2008. A new species of Yuripopovia (Coleorrhyncha: Progonocimicidae) from the Early Cretaceous of the Isle of Wight. British Journal of Entomology & Natural History 21: 247–254 .
- Heads, S.W. 2008. The first fossil Proscopiidae (Insecta, Orthoptera, Eumastacoidea) with comments on the historical biogeography and evolution of the family. Palaeontology 51: 499–507.
- Heads, S.W. 2006 [for 2005]. A new caddisfly larval case (Insecta, Trichoptera) from the Lower Cretaceous Vectis Formation (Wealden Group) of the Isle of Wight, southern England. Proceedings of the Geologists’ Association 117: 307–310.
- Menon, F., Heads, S.W. & Martill, D.M. 2005. New Palaeontinidae (Insecta: Cicadomorpha) from the Lower Cretaceous Crato Formation of Brazil. Cretaceous Research 26: 837–844.
- Menon, F. & Heads, S.W. 2005. New species of Palaeontinidae (Insecta: Cicadomorpha) from the Lower Cretaceous Crato Formation of Brazil. Stuttgarter Beiträge zur Naturkunde, Serie B (Geologie und Paläontologie) 357: 1–11.
- Heads, S.W., Martill, D.M. & Loveridge, R.F. 2005. An exceptionally preserved antlion (Insecta, Neuroptera) with colour pattern preservation from the Cretaceous of Brazil. Palaeontology 48: 1409–1417.
