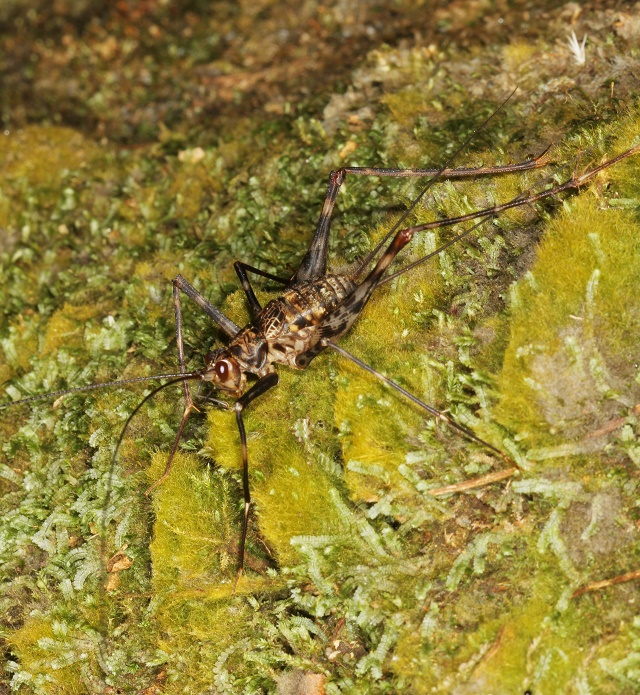
- Phalangacris alluaudi (Phalangopsinae)

Scientific classification
- Kingdom: Animalia
- Phylum: Arthropoda
- Clade: Pancrustacea
- Class: Insecta
- Order: Orthoptera
- Suborder: Ensifera
- Infraorder: Gryllidea
- Superfamily: Grylloidea
- Family: Phalangopsidae; Blanchard, 1845

Synonyms
- Neoaclidae Desutter-Grandcolas, 1988; Subfamily Group: Phalangopsinae; Phalangopsites Blanchard, 1845

= Phalangopsidae =

Family of crickets

Phalangopsidae, which includes the "spider crickets" and their allies, is a reconstituted (2014) family of crickets (Orthoptera: Ensifera), with the type genus Phalangopsis. Priority for family-group names based on this genus dates from Blanchard's "Phalangopsites".

== Distribution ==
Species in this family are widely distributed, especially southern Hemisphere (i.e. continents excluding Europe, most of N. America and Antarctica). These terrestrial Orthoptera, like the majority of crickets, tend to thrive in tropical or subtropical environments.

== Subfamilies, tribes and selected genera ==
The Orthoptera Species File lists:

subfamily Cachoplistinae Saussure, 1877 – Africa, Asia

- tribe Cachoplistini Saussure, 1877
  - Cacoplistes Brunner von Wattenwyl, 1873
- Homoeogryllini Gorochov, 1986
  - Homoeogryllus Guérin-Méneville, 1847
  - Meloimorpha Walker, 1870
- tribe Seselini Hugel & Desutter-Grandcolas, 2021
  - Phalangacris Bolívar, 1895

Luzarinae Hebard, 1928 – Central and South America

- subtribe Amphiacustina Hubbell, 1938
  - †Araneagryllus Heads, 2010
  - Mayagryllus Desutter-Grandcolas & Hubbell, 1993
- subtribe Lernecina Desutter-Grandcolas, 1987
- subtribe Luzarina Hebard, 1928
  - Luzara Walker, 1869
  - Luzarida Hebard, 1928

Paragryllinae Desutter-Grandcolas, 1987 - widespread tropical, mostly southern hemisphere

- tribe Aclodini Desutter-Grandcolas, 1992
  - Aclodes Hebard, 1928
  - Paraclodes Desutter-Grandcolas, 1992
  - Uvaroviella Chopard, 1923
- tribe Paragryllini Desutter-Grandcolas, 1987
  - subtribe Adelosgryllina Gorochov, 2019 - south America
    - Adelosgryllus Mesa & Zefa, 2004
  - subtribe Brevizaclina Gorochov, 2014
    - Brevizacla Gorochov, 2003
    - Mikluchomaklaia Gorochov, 1986
  - subtribe Mexiaclina Gorochov, 2014
    - Mexiacla Gorochov, 2007
    - Oaxacla Gorochov, 2007
    - Paragryllodes Karny, 1909
  - subtribe Neoaclina Desutter-Grandcolas, 1988 - S. America: other genera
    - Neoacla Desutter-Grandcolas, 1988
  - subtribe Paragryllina Desutter-Grandcolas, 1987 - S. America & Africa: other genera
    - Paragryllus Guérin-Méneville, 1844
  - subtribe Strogulomorphina Desutter-Grandcolas, 1988 - S. America: other genera
    - Strogulomorpha Desutter-Grandcolas, 1988
  - no subtribe:
    - Apteracla Gorochov, 2009
    - Caltathra Otte, 1987
    - Escondacla Nischk & Otte, 2000
    - Laranda (insect) Walker, 1869
    - Pseudendacustes Chopard, 1928

Phalangopsinae Blanchard, 1845

- Endacustini Gorochov, 1986
- Luzaropsini Gorochov, 1986
- Otteiini Koçak & Kemal, 2009
- Phalangopsini Blanchard, 1845
  - Phalangopsis Serville, 1831

Phaloriinae Gorochov, 1985 – Africa, Asia & Pacific

- tribe Phaloriini Gorochov, 1985
  - Phaloria (insect) Stål, 1877
  - Trellius Gorochov, 1988
  - Vescelia Stål, 1877
- tribe Subtiloriini Gorochov, 2011
- unplaced genus† Electrogryllus Gorochov, 1992

incertae sedis

- Megacris – monotypic: M. lipsae Desutter-Grandcolas, 2012
- Stalacris – monotypic: S. meridionalis Desutter-Grandcolas, 2013
