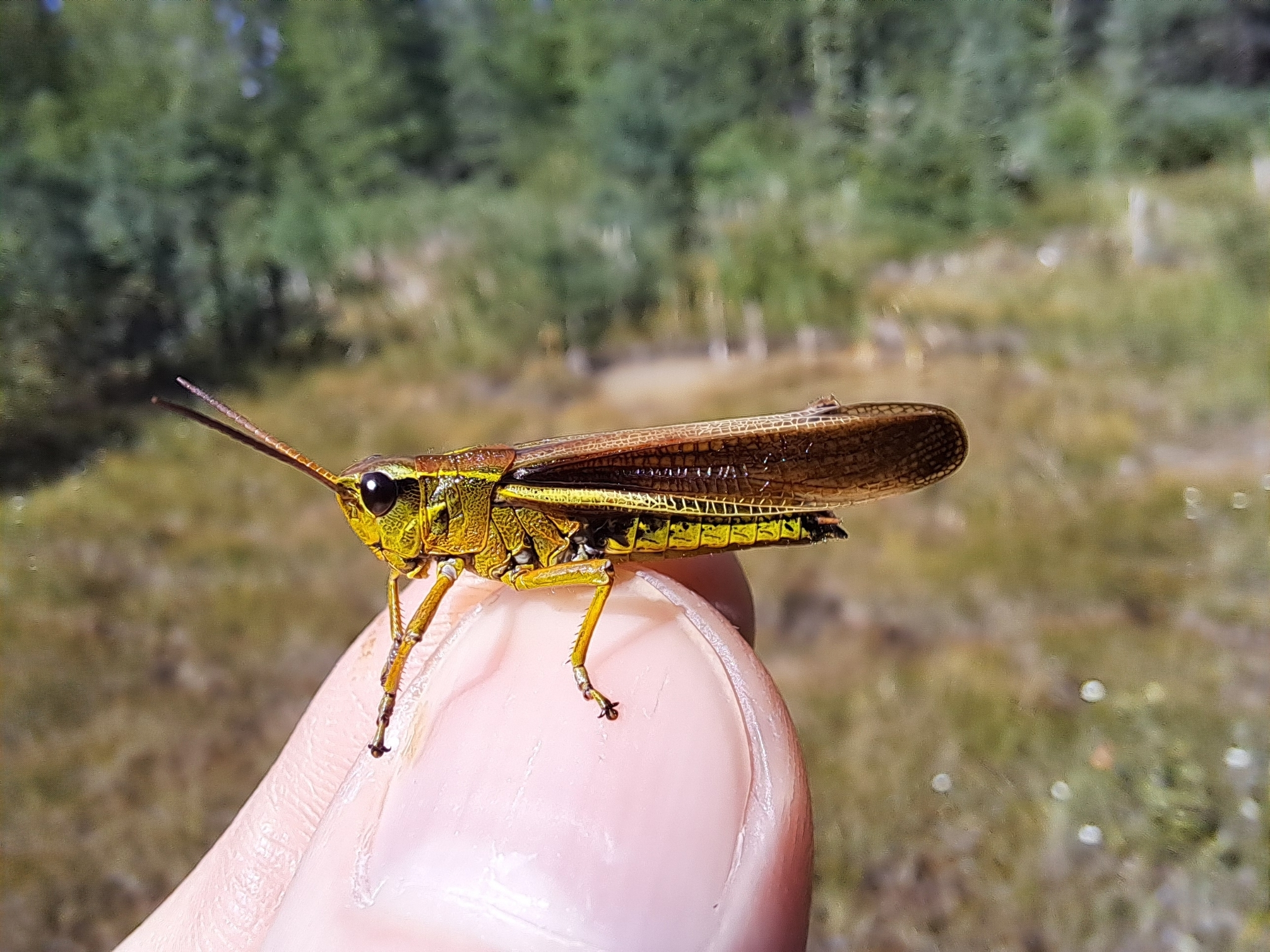
- Stethophyma lineatum captured by a photographer near Acheson, Alberta

Conservation status
- Secure (NatureServe)

Scientific classification
- Kingdom: Animalia
- Phylum: Arthropoda
- Clade: Pancrustacea
- Class: Insecta
- Order: Orthoptera
- Suborder: Caelifera
- Family: Acrididae
- Genus: Stethophyma
- Species: S. lineatum

Binomial name
- Stethophyma lineatum (Scudder, 1862)

= Stethophyma lineatum =

Species of band-winged grasshopper

Stethophyma lineatum, the striped sedge grasshopper, is a species of band-winged grasshopper. It is found in North America from Newfoundland through the Great Lakes region to the Yukon.

== Taxonomy ==
Stethophyma lineatum is placed in the Acridid grasshopper family, subfamily Oedipodinae (bandwings), tribe Parapleurini. The species was first described by Samuel Hubbard Scudder in an article published in the 1862 Boston Journal of Natural History. He called his species Arcyptera (Stethophyma) lineata, with the brackets indicating Stethophyma's status than as a subgenus of Arcyptera. A male lectotype from Massachusetts assigned in the late 20th century by Dan Otte is deposited in the Academy of Natural Sciences of Philadelphia. During the later 19th century, Stethophyma began to be referred to as a full genus rather than a subgenus. In 1896, Albert P. Morse published a paper in Psyche: according to him, several species of New England grasshopper had been improperly described as belonging to Arcyptera and Stethophyma. Morse moved these species into the genus Mecostethus, renaming Scudder's species Mecostethus lineatus. Morse's classification only lasted until 1926, however, when Morgan Hebard, in a paper on the Orthoptera of South Dakota, returned it to the genus Stethophyma. An alternate spelling, S. lineata, was used in some sources but is not now widely accepted.

Stethophyma lineatum is a notable example of convergent evolution, being grouped among the Oedipodinae but having some superficial physical characteristics with the Gomphocerinae. The species is commonly known as the "striped sedge grasshopper" or sometimes the "striped sedge locust".

== Description ==
=== Identification ===
Stethophyma lineatum can be recognized by several identifying characteristics, particularly:

- The dorsal side of the prothorax has three lateral carinae cut by three furrows (sulci).
- The aformentioned lateral carinae diverge posteriorly.
- There is a pale, yellowish stripe extending from a spot behind the eye, across the pronotum, and along the anterior margin of the forewings.

== Distribution ==
Stethophyma lineatum is of three Stethophyma species found in North America, the others being S. celatum and S. gracile. S. lineatum is found in all of interior British Columbia and has also been recorded from Vancouver Island and other points west of the Coast Mountains. In the adjacent Yukon territory, it is found primarily south of the 55th parallel, but has been found from Halfway Lakes (in Elsa, by the Silver Trail), about 63.7°N. S. lineatum was formerly believed to be found in Alaska, based on records from Fairbanks and Beaver. A 1997 article by Vernon Vickery suggested that it might be a stray adventive specimen, but a 2021 paper investigating the Orthoptera of Alaska made a morphological and molecular comparison and identified them instead as Stethophyma grossum, a species hitherto only recorded in Eurasia. The authors went on to suggest that the disjunct Halfway Lakes specimen be reexamined in light of their identification. In the Northwest Territories, the species has only been collected in the area of Great Slave Lake. There is one unusual record of S. lineatum from Resolute Bay, Nunavut, that was "undoubtedly an accidental introduction by aircraft" according to Vickery. It is widespread in the provinces of Canada, being found throughout Alberta, Saskatchewan, and Manitoba, with fewer records in their northern reaches. The grasshoppers are found throughout Ontario and the Great Lakes region, extending into the Midwest of the United States: into Minnesota as far south and west as Minneapolis; throughout Wisconsin and Michigan; and at the south edge of Lake Michigan into Indiana and Illinois. They are found in southern to central Quebec and have been recorded from Anticosti Island. There are also records throughout Newfoundland. Southwards, S. lineatum is found in all of the Maritimes and southwards, through New England as far south as the state of New Jersey. A 1930 paper on British Columbian orthopterans asserted that S. lineatum was found southwards on the west coast into Washington state and, inland, as far south as Nebraska. The Global Biodiversity Information Facility contains only one record from each, one near Cape Alava in the far northwest of Washington state, and one in Cambridge, Nebraska; a 1925 paper claimed that the grasshoppers were found in the eastern part of that state. The GBIF also includes one record from Bozeman, Montana.

=== Conservation ===
NatureServe Conservation Status
Territories	Statuses
Alberta and Manitoba	S4 S5
Ontario and Island of Newfoundland	S4
British Columbia and Saskatchewan	S3 S5
Northwest Territories	S2 S3
Indiana	S1 S2

== Bibliography ==
- Catling, P. M. (2008). Grasshoppers and related insects (Ulonata) of the Northwest Territories and adjacent regions (PDF). Yellowknife: Environment and Natural Resources, Government of the Northwest Territories. pp. 29–30, 66.
- Storozhenko, Sergey Yurievich; Otte, Daniel (Feb 1994). "Review of the Genus Stethophyma Fischer (Orthoptera: Acrididae: Acridinae: Parapleurini)". Journal of Orthoptera Research. 2. Orthopterists' Society: 61–4.
- Vickery, Vernon R. (1997). "Orthopteroid Insects (Orthoptera) of the Yukon" (PDF). In Danks, H. V.; Downes, J.A. (eds.). Insects of the Yukon. Ottawa: Biological Survey of Canada (Terrestrial Arthropods). pp. 223–249.
