= Gorokhov =

Gorokhov (Russian: Горохов, from горох meaning peas) is a Russian masculine surname, its feminine counterpart is Gorokhova. It may refer to:

- Alexei Gorokhov (1927–1999), Soviet violinist
- Andrey Gorokhov — several people
- Elena Gorokhova (1933–2014), Russian painter
- Elena Gorokhova (writer) (born 1955), writer
- Galina Gorokhova (born 1938), Russian fencer
- Georgiy Gorokhov (born 1993), Russian pole vaulter
- Igor Gorokhov (born 1990), Russian ice hockey defenceman
- Ilya Gorokhov (born 1977), Russian ice hockey defenceman
- Ivan Gorokhov (painter) (1863-1934), Russian painter
- Leonid Gorokhov (born 1967), Russian cellist
- Sergei Gorokhov (born 1981), Russian football player
- Vladimir Gorokhov (1911–1985), Soviet football player and coach

== See also ==
- Horokhiv
