= Andrey Vasil'evich Gorochov =

Russian entomologist

Andrei Vasilyevich Gorokhov
- Андрей Васильевич Горохов
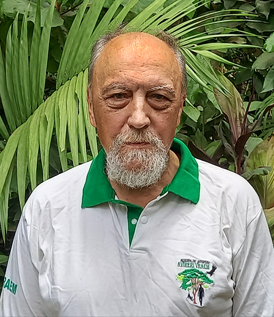
- Born: 19 September 1952 (age 73); Tuapse, Soviet Union
- Education: Orenburg State Pedagogical University
- Known for: Orthoptera systematics
- Scientific career
- Fields: Entomology, paleontology
- Workplaces: Zoological Institute of the Russian Academy of Sciences

Andrei Vasilyevich Gorokhov (Russian: Андрей Васильевич Горохов; born 19 September 1952) is a Soviet and Russian entomologist and paleontologist, Doctor of Biological Sciences, and chief research scientist at the Zoological Institute of the Russian Academy of Sciences. He specializes in the systematics of Orthoptera.

== Biography ==
Gorokhov was born on 19 September 1952 in Tuapse.

He graduated from Orenburg State Pedagogical University with degrees in biology and chemistry. During his student years, he participated in student scientific societies and expeditions to Orenburg Oblast, Kazakhstan, and Central Asia. In 1974, he entered the postgraduate programme of the Zoological Institute of the Academy of Sciences of the Soviet Union, and in 1980 successfully defended his Candidate of Sciences dissertation on crickets (Grylloidea) of the fauna of Central Asia. During this period and subsequently, he participated in a number of expeditions to the southern regions of the Soviet Union, including Turkmenistan, Tajikistan, Kazakhstan, Uzbekistan, Azerbaijan, Armenia, Georgia, Crimea, Primorsky Krai, and the Kuril Islands, conducted by the Zoological Institute in cooperation with local scientific institutions.

Since 1981, Gorokhov has worked at the Zoological Institute in its Laboratory of Insect Systematics, holding positions as junior, senior, leading, and chief research scientist. From 1985 to 1990, he participated in the international Soviet–Mongolian and Soviet–Vietnamese zoological expeditions to Mongolia and Vietnam.

In 1991, he was awarded the degree of Doctor of Biological Sciences. His doctoral dissertation was published in 1995 as a two-volume work on the systematics and evolution of the suborder Ensifera. In the same year, Gorokhov became head of the Orthoptera Department at the Zoological Institute and curator of Russia's principal reference collection of these insects.

== Scientific interests ==
Gorokhov's subsequent research was associated with tropical studies in Southeast Asia, New Guinea, Turkey, South and Central America, Africa, and Madagascar. He undertook approximately 20 expeditions to countries in these regions and studied extensive collections obtained during them. As a result of this work, together with his earlier research, Gorokhov discovered and described more than 3,000 taxa new to science, ranging from subfamilies and tribes to genera and species. He also revised or established the taxonomic position of numerous previously described taxa. To better understand evolutionary trends in morphology, phylogenetic relationships among higher taxa, and the geographical history of Orthoptera, he made extensive use of paleontological data and studied newly discovered fossil material. This work led to the identification of ancestral taxa for several branches of Orthoptera, the description of more than 10 new families and superfamilies of fossil Orthoptera, and the description of taxa belonging to other ancient orthopteroid insect orders within Polyneoptera. He also proposed several new patterns and theoretical aspects of biological evolution, including the concept of genital clocks, oscillatory and progressive forms of evolution, the analysis of evolutionary scenarios as a method of phylogenetic research, and the use of taxonomic ranks as a basis for the mathematization of biodiversity.

Beginning in 2008, Gorokhov and V. V. Izerzky began a study of the Orthoptera of Peru. Four expeditions were organized in the provinces of Satipo and Atalaya, as well as in the Morona River region and the upper Amazon basin, in 2008, 2010–2011, 2017, and 2018–2019. The results of this fieldwork were reported in 17 publications containing extensive new data on Peruvian Orthoptera, including descriptions of approximately 80 taxa new to science and reviews of the Peruvian cricket fauna of the subfamilies Podoscirtinae and Phalangopsinae.

Approximately 30 taxa have been named in honor of Gorokhov, including genera and species as well as the fossil family Gorochoviidae.

Gorokhov has served on the scientific councils of the Zoological Institute and on the editorial boards of the journals Proceedings of the Zoological Institute of the Russian Academy of Sciences and Zoosystematica Rossica. He has also served on the editorial board of Far Eastern Entomologist.

He was among the organizers of congresses of the Russian Entomological Society.

== Taxa named in honor of A. V. Gorokhov ==
=== Genera ===
- Andrea Mistshenko (Orthoptera)
- Gorochovius Xie, Zheng & Li (Orthoptera)
- Gorochovitettix Storozhenko & Pushkar (Orthoptera)
- Gorochovia Storozhenko (Grylloblattida)
- Gorochoviella Storozhenko (Grylloblattida)

=== Species ===
- Andrea gorochovi Mistshenko (Orthoptera)
- Tettilobus gorochovi Podgornaja (Orthoptera)
- Cearagryllus gorochovi Martins-Neto (Orthoptera)
- Bergiola gorochovi Garai (Orthoptera)
- Mesagraecia gorochovi Ingrisch (Orthoptera)
- Hueikaeana andreji Ingrisch (Orthoptera)
- Apotetamenus gorochovi Cadena-Castaneda (Orthoptera)
- Aphonomorphus gorochovi Cadena-Castaneda & Noriega (Orthoptera)
- Mikluchomaklaia gorochovi Otte (Orthoptera)
- Anacranae gorochovi Storozhenko (Orthoptera)
- Toacris gorochovi Storozhenko (Orthoptera)
- Pteronemobius gorochovi Storozhenko (Orthoptera)
- Rostella gorochovi Storozhenko (Orthoptera)
- Mongoloidelis gorochovi Storozhenko (Grylloblattida)
- Deroplatys gorochovi Anisyutkin (Dictyoptera)
- Calolamprodes gorochovi Anisyutkin (Dictyoptera)
- Pseudophoraspis gorochovi Anisyutkin (Dictyoptera)
- Rhabdoblatta gorochovi Anisyutkin (Dictyoptera)
- Pycnoscelis gorochovi Anisyutkin (Dictyoptera)
- Melittia gorochovi Gorbunov (Lepidoptera)
- Nanomyrmacyba gorochovi Korotyaev (Coleoptera)
- Mecysmoderes gorochovi Korotyaev (Coleoptera)
- Oligoneurus gorochovi Belokobylskij (Hymenoptera)
- Ipodoryctes andreii Belokobylskij (Hymenoptera)
- Incurvarion gorochovi Kasparyan (Hymenoptera)
- Isomya gorochovi Verves (Diptera)

== Publications ==
Gorokhov is the author of more than 300 publications, including books and scientific and popular-science articles.

- Gorokhov, A. V. Sistema i evolyutsiya pryamokrylykh podotryada Ensifera (Orthoptera). Chast 1 [Systematics and evolution of Orthoptera of the suborder Ensifera (Orthoptera). Part 1]. Proceedings of the Zoological Institute of the Russian Academy of Sciences, vol. 260, no. 1. Saint Petersburg, 1995. 225 pp.
- Gorokhov, A. V. Sistema i evolyutsiya pryamokrylykh podotryada Ensifera (Orthoptera). Chast 2 [Systematics and evolution of Orthoptera of the suborder Ensifera (Orthoptera). Part 2]. Proceedings of the Zoological Institute of the Russian Academy of Sciences, vol. 260, no. 2. Saint Petersburg, 1995. 214 pp.
- Gorokhov, A. V. Materials on the fauna and systematics of Stenopelmatoidea (Orthoptera) of Indochina and some other territories. XI. Entomological Review, 2013, vol. 92, no. 3, pp. 537–554.
- Gorokhov, A. V. New and little-known crickets of the subfamily Phalangopsinae (Orthoptera, Gryllidae). 5. Neotropical taxa of the tribe Paragryllini. Zoological Journal, 2009, vol. 88, no. 7, pp. 809–822.
- Gorokhov, A. V. On Permian and Triassic stick insects (Phasmoptera) from Eurasia. Paleontological Journal, 1994, no. 4, p. 64.
- Gorochov, A. V. A new, enigmatic family for a new genus and species of Polyneoptera from the Upper Permian of Russia. ZooKeys, 2011, vol. 130, pp. 131–136.
- Gorochov, A. V. & Tan, M. K. New crickets of the subfamilies Phaloriinae and Pteroplistinae (Orthoptera: Gryllidae) from Singapore. Zootaxa, 2012, no. 3525, pp. 18–34.

== Membership in professional societies ==
- Member of the All-Union Entomological Society (1974–1992)
- Member of the Russian Entomological Society (since 1992)
- Member of the Orthopterists' Society (since 1990)
- Founding member of the International Paleoentomological Society (since 2001)
