= Andrey Gorokhov =

Andrey or Andrei Gorokhov may refer to:

- Andrey Gorokhov (politician) (born 1960), Russian politician
- Andrey Gorokhov (bobsledder) (born 1968), Russian bobsledder
- Andrey Vasil'evich Gorochov (born 1952), Soviet and Russian entomologist and paleontologist
