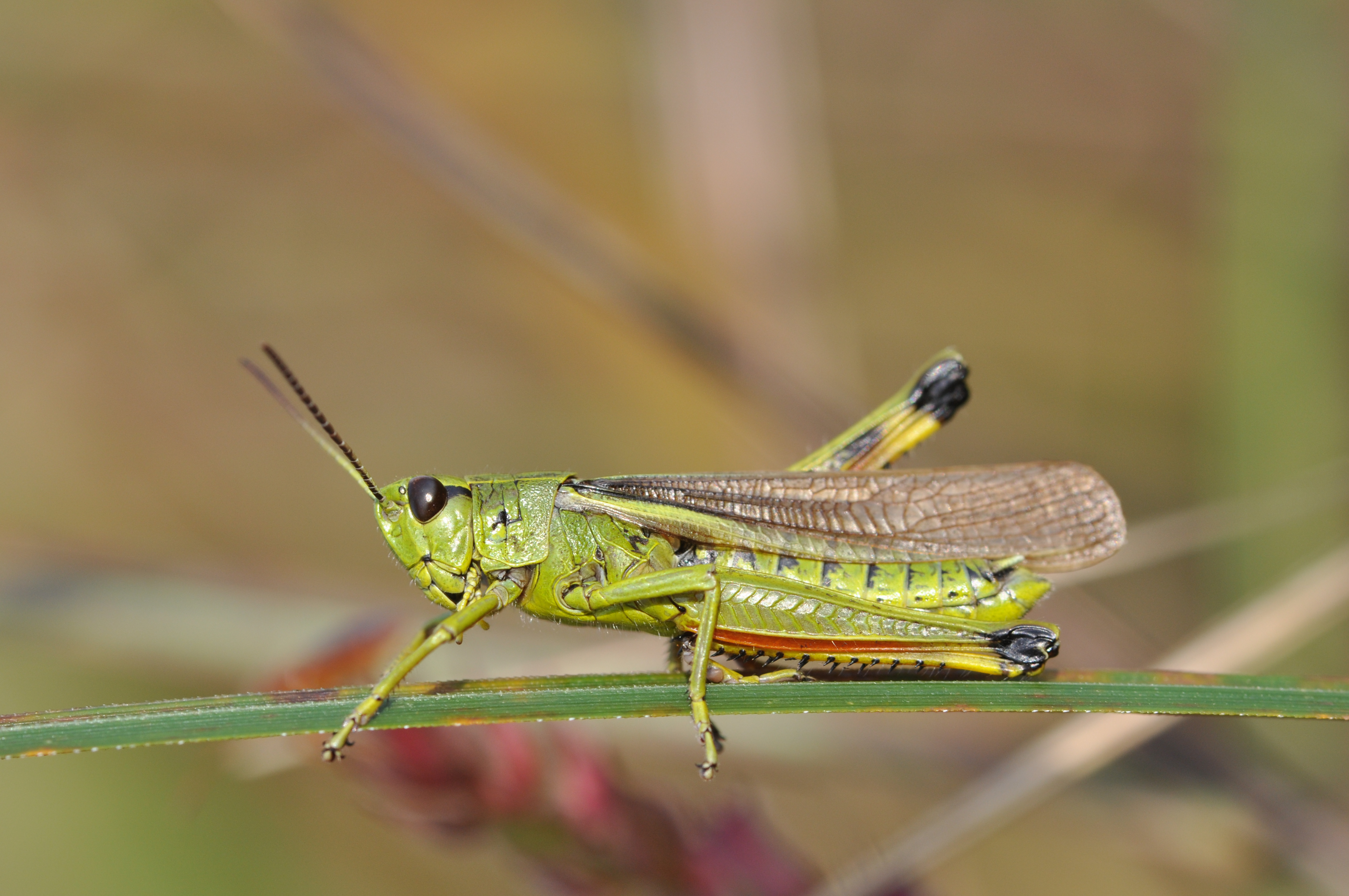
- In Germany

Scientific classification
- Kingdom: Animalia
- Phylum: Arthropoda
- Clade: Pancrustacea
- Class: Insecta
- Order: Orthoptera
- Suborder: Caelifera
- Family: Acrididae
- Genus: Stethophyma
- Species: S. grossum

Binomial name
- Stethophyma grossum (Linnaeus, 1758)

Synonyms
- List: Acridium grossum (Linnaeus, 1758); Acrydium rubripes' De Geer, 1773; Euryphymus rubripes (De Geer, 1773); Gryllus flavipes Gmelin, 1790; Gryllus germanicus Stoll, C., 1813; Gryllus grossum Linnaeus, 1758; Mecostethus grossus (Linnaeus, 1758); Oedipoda grossa (Linnaeus, 1758); Stethophyma flavipes (Gmelin, 1788); Stethophyma germanicus (Stoll, C., 1813); Stethophyma rubripes (De Geer, 1773)

= Large marsh grasshopper =

Species of grasshopper

The large marsh grasshopper (Stethophyma grossum) is a species of grasshopper belonging to the family Acrididae.

== Taxonomy ==
The large marsh grasshopper was first described in the 10th edition of Systema Naturae, which was written by Swedish biologist Carl Linnaeus in 1758. Linnaeus considered all orthopteran insects to be members of the genus Gryllus, and gave the scientific name Gryllus grossus to this species. Later authors split the orthopterans into multiple genera, and the large marsh grasshopper would therefore be reclassified. French zoologist Pierre André Latreille moved the species into Acrydium in 1804, renaming it as Acrydium grossum, while French entomologist Jean Guillaume Audinet-Serville assigned it to Oedipoda in 1839 under the name Oedipoda grossa, and German entomologist Franz Xaver Fieber considered it a member of Mecostethus which he renamed as Mecostethus grossus in 1853. Later that year, German zoologist Leopold Heinrich Fischer published a book reviewing the orthopterans of Europe in which he determines that the large marsh grasshopper cannot be assigned to any existing genus. He therefore established the genus Stethophyma, of which this species was designated as the type species, renaming the large marsh grasshopper as Stethophyma grossum. In 1983, British entomologist Judith Marshall reanalysed the original specimens studied by Linnaeus and designated one kept by the Linnean Society of London as the lectotype specimen, as Linnaeus had studied multiple specimens without designating one as a single type specimen. The chosen lectotype is the body of a female catalogued as "No. 58", which Marshall noted has been partly damaged by beetles and the left antenna is missing.

Several authors have established new species based on grasshopper specimens before these were later realized to be large marsh grasshoppers. Swedish entomologist Charles De Geer established a species which he named Acrydium rubripes in 1773, and naturalist Caspar Stoll gave the name Gryllus (Locusta) germanicus in 1813 to a grasshopper species he established. The type specimens of both these species were collected in Europe and are now probably lost. When establishing the genus Stethophyma in 1853, Fischer declared that neither of these supposed species were significantly different from the large marsh grasshopper and therefore should be considered junior synonyms of S. grossum. In addition, German naturalist Johann Friedrich Gmelin erected a species named Gryllus flavipes in 1789, which was synonymized with S. grossum by British entomologist William Forsell Kirby in 1910.

== Description ==
The large marsh grasshopper is a large insect, with females reaching a body length of 25.9–39.1 mm (1.02–1.54 in), though males are smaller and only grow 11.8–25 mm (0.46–0.98 in) long. In the United Kingdom, this size makes it the largest of the native grasshopper species. Most individuals have olive brown to greenish yellow colouration, but individuals with varying amounts of purple have also been reported. In England, only females of the purple form have been found, though male purple individuals are known from other locations such as Ireland. A slightly raised keel is present on the middle of the pronotum (the upper front part of the thorax), and another slightly incurved keel is located on each side of it. Behind each eye there is a black stripe and a pale line, the latter stretching to the upper edges of the wings. The knees of the hind legs are black, followed by black and yellow bands on the upper parts of the tibia and femur (the two largest segments of the hind leg). These bands are more distinct on the side of the leg held inwards near the abdomen than on the outer surfaces. The hind femur has a bright red underside, while the yellow hind tibia bears black spines. Unlike in many other grasshopper species, the hind femur of the large marsh grasshopper lacks stridulatory pegs (bumps used to produce sound). Adults have four well-developed wings that stretch past the hind limbs (and often past the abdomen tip) when the insect is at rest, and a pale yellow line is present on the front edge of the front wings. Males have long cerci (tail-like paired appendages) and a pointed subgenital plate at the tip of the abdomen, while females have short cerci and a long ovipositor (egg-laying tube).

== Distribution and habitat ==
S. grossum is found throughout Europe, with a few records from western Asia. In the British Isles it is restricted to the New Forest, Dorset, and Somerset Wells and Ireland. It is the largest species of grasshopper to be found in the British Isles.

The habitat is typically wet meadow and marsh throughout its range. In southern England, the species is most often found in "quaking" sphagnum moss bogs.

Close-Up of a Stethophyma grossum

== Biology ==
The large marsh grasshopper is a short-lived animal, completing its life cycle in one year and emerging later in the year than most other grasshopper species; adults begin to appear only in late July or early August, and are present until late September or October. During this period, adult males produce "songs" to attract mates. The mating "song" consists of distinctive popping sounds, typically with two or three pops per second. As many as eight pops can be made in one sequence, but this may vary. While most grasshopper species produce sounds using a row of bumps on the hind legs called the stridulatory pegs, the large marsh grasshopper does not have such pegs. Instead, its sounds are produced by using the tibiae of the hind legs to kick the wing tips. This insect prefers warm and sunny conditions, and males often stop "singing" if it is cloudy.

After mating, the female large marsh grasshopper lays elongated egg pods in soil at the bases of tussocks of grass, with each pod able to contain as many as 14 eggs. An egg pod measures 10–16 mm (0.39–0.63 in), while each individual egg is roughly 1.5 mm (0.059 in) long and 6.5 mm (0.26 in) wide.The adult grasshoppers die off during the winter, while the buried eggs overwinter in a dormant state before hatching the following year from late May onwards as nymphs. These nymphs emerge from their eggs and wriggle out of the soil in a worm-like form while encased in a cuticular covering which they shed upon reaching the surface, allowing the legs to stretch out and the insect to be recognisable as a tiny first-instar grasshopper. The nymphs go through four more instars before becoming adults, moulting between each one, and small wing buds can be seen by the second or third instar.
