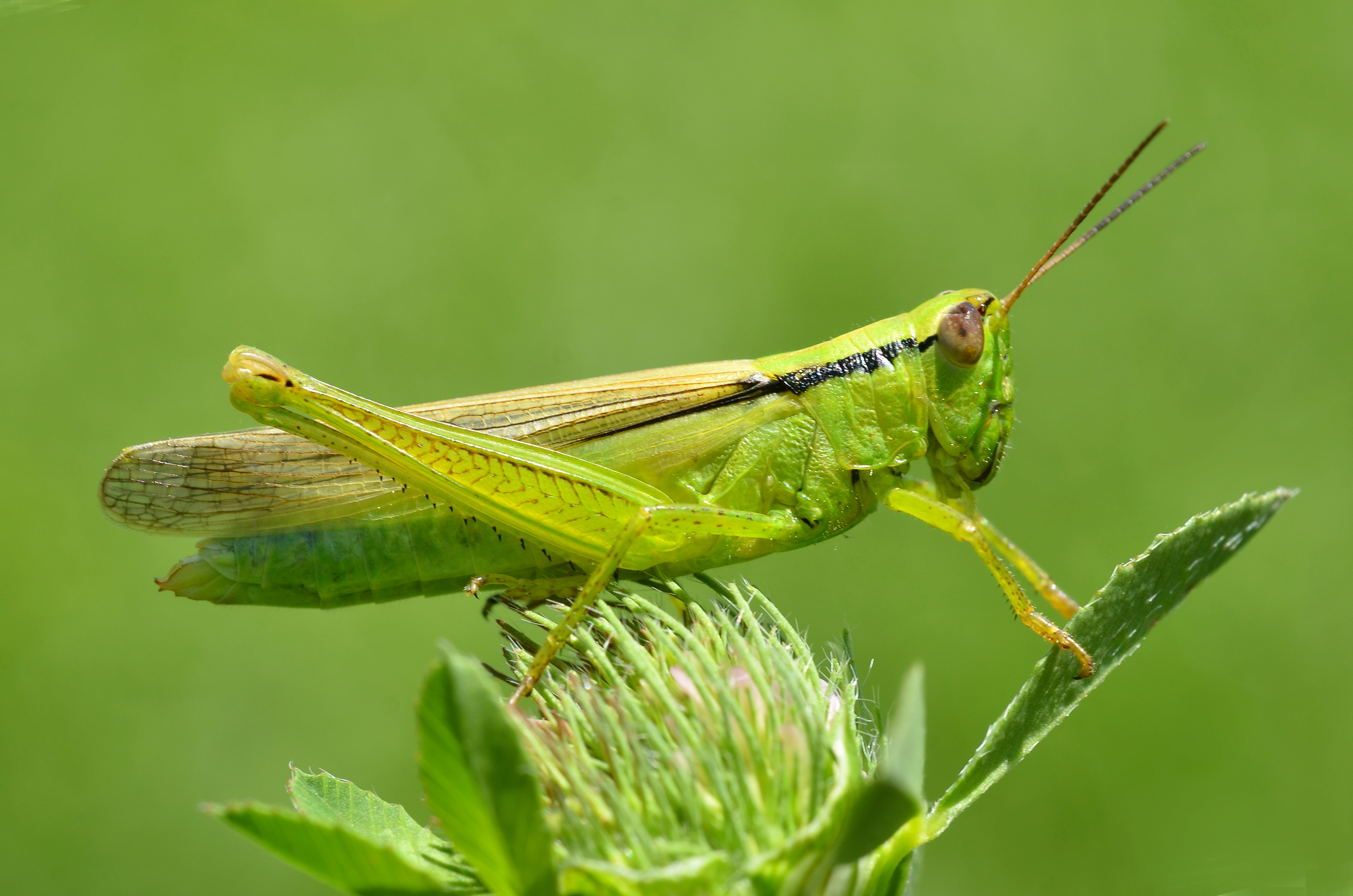
- Mecostethus parapleurus, France

Conservation status
- Least Concern (IUCN 3.1) (Europe regional assessment)

Scientific classification
- Kingdom: Animalia
- Phylum: Arthropoda
- Class: Insecta
- Order: Orthoptera
- Suborder: Caelifera
- Family: Acrididae
- Subfamily: Oedipodinae
- Tribe: Parapleurini
- Genus: Mecostethus
- Species: M. parapleurus

Binomial name
- Mecostethus parapleurus (Hagenbach, 1822)

Synonyms
- Gryllus parapleurus Hagenbach, 1822

= Mecostethus parapleurus =

Species of grasshopper

Mecostethus parapleurus is a species of band-winged grasshopper in the family Acrididae. It is found in the Palearctic.

== Subspecies ==
These subspecies belong to the species Mecostethus parapleurus:

- Mecostethus parapleurus parapleurus (Hagenbach, 1822) (Green Leek Grasshopper)
- Mecostethus parapleurus turanicus Tarbinsky, 1928
