= A Mountain of Crumbs =

Book by Elena Gorokhova

- Author: Elena Gorokhova
- Genre: Memoir
- Publisher: Simon & Schuster
- Publication date: January 12, 2010
- ISBN: 9781439125670

A Mountain of Crumbs is a book by Elena Gorokhova first published in 2010. The book is a memoir of the author's early life in Saint Petersburg (then Leningrad) before she moved to the US in the 1970s. The book's title was from Gorokhova's grandmother, who told her young children not to complain about lack of food and crumbled their black bread and sugar cubes into a "whole mountain of crumbs". Writing in The Guardian, Kapka Kassabova suggests that "one of the book's great feats is to reveal [...] the human scale of this crumbled Soviet world".

It was featured on BBC Radio 4's Book of the Week during August 2015.
