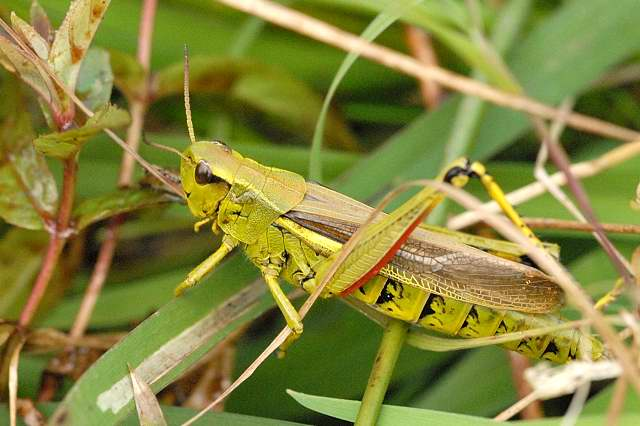
- Stethophyma grossum

Scientific classification
- Domain: Eukaryota
- Kingdom: Animalia
- Phylum: Arthropoda
- Class: Insecta
- Order: Orthoptera
- Suborder: Caelifera
- Family: Acrididae
- Subfamily: Oedipodinae
- Tribe: Parapleurini
- Genus: Stethophyma; Fischer, 1853

Synonyms
- Stetheophyma Fischer, 1853

= Stethophyma =

Genus of grasshoppers

Stethophyma is a genus of grasshoppers in the subfamily Oedipodinae, with species found in Europe, temperate Asia through to Japan and North America.

== Species ==
The Orthoptera Species File lists:

1. Stethophyma celatum Otte, 1979
2. Stethophyma gracile Scudder, 1862
3. Stethophyma grossum Linnaeus, 1758- type species (as Gryllus grossus L.)
4. Stethophyma kevani Storozhenko & Otte, 1994
5. Stethophyma lineatum Scudder, 1862
6. Stethophyma magister Rehn, 1902

== Gallery ==
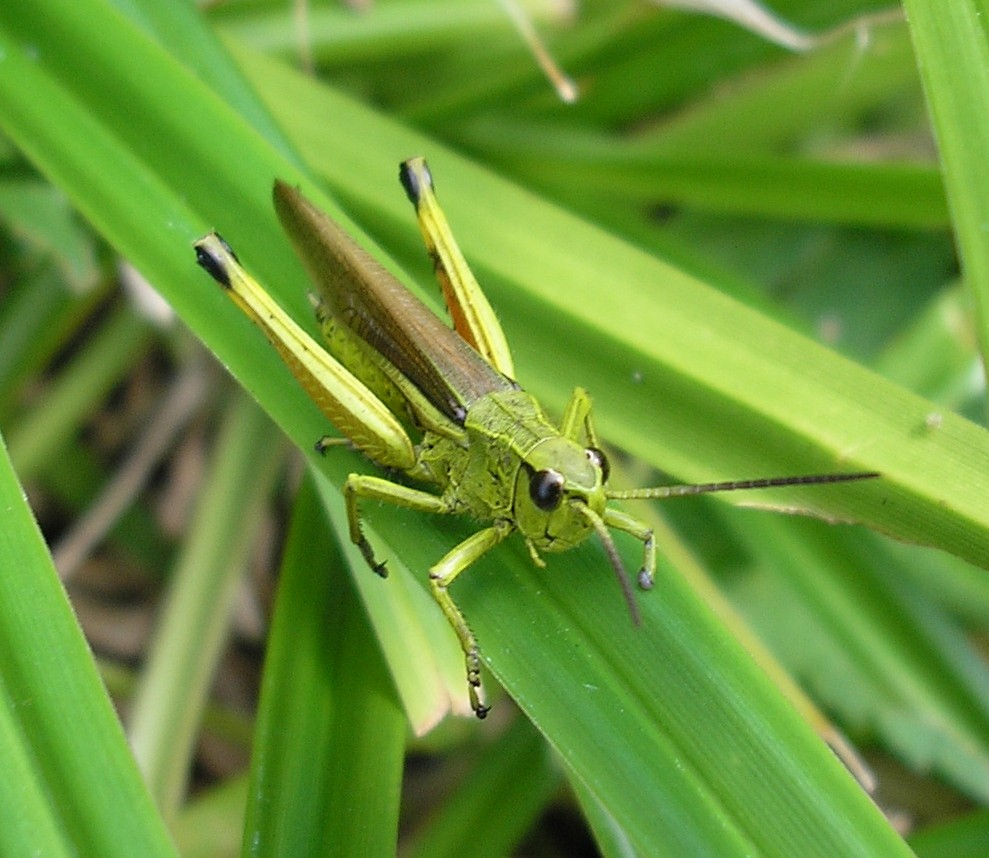
Stethophyma grossum male

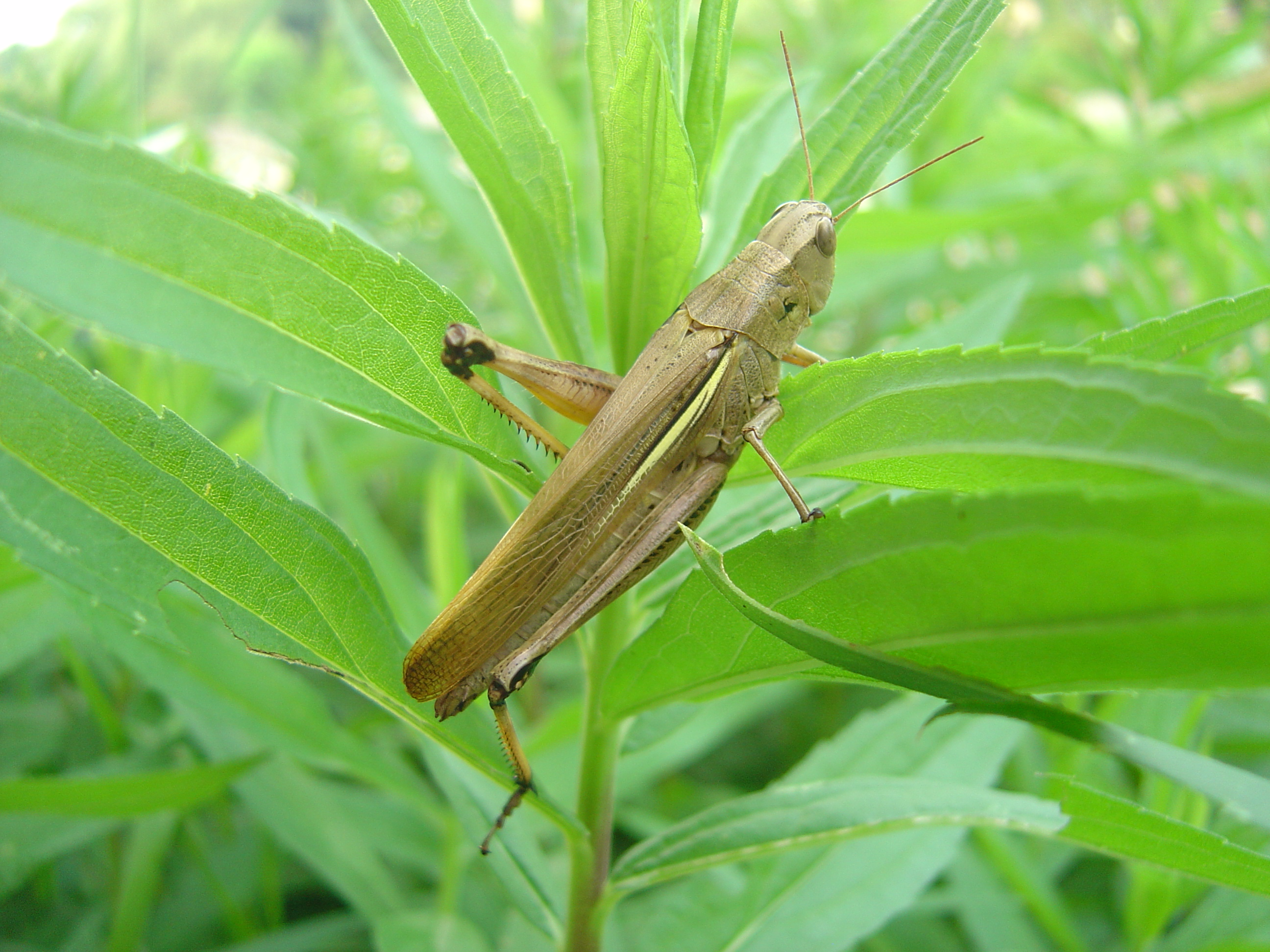
Stethophyma magister
