= Isabella Clara Eugenia =

Sovereign of the Netherlands from 1598 to 1621

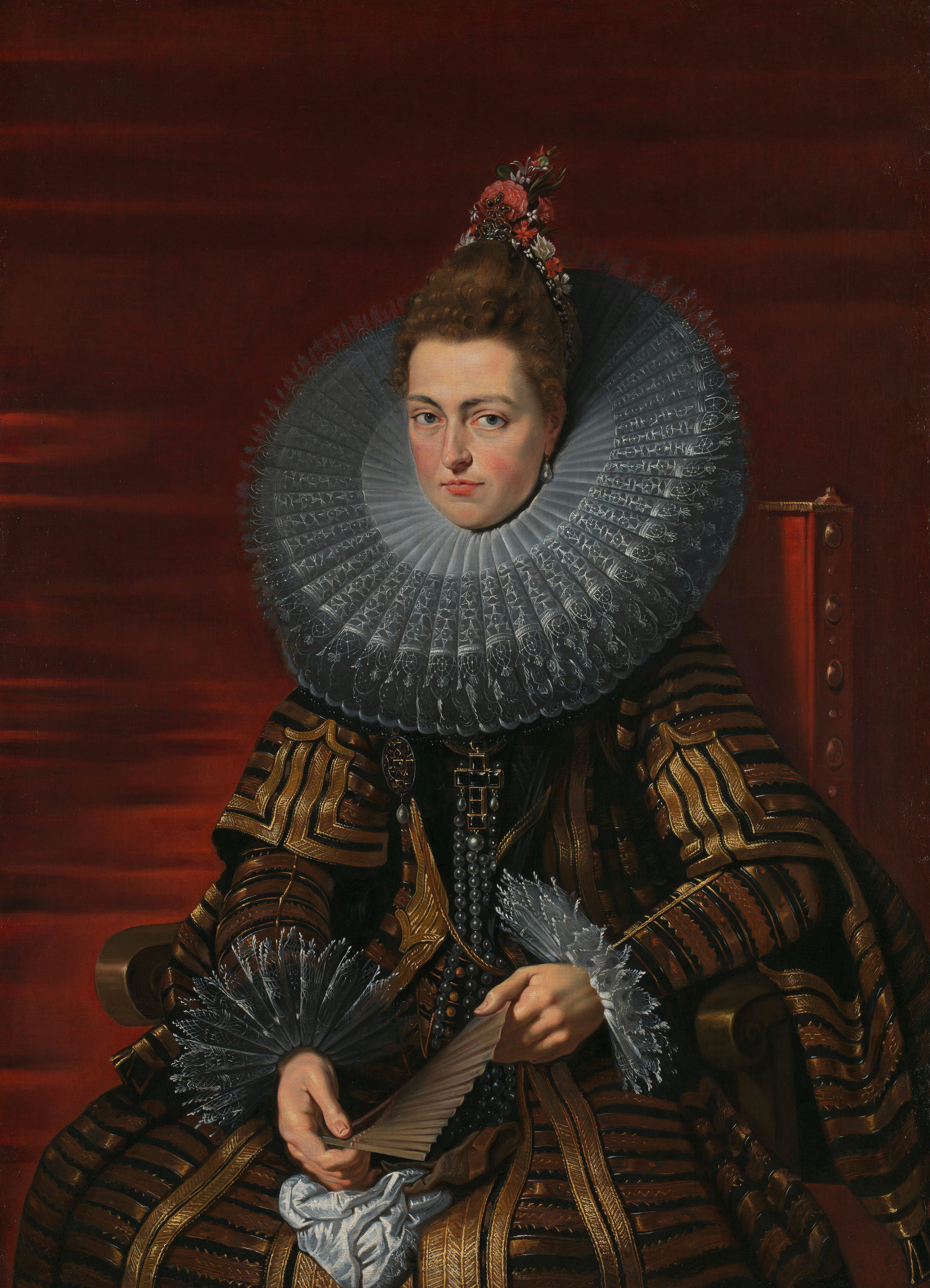
- Portrait by Peter Paul Rubens, c. 1615

Sovereign of the Netherlands (Note: Monarchs from the House of Habsburg ruled the Low Countries with the title of Duke/Duchess of Burgundy.)
- Reign: 6 May 1598 – 13 July 1621
- Predecessor: Philip II
- Successor: Philip IV
- Co-monarch: Albert

Governor of the Habsburg Netherlands
- Reign: 13 July 1621 – 1 December 1633
- Predecessor: Independent Sovereignty of the Netherlands
- Successor: Ferdinand of Austria
- Born: 12 August 1566; Palace of Valsain, Segovia, Crown of Castile
- Died: 1 December 1633 (aged 67); Brussels, Duchy of Brabant, Holy Roman Empire
- Burial: Cathedral of St. Michael and St. Gudula
- Spouse: Albert VII, Archduke of Austria (m. 1599; died 1621)
- House: Habsburg
- Father: Philip II of Spain
- Mother: Elisabeth of Valois
- Religion: Roman Catholicism

Isabella Clara Eugenia (Spanish: Isabel Clara Eugenia; 12 August 1566 – 1 December 1633), sometimes referred to as Clara Isabella Eugenia, was sovereign of the Habsburg Netherlands, and the Free County of Burgundy, from 1598 to 1621, ruling jointly with her husband Archduke Albert VII of Austria. After Albert's death, those regions were returned to the Spanish Habsburgs, and she continued to rule as governess of the Spanish Netherlands until her death.

Their reign is considered the Golden Age of the Habsburg Netherlands, which saw a revival of its economy and arts after a peace was concluded with the break-away Dutch Republic. Isabella was one of the most powerful women in 16th- and 17th-century Europe.

== Early life ==
=== Childhood ===
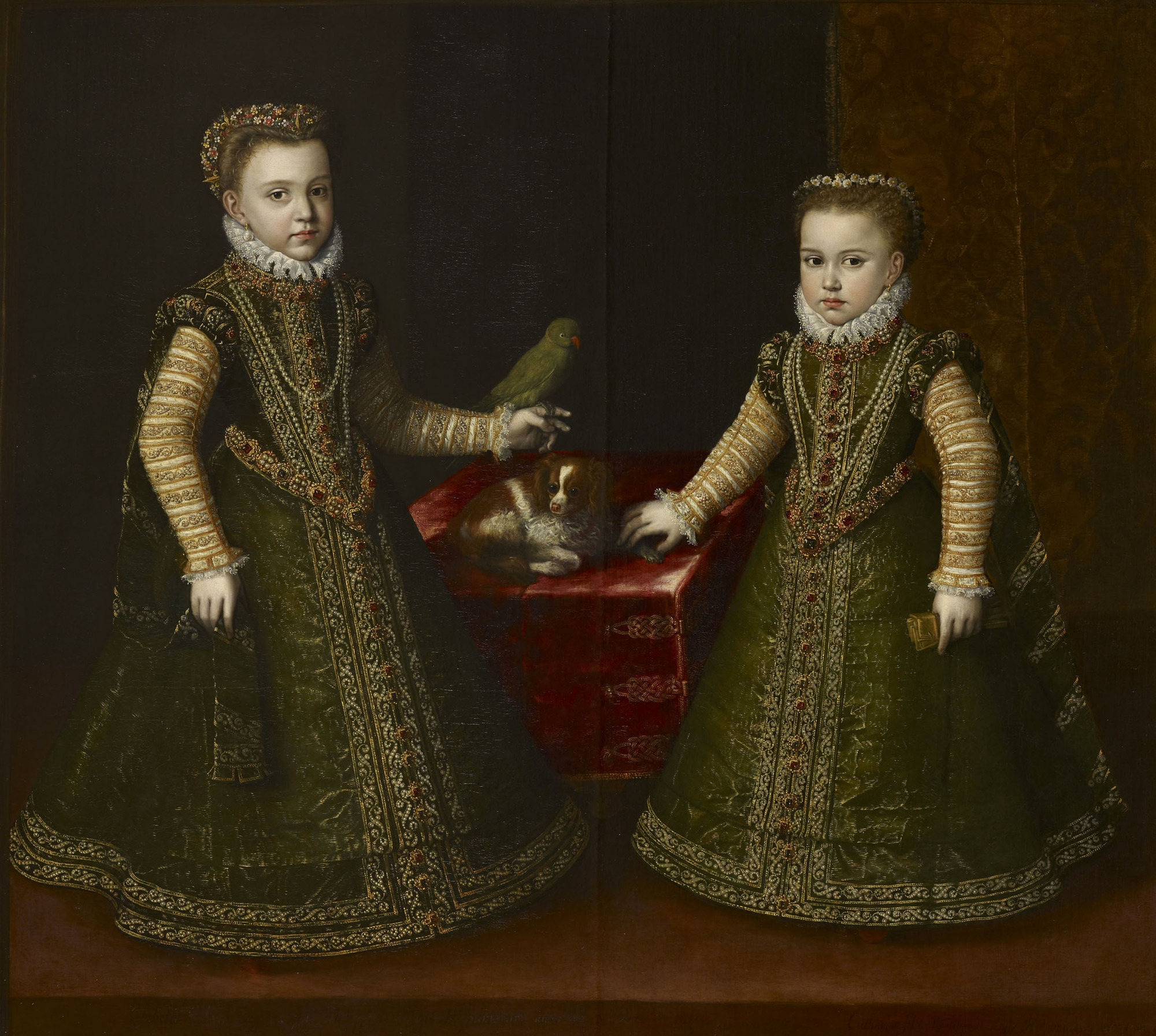
Infantas Isabella Clara Eugenia and Catalina Micaela, by Alonso Sánchez Coello or Jooris van der Straeten, 1570

Isabella Clara Eugenia's coat of arms as Infanta of Spain shows the fleurs-de-lis of Burgundy (modern)

Born at the Palace of Valsain in Segovia on 12 August 1566, Isabella Clara Eugenia was the eldest daughter of King Philip II of Spain and his third wife, Elisabeth of Valois. Philip II was delighted with her birth, writing to his mother-in-law, Catherine de' Medici, that he was as pleased with his daughter as he would have been with a son.

Isabella was baptized on 25 August by the Archbishop of Rossano, and was named Isabella after Isabella the Catholic; Clara after Clare of Assisi, on whose feast day she was born; and Eugenia after Saint Eugene I, whose remains had recently been transferred from the Basilica of Saint-Denis to Toledo by her father. Her godparents were her elder half-brother, Carlos, Prince of Asturias, and her aunt, Joanna, Princess of Portugal.

Isabella's only full-sibling, Catalina Micaela, was born in 1567. Their mother died soon after, on 3 October 1568. Philip II remarried in 1570 to Anna of Austria and fathered five children with her, of whom only the future Philip III survived to adulthood. Isabella enjoyed a close relationship with her step-mother.

Isabella and Catalina were raised at the Royal Alcázar of Madrid under the supervision of their aunt, Joanna, and governess, María Enríquez de Guzmán, Duchess of Alba. Philip II arranged for the sisters to study French and Latin, alongside mathematics, philosophy, and history. Isabella was particularly fond of hunting, fishing, and horse riding.

=== Candidate to the French throne ===
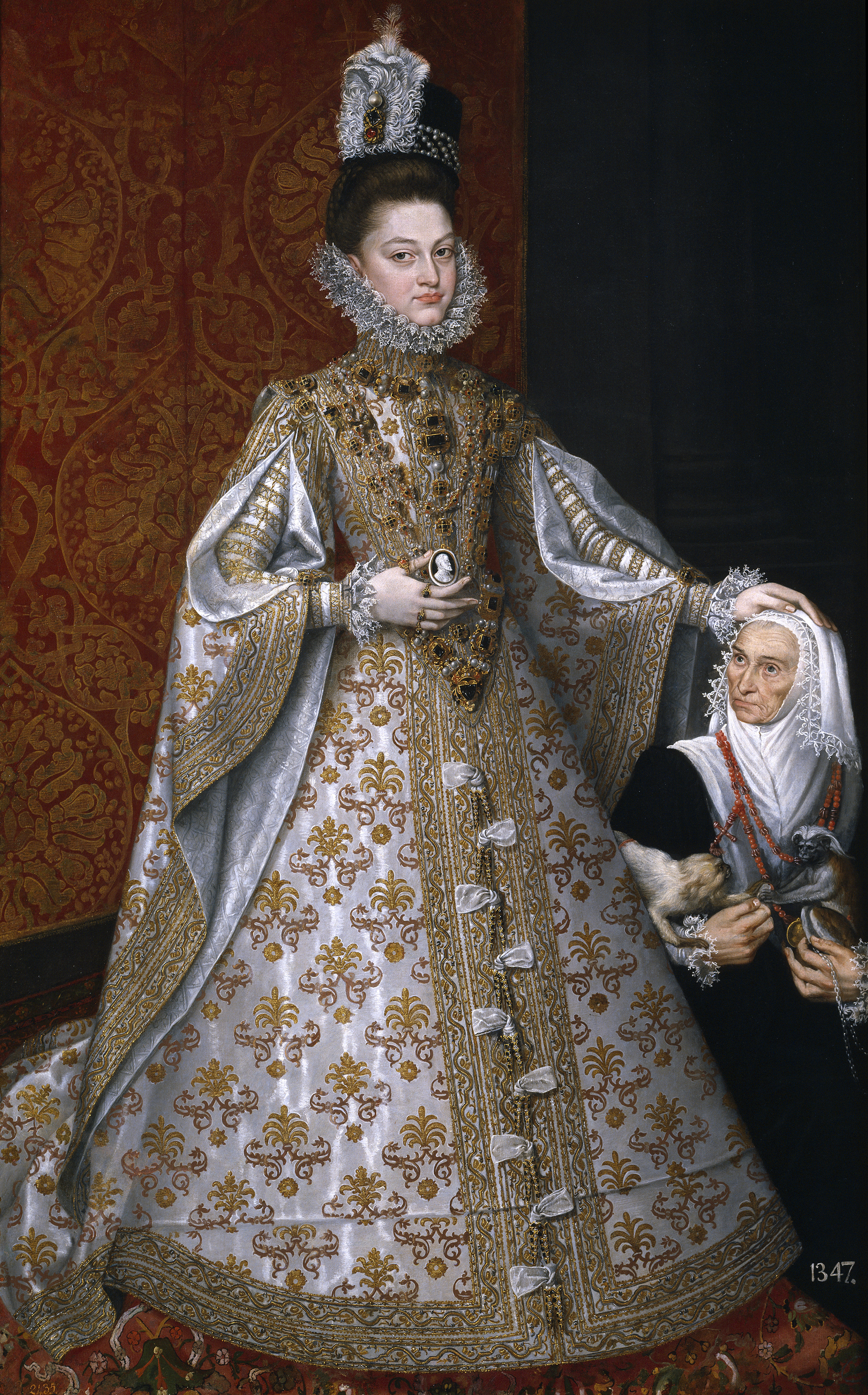
Isabella with a court dwarf around the time of her candidature for the French and English thrones (portrait by Alonso Sánchez Coello, c. 1585–88, Museo del Prado)

After her maternal uncle, Henry III of France, was assassinated by the fanatical young monk Jacques Clément on 2 August 1589, Philip II claimed the French crown on Isabella's behalf despite France's Salic law, which forbade cognatic succession.

At any rate, her mother had ceded any claim to the French crown with her marriage to the Spanish king. However, the Parlement of Paris, in power of the Catholic party, gave verdict that Isabella was "the legitimate sovereign" of France, provided she married a suitable husband in the nobility. Philip's first choice, that of Archduke Ernest of Austria, also a member of the House of Habsburg, was overwhelmingly rejected. Searching for an option more palatable to the French nobility, Philip then chose the Duke of Guise, to the joy of the League, but the Duke of Mayenne blocked the proposed election of a king.

The Huguenot leader, Henry III of Navarre, the actual heir by traditional French inheritance laws, ultimately made his claim to the throne, converted to Catholicism and was crowned in 1594.

=== Candidate to the English throne ===
Following the 1587 execution of Mary, Queen of Scots, Isabella was suggested as a Catholic candidate in the succession to Elizabeth I as she was a legitimate descendant of John of Gaunt (unlike the Tudors) and her father had been King of England by his earlier marriage to Queen Mary I of England.

== Marriage proposals ==
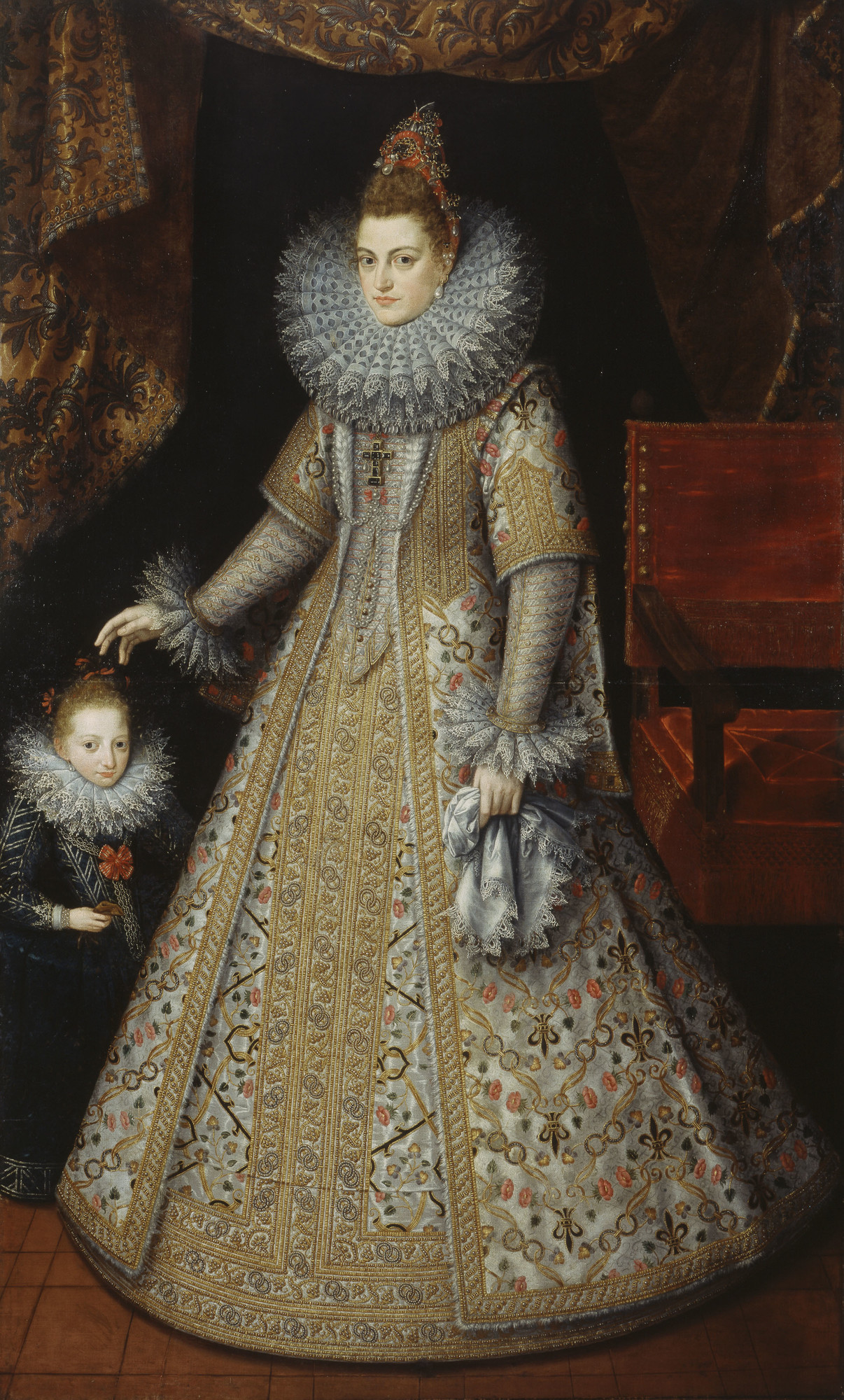
Isabella and Her Court Dwarf by Frans Pourbus the Younger, c. 1599

As Infanta of Spain and Portugal, Isabella was quite eligible on the political marriage market, though she ended up marrying late for her time.

=== Engagement ===
At the age of two, Isabella was promised to marry her cousin Rudolf II, Holy Roman Emperor (18 July 1552 – 20 January 1612), son of her aunt Maria. However, Isabella had to wait for more than 20 years before the eccentric Rudolf declared that he had no intention of marrying anybody. Meanwhile, she served as her father's primary caretaker during the last three years of his life, when he was plagued by gout and frequent illness.

=== Marriage ===
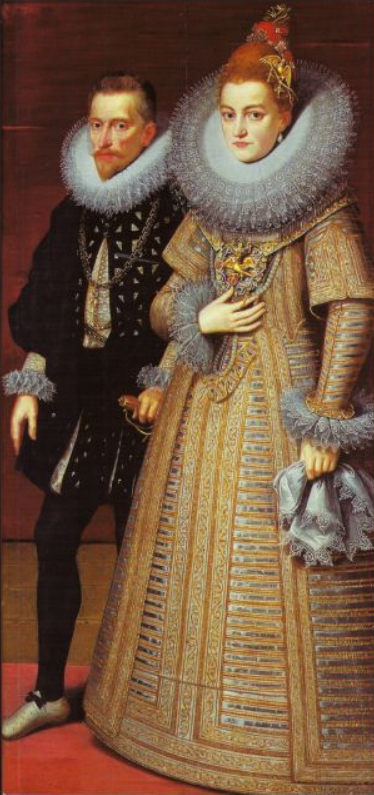
Archdukes Albert and Isabella Clara by Otto van Veen

In 1598, Philip decided to cede the Spanish Netherlands to Isabella on condition that she marry her cousin, Albert VII, Archduke of Austria. He was her former fiancé's younger brother, the former viceroy. They were to reign over the Habsburg Netherlands jointly and be succeeded by their descendants according to the male-preference cognatic primogeniture but should a daughter succeed, she was required to marry the King of Spain or the person chosen by the King of Spain. It was stipulated that, should they have no children, the Netherlands would revert to Spanish Habsburgs upon the death of either spouse.

As Albert was the Archbishop of Toledo, he had to be released from his religious commitments by Pope Clement VIII before the wedding could take place. Shortly before Philip II died on 13 September 1598, he resigned the thrones of all constituent countries in Habsburg Netherlands, including the Free County of Burgundy, in favor of Isabella and her fiancé. The Pope celebrated the union by procuration on 15 November at Ferrera. On 18 April 1599, 33-year-old Isabella married Albert in Valencia.

== Habsburg Netherlands ==
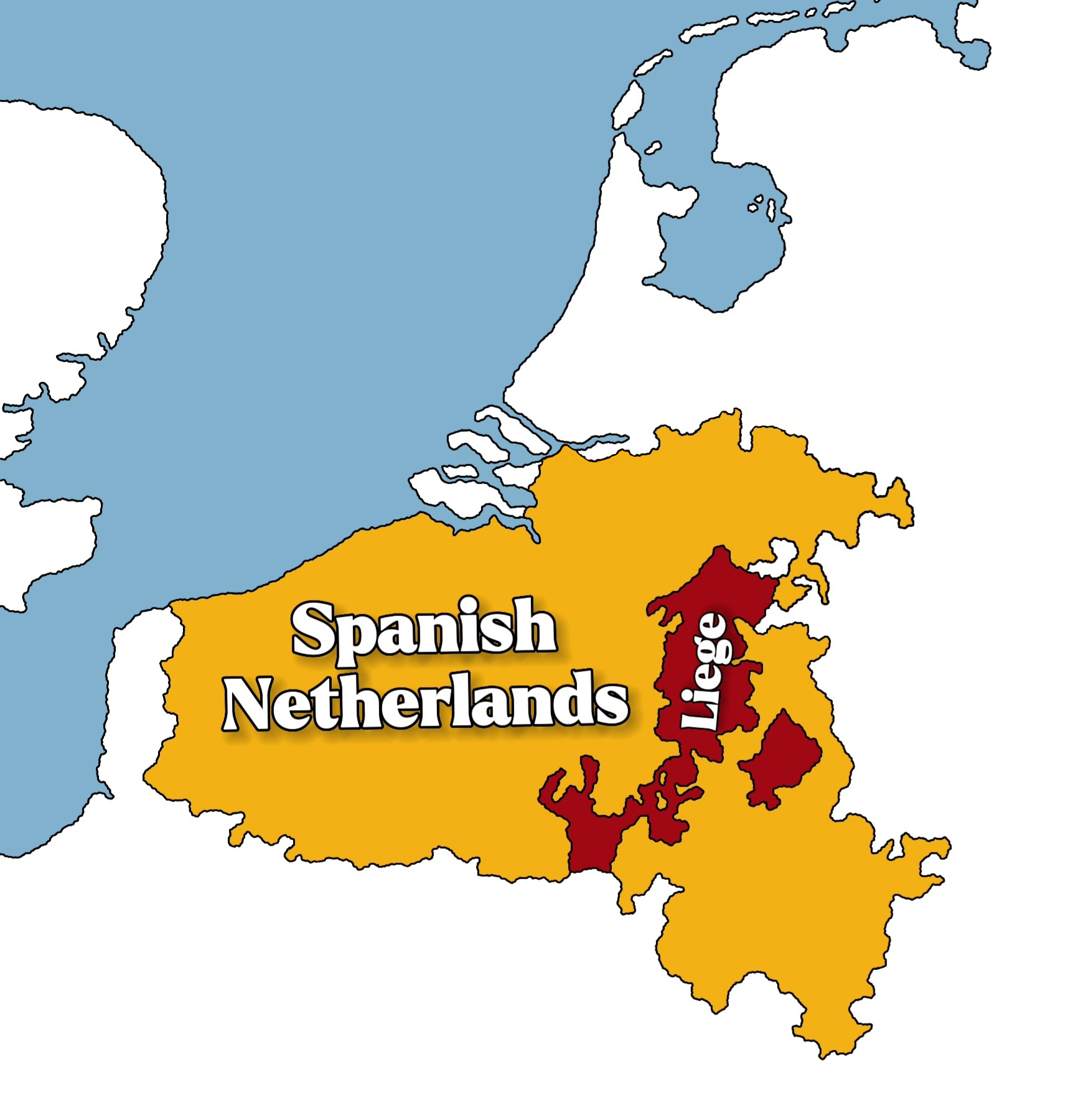
The Spanish Netherlands in 1599

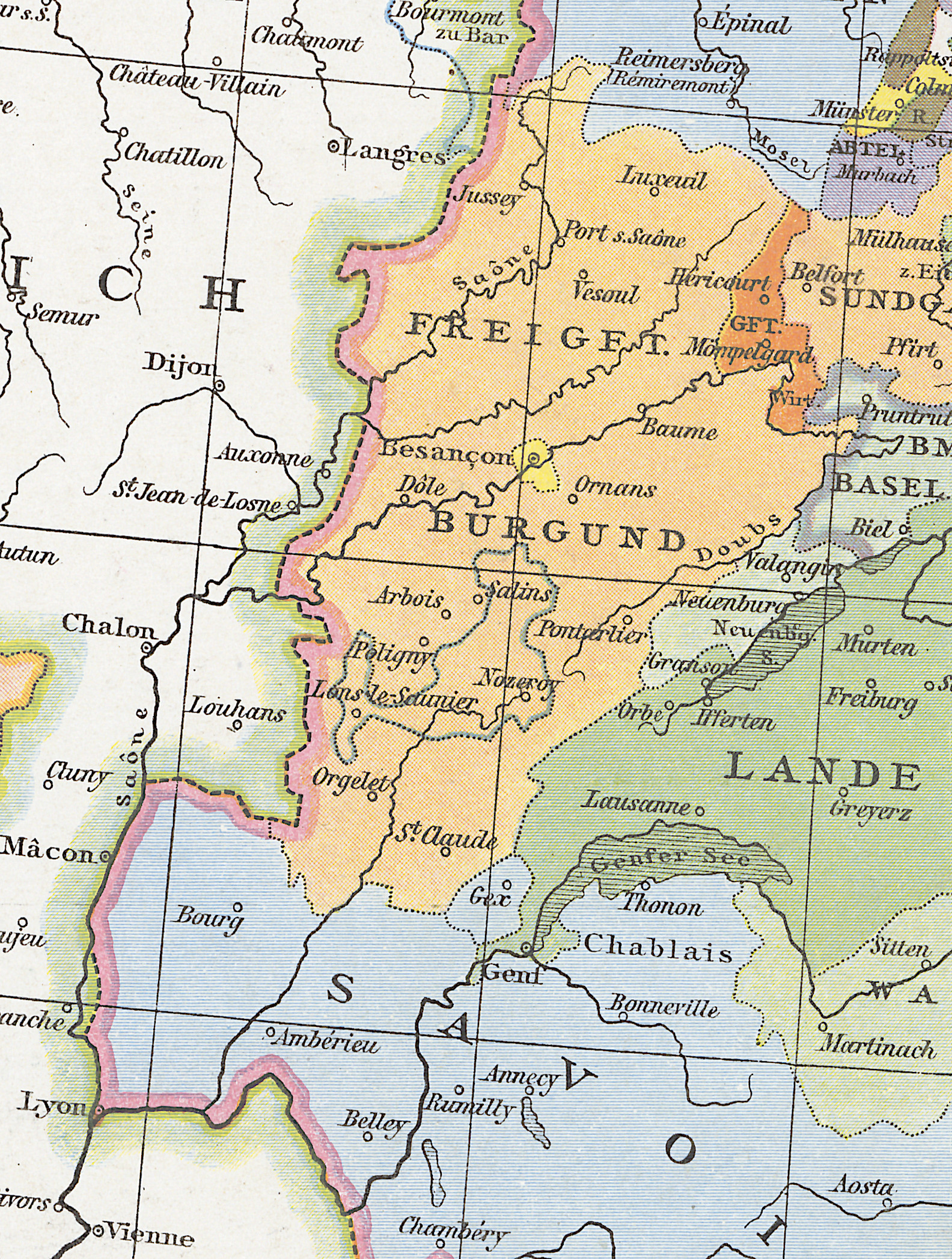
The Free County of Burgundy

Formally from 1598-1599, and effectively beginning from 1601, the Archduke and Archduchess ruled the Spanish Netherlands together. Their reign is a key period in the history of the Spanish Netherlands. After Albert's death in 1621, sovereignty over their lands was returned to Spanish Habsburgs, and Isabella was appointed Governor of the Netherlands on the King of Spain's behalf. She was succeeded as Governor by Cardinal-Infante Ferdinand of Austria, the third son of her half-brother in 1633.

=== Foreign policy ===
Isabella Clara Eugenia's coat of arms as sovereign of the Habsburg Netherlands

The first half of Albert and Isabella's reign was dominated by war. After overtures to the United Provinces and to Queen Elizabeth I of England proved unsuccessful, the Habsburg policy in the Low Countries aimed at regaining the military initiative and isolating the Dutch Republic. The strategy was to force its opponents to the conference table and negotiate from a position of strength.

In pursuit of that goal and to get their political agenda to all Flemish social classes, Albert and Isabella used the most diverse media. Visual art, in the baroque style popularized in the wake of the Counter-Reformation, was the perfect tool. This, coupled with the political configuration of the period, made the Archduke's court at Brussels one of the foremost political and artistic centers in Europe of that time.

It became the testing ground for the Spanish Monarchy's European plans, a boiling pot full of people of all sorts: from artists and diplomats to defectors, spies and penitent traitors, from Spanish confessors, Italian counsellors, Burgundian functionaries, English musicians, German bodyguards to the Belgian Nobles. Brussels became a link in the chain of Habsburg Courts and the diplomatic conduits between Madrid, Vienna, Paris, London, Lisbon, Graz, Innsbruck, Prague, and The Hague could be said to run through there.

The accession of James VI of Scotland as James I in England had paved the way for a separate peace with England. On 24 July 1604, England, Spain and the Archducal Netherlands signed the Treaty of London. The return to peace was severely hampered by differences over religion. Events such as the Gunpowder Plot caused a lot of diplomatic tension between London and Brussels, but the relations between the two courts tended to be cordial on the whole. Anne of Denmark wore Isabella's portrait in a locket as a public token of friendship and kinship.

The threat of diplomatic isolation and General Ambrogio Spínola's campaigns induced the Dutch Republic to accept a ceasefire in April 1609. The subsequent negotiations between the warring parties failed to produce a peace treaty, but led to the Twelve Years' Truce, agreed in Antwerp on 9 April 1609. Under the Truce's terms, the United Provinces were to be regarded as a sovereign power for the duration of the truce. After four decades of war, the treaty brought a period of much-needed peace to the Southern Netherlands.

=== Economy ===
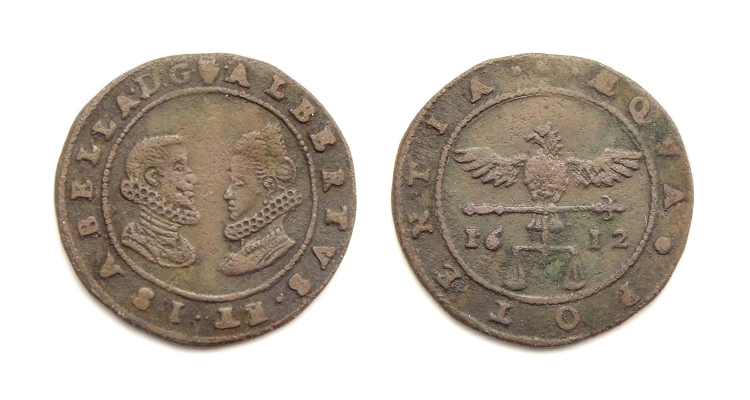
Jeton with portraits of Archdukes Albert and Isabella, struck in Antwerp in 1612.

The period of the Truce brought the Habsburg Netherlands a much-needed peace, mainly because the fields could be again worked in safety. The archducal regime encouraged reclamation of land that had been inundated in the course of the hostilities and sponsored the impoldering of De Moeren, a marshy area that is presently astride the Belgian–French border.

The recovery of agriculture led in turn to a modest increase of the population (and thus workers) after decades of demographic losses. Industry and in particular the luxury trades likewise underwent a recovery, bringing considerable economic stability and prosperity to the Southern Netherlands.

However, international trade was hampered by the closure of the River Scheldt. The archducal regime had plans to bypass the blockade with a system of canals linking Ostend via Bruges to the Scheldt in Ghent and joining the Meuse to the Rhine between Venlo and Rheinberg. To combat urban poverty, the government supported the creation of a network of Monti di Pietà based on the Italian model.

=== Religion ===
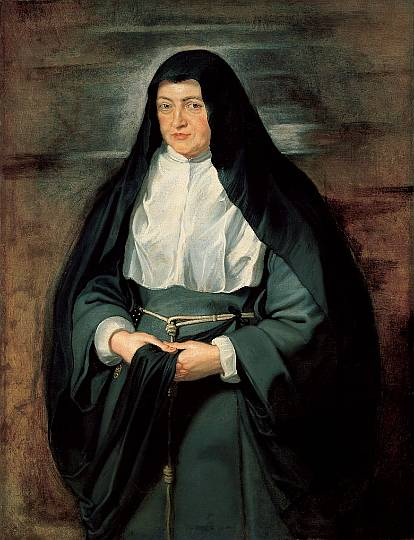
Portrait of Isabella Clara Eugenia As a Nun by Rubens, 1625

The archducal regime ensured the triumph of the Catholic Reformation in the Habsburg Netherlands. Most Protestants had by that stage left the Southern Netherlands. After one last execution in 1597, those that remained were no longer actively persecuted.

Under the terms of legislation passed in 1609, their presence was tolerated, provided they did not worship in public or engage in religious activities. The resolutions of the Third Provincial Council of Mechlin of 1607 were likewise given official sanction.

Through such measures and by the appointment of a generation of committed bishops, Albert and Isabella laid the foundation of the Catholic confessionalisation of the population. New and reformed religious orders enjoyed the particular support of the rulers. Although the Archduke had certain reservations about the order, the Jesuits received the largest cash grants, allowing them to complete their ambitious building programmes in Brussels and Antwerp. The Capuchins were given considerable sums as well. The foundation of the first convents of Discalced Carmelites in the Southern Netherlands depended wholly on the personal initiative of the archducal couple and bore witness to the Spanish orientation of their spirituality.

=== Legislative system ===
The reign of Albert and Isabella Clara Eugenia saw a strengthening of princely power in the Habsburg Netherlands. The States General of the loyal provinces were only summoned once in 1600. Thereafter, the government preferred to deal directly with the provinces.

The years of the Truce allowed the archducal regime to promulgate legislation on a whole range of matters. The so-called Eternal Edict of 1611, for instance, reformed the judicial system and ushered in the transition from customary to written law. Other measures dealt with monetary matters, the nobility, duels, gambling, etc.

=== Relationship with Spain ===
The actions of the two rulers stimulated the growth of a separate South Netherlandish identity. However, Albert and Isabella's marriage had no children, and as the years passed, it became clear that they would have no more offspring and thus independence wouldn't be possible.

After that, Albert and Isabella's goal became the reincorporation of the Southern Provinces into the Spanish monarchy. They consolidated the authority of the House of Habsburg over the territory of the Southern Netherlands and largely succeeded in reconciling previous anti-Spanish sentiments. As a result, the States of the loyal provinces swore to accept the Spanish king as heir of the Archduke and Archduchess in a number of ceremonies between May 1616 and January 1617.

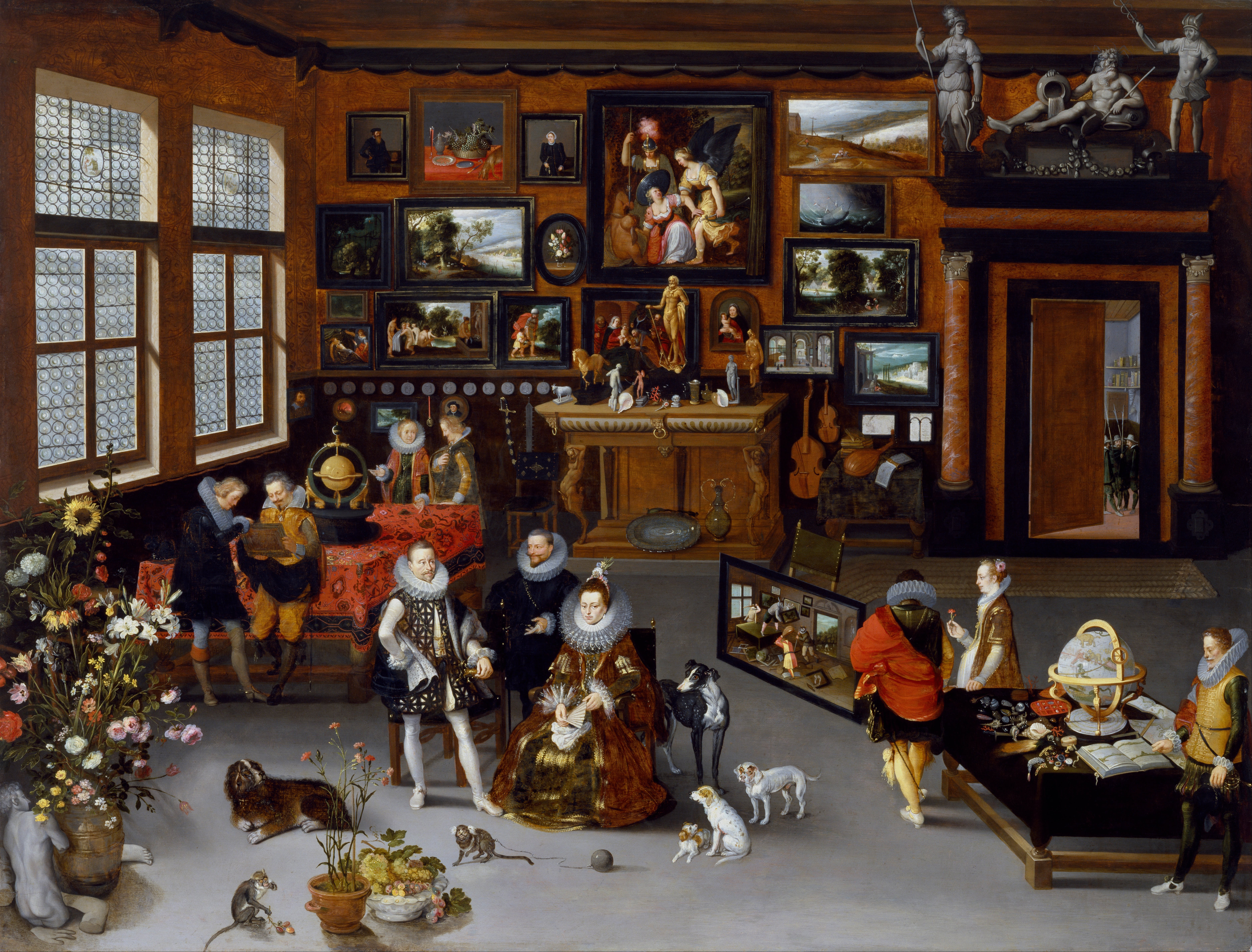
Albert and Isabella Visiting an Art Gallery by Jan Brueghel the Elder and Hieronymus Francken II.

=== Final years and death ===
After Albert's death in 1621, Isabella joined the Third Order of St Francis but continued to rule on behalf of her nephew, Philip IV. As Governess, Isabella alternated successes, such as that of the Capture of Breda in 1625, with failures and setbacks, such as the losses of Den Bosch in 1629 and Maastricht in 1632. She died in Brussels in 1633.

== Patronage of arts ==
=== Court of Brussels ===
Isabella and Albert were very supportive of the arts. In their patronage, they selected artists who were able create works that would promote the chief political goals of the Archdukes: to show that their reign was a continuation of the rule of the previous Burgundian and Habsburg rulers as well as to promote the ideals of the revitalized Catholic Church of which they were the staunch defenders. Their favorite artists created new iconography and genres that captured the devoutness and splendor of the archducal court. Their patronage of such artists and architects as Peter Paul Rubens (their court painter since 1609), Wenceslas Cobergher, Jan Brueghel the Elder, Jacob Franquart, Pieter Brueghel the Younger, the De Nole family, Otto van Veen, and stimulated the growth of the artistic movement of Flemish Baroque painting, sculpture and architecture.

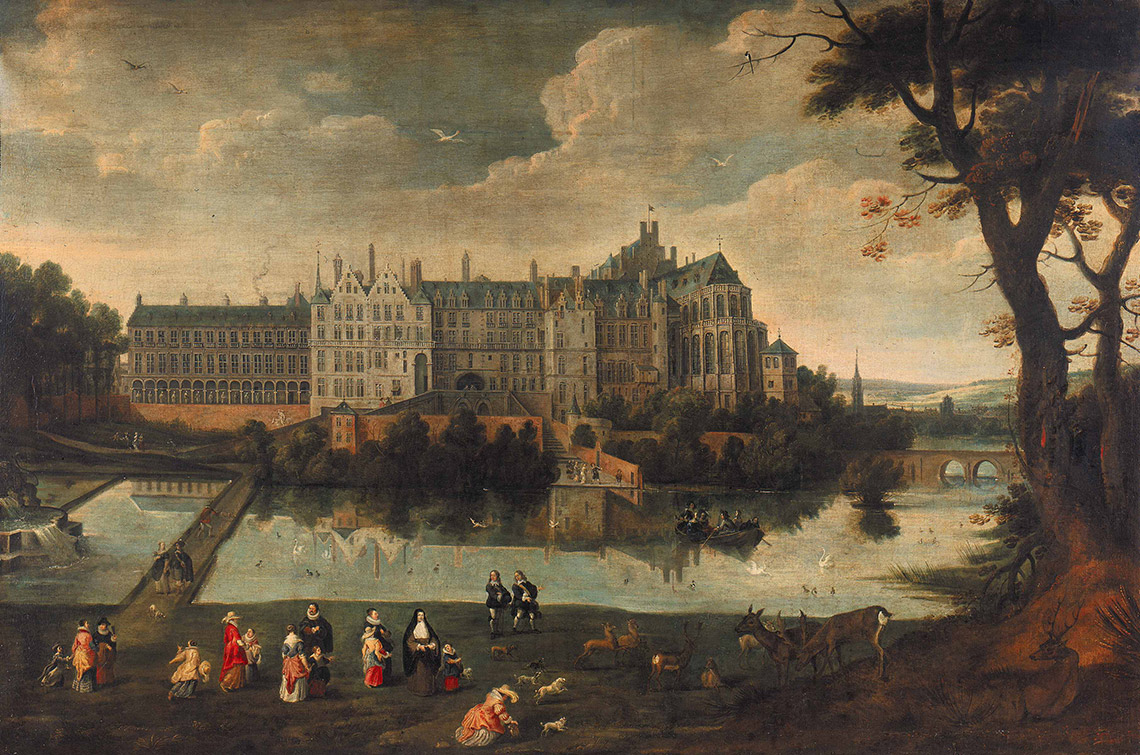
Infante Isabella in the Gardens of the Coudenberg Palace by Daniel van Heil and Jan Baptist van Heil

However, virtually nothing remains of Albert and Isabella's palace on the Coudenberg in Brussels, their summer retreat in Mariemont, or their hunting lodge in Tervuren. Their magnificent collections were scattered after 1633, and considerable parts of them have been lost. Still, the Archdukes enjoy a reputation as patrons of the arts. By far the best preserved ensemble of art from the archducal period is to be found at Scherpenheuvel, where Albert and Isabella directed Cobergher, Theodoor van Loon, and the de Noles to create a pilgrimage church in a planned city.

=== Descalzas reales ===
For a month in 1598 Isabella had lived in the Convent of Las Descalzas Reales in Madrid, alongside her mother-in-law Maria. She continued to take an active interest in the convent, and donated major artworks to it, including a famous series of Brussels tapestries, designed by Rubens. These depict Isabella as the order's patron saint, "Clare of Assisi with Monstrance".

=== The Triumph of The Eucharist ===
One of Isabella Clara Eugenia's most important acts of artistic patronage was commissioning Peter Paul Rubens to make the tapestry series The Triumph of the Eucharist, which was woven in Brussels between 1625 and 1633. The series is intended for the Descalzas Reales convent in Madrid, where she attended school. It honors the Catholic doctrine of the Eucharist and also claims Habsburg power during the Counter-Reformation. Through this commission, Isabella used art to spread Catholic devotion and support for her family's rule throughout Europe. Scholars contend that her partnership with Rubens redefined female political power in early modern art, as she associated herself with biblical archetypes of virtue and leadership, transforming her image from a passive consort into an active cultural strategist.

== In popular culture ==
- Isabella Clara Eugenia is a minor character in the alternate history 1632 series. She is most notable in the novel 1634: The Bavarian Crisis.
- In the 2002 alternate history novel Ruled Britannia by Harry Turtledove, where the Armada has been successful, Isabella Clara Eugenia is temporarily made Queen of England.
- In the 2007 film Elizabeth: The Golden Age, Isabella appeared in a minor role at the side of her father, Philip II of Spain, at the time of the attempted invasion of England by the Spanish Armada in 1588. The movie portrays Isabella as Philip's choice to replace Elizabeth on the throne of England. She was portrayed by actress Aimee King as a young girl rather than at the correct age of 19 years.

== Arms ==
Coat of arms as sovereign of Low Countries alongside Archduke Albert

Coat of arms as widow

== Ancestry ==
Ancestors of Isabella Clara Eugenia

8. Philip I of Castile
4. Charles V, Holy Roman Emperor
9. Joanna I of Castile
2. Philip II of Spain
10. Manuel I of Portugal
5. Isabella of Portugal
11. Maria of Aragon
1. Isabella Clara Eugenia, Sovereign of the Netherlands
12. Francis I of France
6. Henry II of France
13. Claude, Duchess of Brittany
3. Elisabeth of Valois
14. Lorenzo de' Medici, Duke of Urbino
7. Catherine de' Medici
15. Madeleine de la Tour d'Auvergne

== Sources ==
- Betegón Díez, Ruth (2004). Isabel Clara Eugenia: infanta de España y soberana de Flandes (in Spanish). Barcelona: Plaza & Janés.
- Klingenstein, L. (1910). The Great Infanta: Isabel, Sovereign of the Netherlands. Methuen & Co.
- Van Wyhe, Cordula, ed. (2011). Isabel Clara Eugenia: Female Sovereignty in the Courts of Madrid and Brussels. Madrid and London.
- Werner Thomas and Luc Duerloo (eds.), Albert & Isabella, 1598–1621: Essays (Turnhout, 1998).
- Marie de Villermont, L'Infante Isabelle, Gouvernante des Pays-Bas (Paris, 1912).
- Walsh, William Thomas (1937). Philip II. New York: Sheed & Ward. ISBN 978-0-89555-327-0.

Isabella Clara Eugenia House of Habsburg Born: 12 August 1566 Died: 1 December 1633
Regnal titles
Preceded by Philip II of Spain	Duchess of Brabant, Limburg, Lothier and Luxembourg; Margravine of Namur; Countess Palatine of Burgundy; Countess of Artois, Flanders, Charolais and Hainaut; 6 May 1598 – 13 July 1621 with Albert (6 May 1598 – 13 July 1621)	Succeeded by Philip IV of Spain
Government offices
Vacant Title last held by Archduke Albert of Austria	Governor of the Spanish Netherlands; 1621–1633	Succeeded by Cardinal-Infante Ferdinand
