= Palace of Valsain =

Former Spanish royal residence in Spain

Coordinates: 40.8771°N 4.0267°W

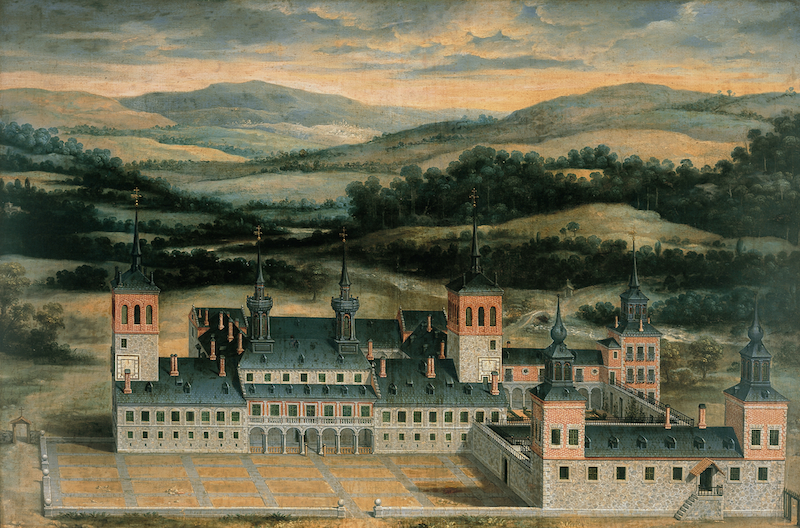
The palace of Valsain by Félix Castelo, 1710

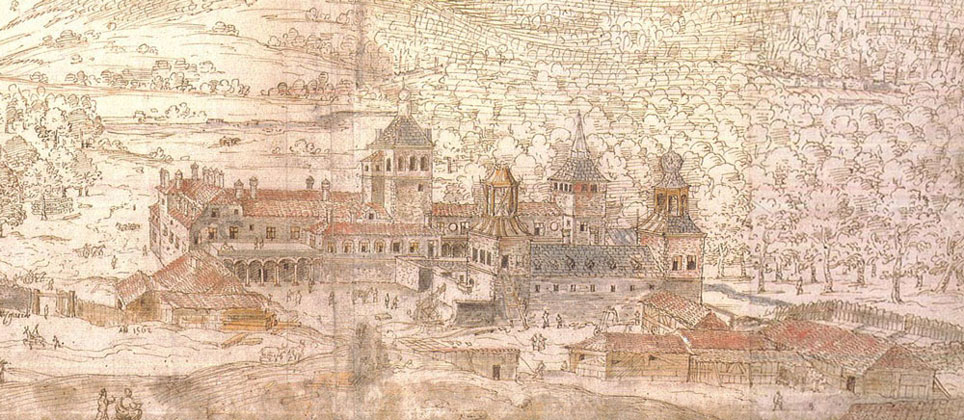
The palace of Valsain by Anton van der Wyngaerde

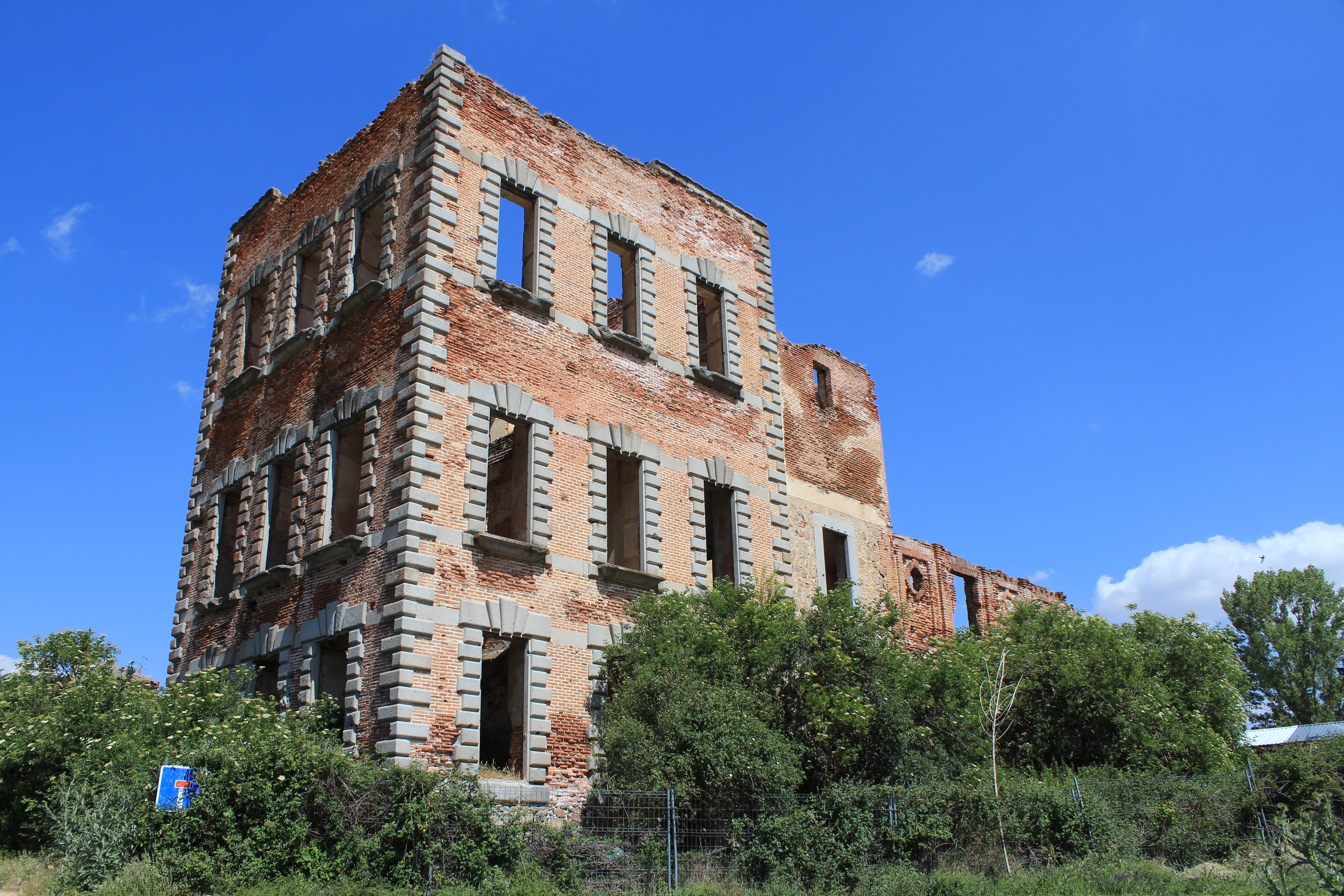
The palace of Valsain in 2014

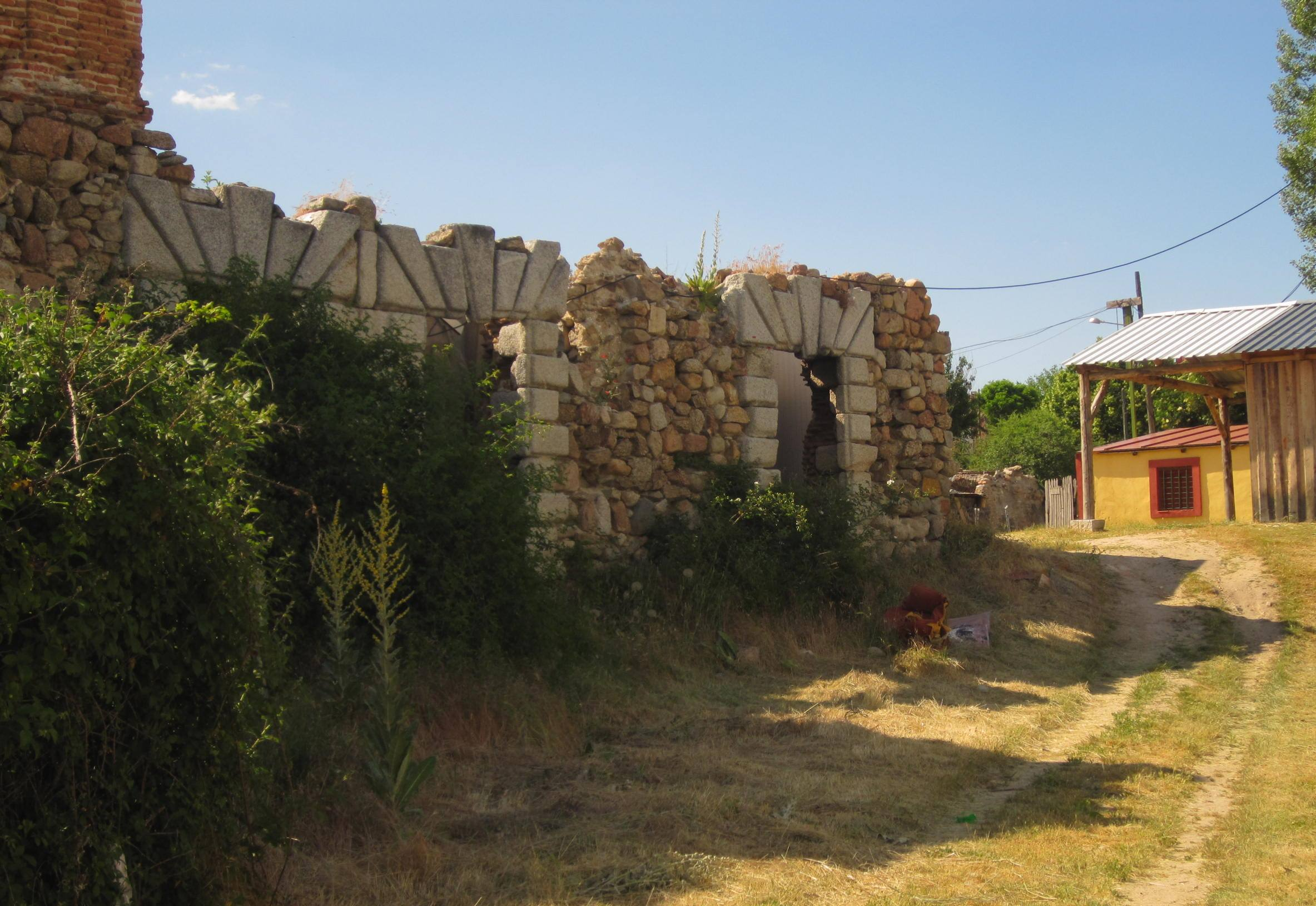
Detail of granite keystones in the ruins of the palace, 2013

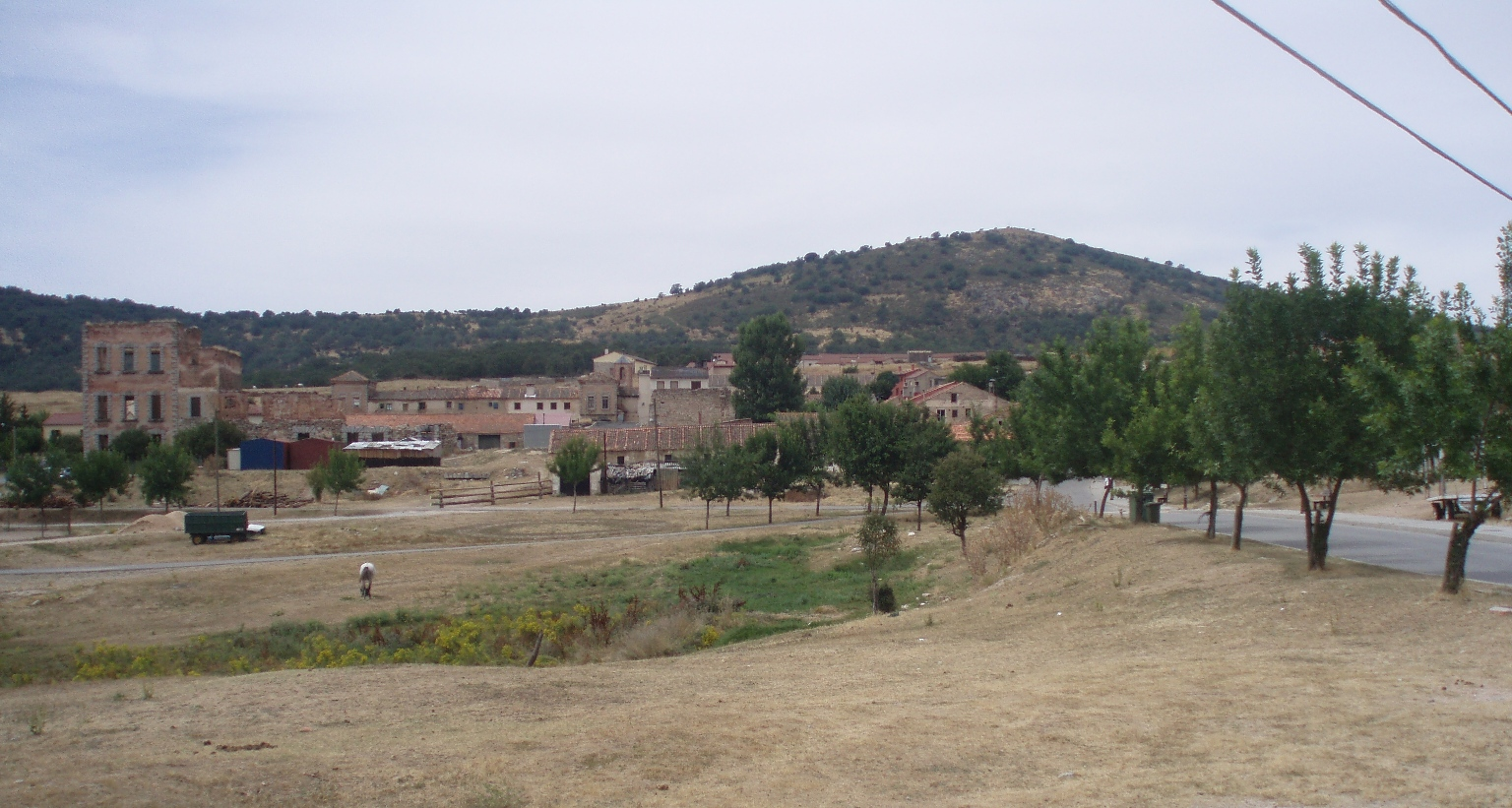
Valsain village with the ruins of the former palace

The Royal Palace of Valsain (Spanish: Palacio Real de Valsain) is a former Spanish royal residence, which is now in ruins. It is located in Valsain in the Province of Segovia, in the Castile and León Autonomous region of central Spain. It is approximately 14 kilometres (8.7 mi) from Segovia, and 75 kilometres (47 mi) north of Madrid.

== History ==
=== Construction ===
The Trastámara kings of Castile already had a hunting lodge in Valsain. But the royal palace itself was built between 1552 and 1556 for King Philip II by the architect Gaspar de Vega after the King returned from a trip to France, England, and the Netherlands. The architecture of the palace was heavily influenced by Netherlandish/Flemish architecture, such as Binche Palace, features of which were until then unknown in Spain: steeply pitched slate roofs, slated spires, dormer windows. These became characteristics of the Habsburg architecture in Spain.

=== Birthplace ===
The palace was the birthplace of princess Isabella Clara Eugenia, daughter of Philip II of Spain and his third wife Elisabeth of Valois, who later together with her husband Albert VII, Archduke of Austria became sovereign of the Spanish Netherlands in the Low Countries and the north of modern France.

=== Spanish match ===
The English Prince Charles came to Valsain in 1623, during the visit known as the "Spanish match". He admired the orchards and the situation of the building.

=== Fire ===
On 22 October 1682, the palace burnt down to a shell. Due to the political situation in Spain and the crisis around the succession, King Charles II was not able to restore the palace. His successor King Philip V built close by a new palace, the Royal Palace of La Granja de San Ildefonso. Today only the ruins remain.

== Bibliography ==
- Martínez Tercero, Enrique (1985) " “Valsaín: un Real Sitio flamenco en el Bosque de Segovia” Revista Reales Sitios nº 84", Madrid - http://www.devalsain.com/html/sitioflamenco.html
- Gárate Fernández-Cossío, Pablo (2012) "El Palacio de Valsaín - Una Reconstitución a través de sus vestigios - Tesis Doctoral" - http://oa.upm.es/19853/1/PABLO_GARATE_FERNANDEZ_COSSIO_1.pdf
- Gárate Fernández-Cossío, Pablo (2012) "La Torre Nueva del Palacio de Valsaín", Escuela Técnica Superior de Arquitectura de Madrid - http://www.castellarnau.org/files/plugin/contenidos/pdf/TorrePalacioValsain.pdf
- Prats y Rodríguez de Llano, Antonio (1925) "Bosquejo histórico del Palacio de Valsaín y de los jardines de San Ildefonso (La Granja – Segovia)", Madrid
