= Elena Gorokhova (writer) =

Russian writer (born 1955)

Elena Gorokhova is an author known for her memoirs about growing up in Russia.

== Biography ==
Gorokhova was born in 1955 in Leningrad. She studied English at Leningrad State University, now Saint Petersburg State University, before leaving the Soviet Union in 1980. She first moved to Texas, and in 1997 she moved to New Jersey.

In the United States, she received her doctorate in language teaching from Rutgers University. She teaches English as a second language at Hudson County Community College.

== Selected publications ==
- Gorokhova, Elena (2011). A Mountain of Crumbs: A Memoir. Simon & Schuster. ISBN 978-1-4391-2568-7.
- Gorokhova, Elena (2015). Russian Tattoo: A Memoir. Simon & Schuster.
- Gorokhova, Elena (2022). A Train to Moscow. Amazon. ISBN 9781542033862.
