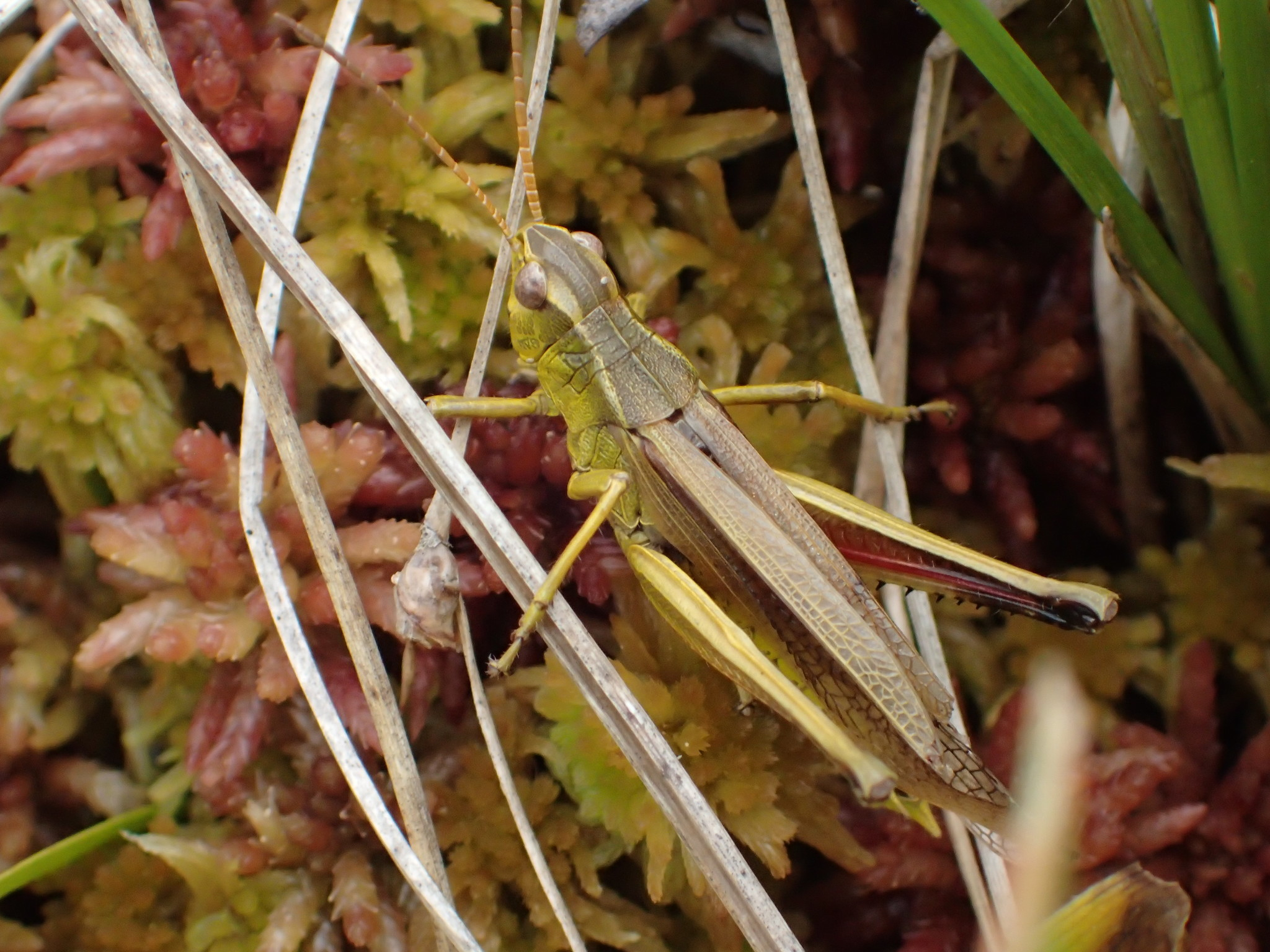
- Stethophyma gracile, graceful sedge grasshopper, Canada

Scientific classification
- Kingdom: Animalia
- Phylum: Arthropoda
- Clade: Pancrustacea
- Class: Insecta
- Order: Orthoptera
- Suborder: Caelifera
- Family: Acrididae
- Subfamily: Oedipodinae
- Tribe: Parapleurini
- Genus: Stethophyma
- Species: S. gracile

Binomial name
- Stethophyma gracile (Scudder & S.H., 1862)

= Stethophyma gracile =

Species of band-winged grasshopper

Stethophyma gracile, known generally as the Graceful Sedge Grasshopper or Northern Sedge Grasshopper, is a species of band-winged grasshopper in the family Acrididae. It is found in North America.
