= Ivan Gorokhov =

Russian painter

Ivan Lavrentievich Gorokhov
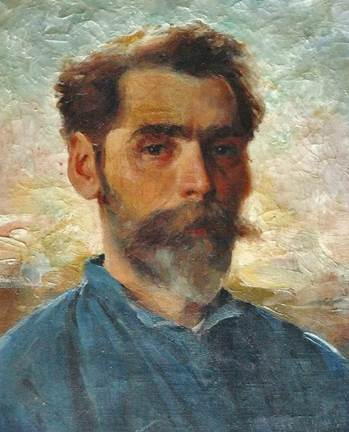
- Born: 23 January 1863; Beli, Moscow Governorate, Russian Empire
- Died: 6 October 1934 (aged 71)
- Education: Moscow School of Painting, Sculpture and Architecture
- Known for: Painting

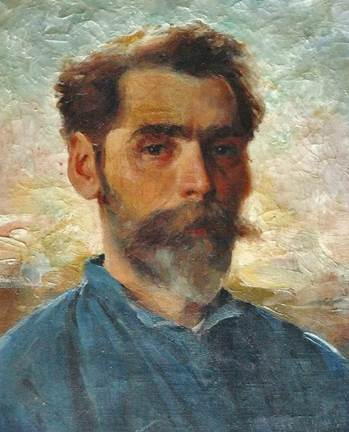
Self-portrait (c.1920)

Ivan Lavrentievich Gorokhov (Russian: Ива́н Лавре́нтьевич Горо́хов; 23 January 1863, Beli, Moscow Governorate - 6 October 1934, Mozhaysk) was a Russian genre and landscape painter; associated with the Peredvizhniki.

== Biography ==
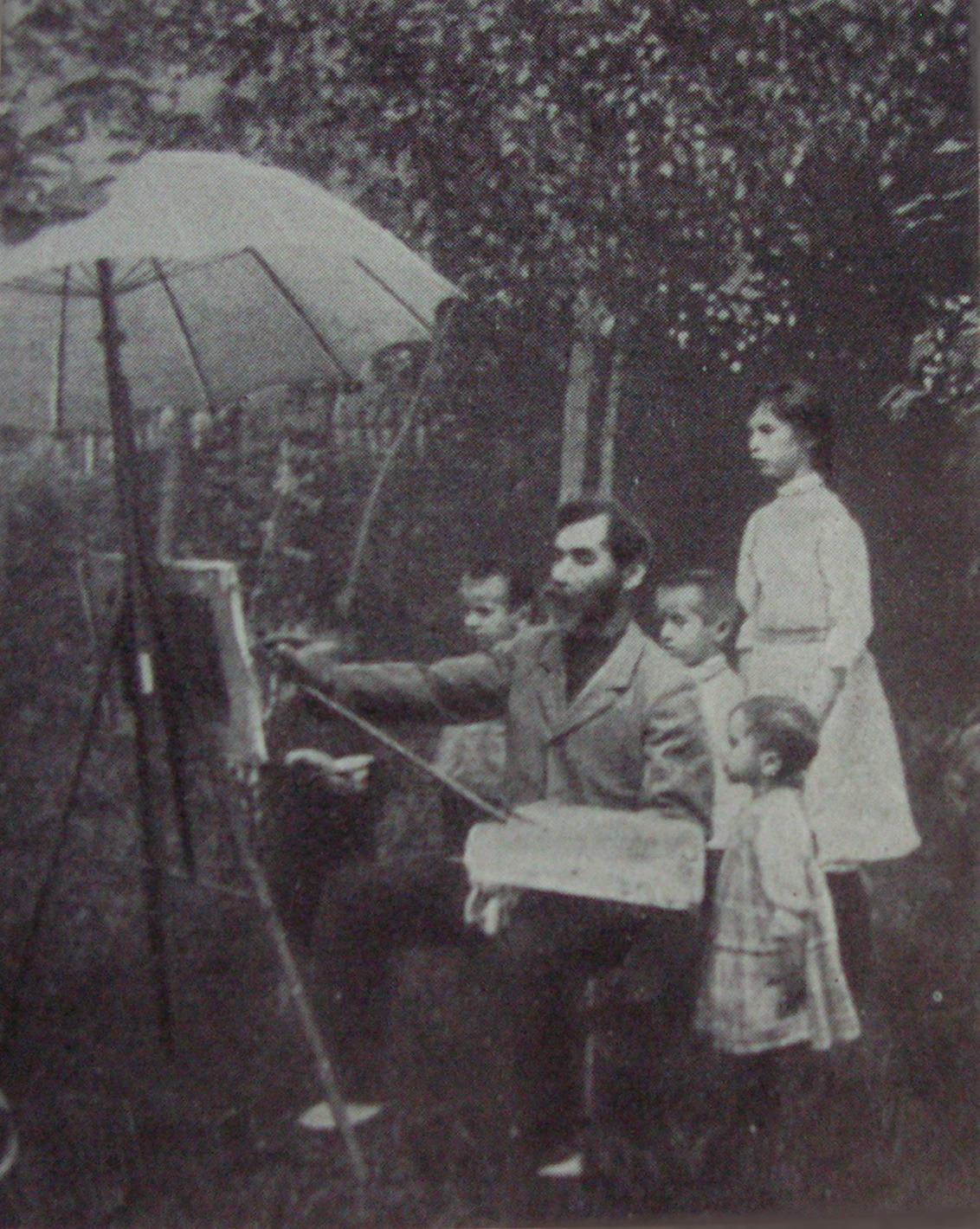
Gorokhov and his children in 1909

He was born to the family of a former serf. At an early age, he began to draw scenes from nature but was needed on the farm and was not allowed to pursue his interests. Word of his talent spread, however, and attracted the attention of a local landowner, Vladimir von Meck, son of the businessman, Karl von Meck. He showed some of Ivan's drawings to one of his guests, Nikolai Rubinstein, who joined with Von Meck to provide financial support so Ivan could attend the Moscow School of Painting, Sculpture and Architecture.

He began auditing classes there in 1874 and became a full student in 1880. His instructors included Illarion Pryanishnikov and Vladimir Makovsky. In 1886, he graduated with the title of "Artist" and a silver medal for his work "Recuperating". He considered continuing at the Imperial Academy of Arts but, on the advice of Konstantin Makovsky, chose to begin his career immediately.

However, despite the support of influential people, he was unable to get enough work to afford living in Moscow and returned to his native village, but found it just as hard to establish himself there. It was necessary to travel to Moscow to purchase art supplies or show his works, and this was often too expensive. This was eased somewhat when he became associated with the Peredvizhniki in 1893 and received positive reviews at their 21st exhibition. Some of his works were purchased by members of the Imperial family.

Following a fire in 1897, he moved to Mozhaysk, a market and trading center. From 1905 to 1930, he was a drawing teacher at the реальное училище (Realschule) there. After the October Revolution he turned to painting works of Socialist Realism, including portraits of Lenin and Lunacharsky and scenes from the Civil War. Only a handful of these later works survived, due to the general destruction experienced in the Mozhaysk area from 1941 to 1942, during the German invasion. Most of his paintings are in private collections.

== Artistic legacy ==
During his lifetime, Gorokhov created about 600 works - paintings, drawings, sketches. Ivan Gorokhov's paintings were bought by many famous collectors of the second half of the 19th century - early 20th century, including members of the Russian Imperial family: Empress Alexandra Fedorovna and Grand Duke Konstantin Romanov. Most of the picturesque works by Gorokhov are currently in the collections of private Russian collectors, as well as collectors from the CIS countries, Holland, Sweden, Egypt, the United States and others. Also, the paintings of Gorokhov are represented in the Tretyakov Gallery, the Russian Museum of St. Petersburg.

== Selected paintings ==
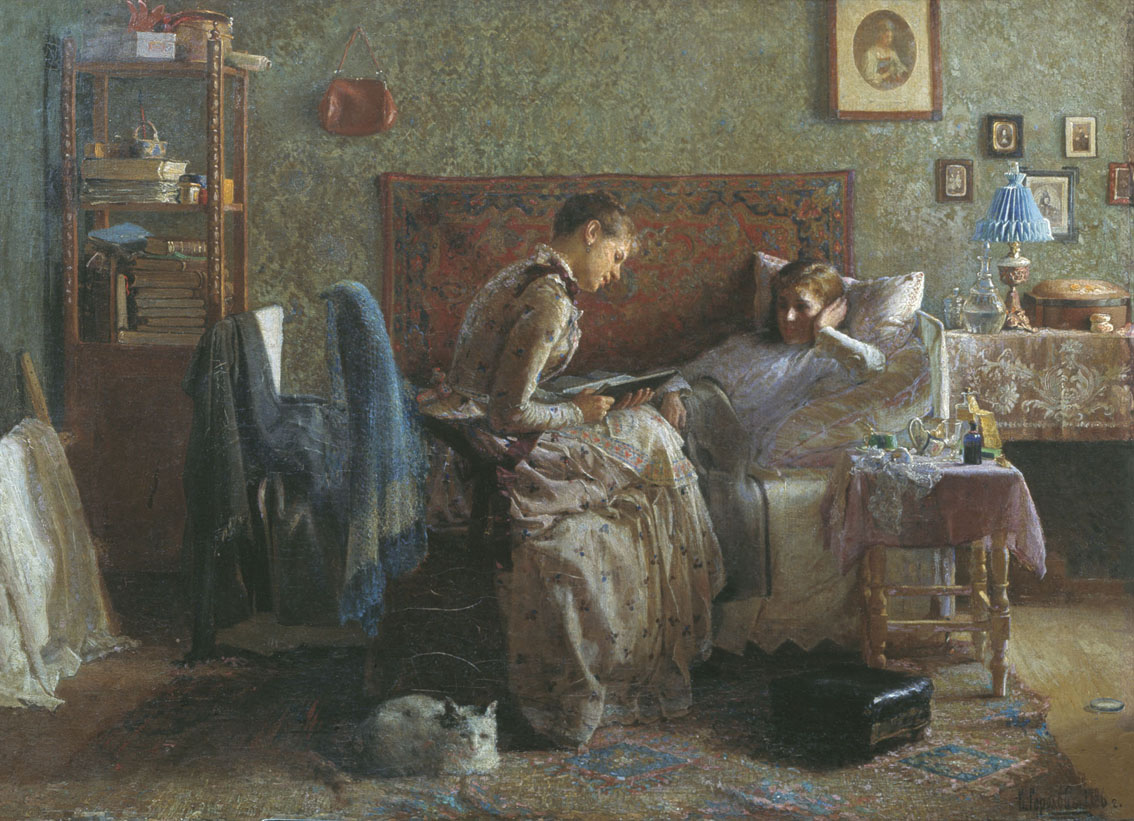
Recuperating

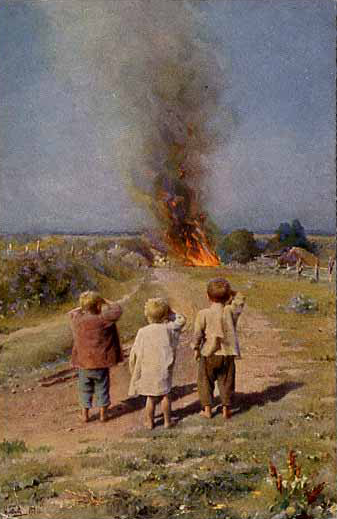
Watching a Fire

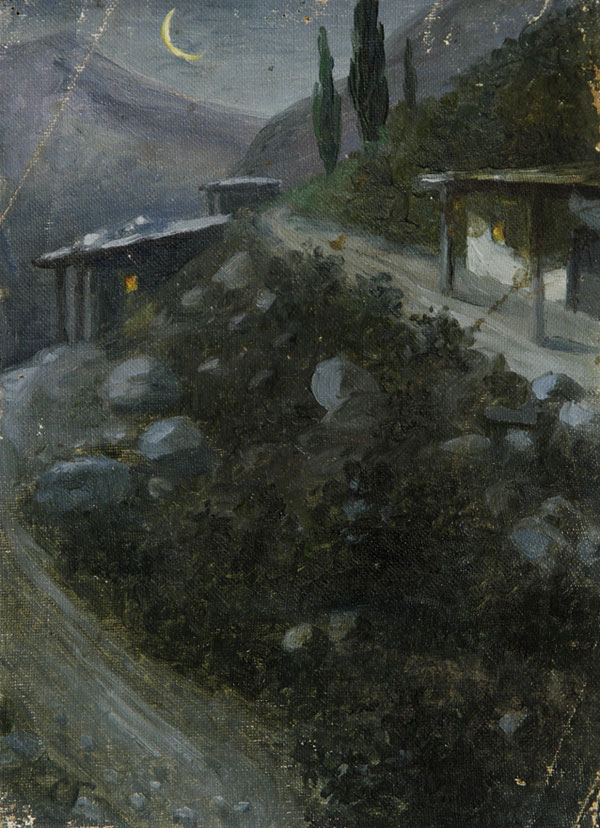
Night

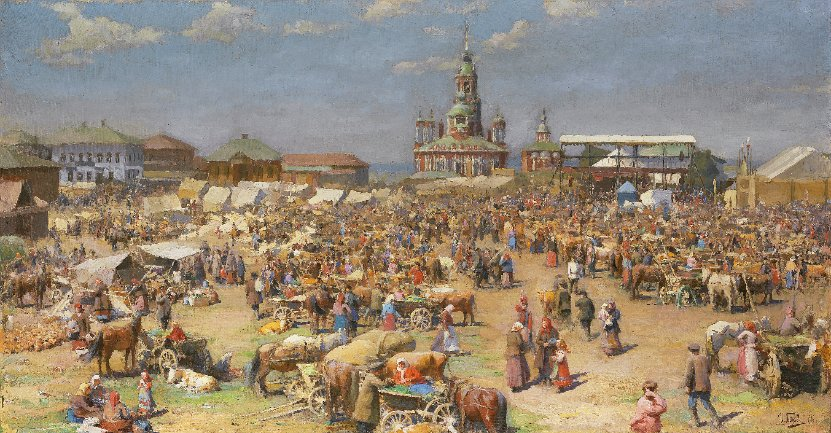
Fair in Mozhaysk
