= Entomological Review =

Peer-reviewed scientific journal

- Discipline: Entomology
- Language: English
- Edited by: Boris Alexandrovich Korotyaev

Publication details
- History: 1921-present
- Publisher: Pleiades Publishing in collaboration with Springer Science+Business Media
- Frequency: 9/year
- Open access: Hybrid

Standard abbreviations
- ISO 4: Entomol. Rev.

Indexing
- Entomological Review
- CODEN: ENREBV
- ISSN: 0013-8738 (print); 1555-6689 (web)
- LCCN: 61022632
- OCLC no.: 613003031
- Entomologicheskoe Obozrenie
- ISSN: 0026-8984 (print); 3034-5553 (web)

Links
- Journal homepage; Online archive; Journal page at Pleiades Publishing

Entomological Review (Russian: Энтомологическое обозрение, romanized: Entomologicheskoe Obozrenie) is a peer-reviewed scientific journal covering all aspects of entomology. The journal was established in 1921 and is published by Pleiades Publishing in collaboration with Springer Science+Business Media. The editor-in-chief is Boris Alexandrovich Korotyaev. The journal publishes research articles, brief communications, comments, editorials, and reviews.

== Abstracting and indexing ==
The journal is abstracted and indexed in AGRICOLA, Aquatic Sciences and Fisheries Abstracts, CAB Abstracts, and Scopus.
