= Orenburg State Pedagogical University =

State university in Orenburg, Russia

Orenburg State Pedagogical University (OSPU)
- Оренбургский государственный педагогический университет (ОГПУ)
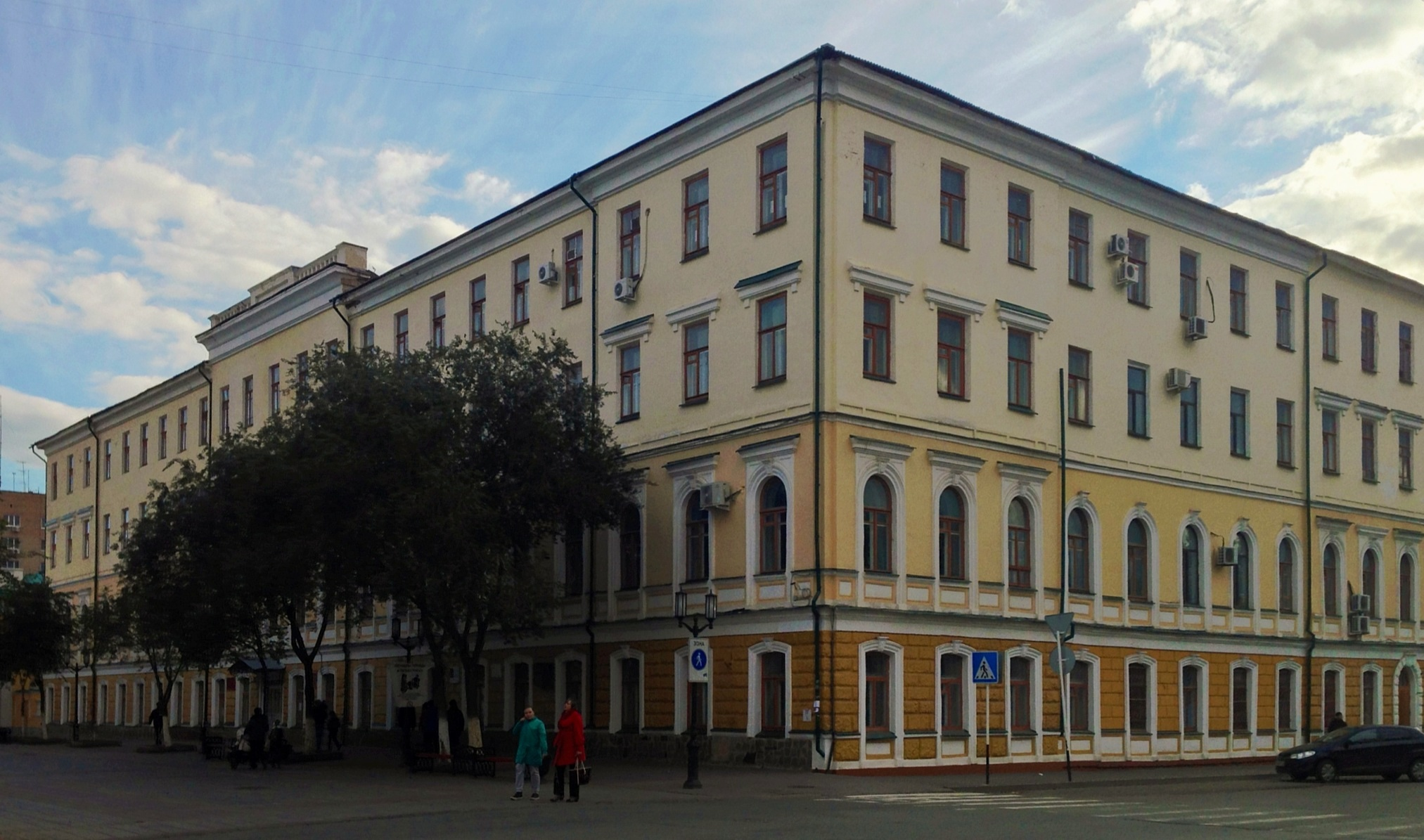
- Former names: Teacher's Institute; Orenburg Institute of Public Education; Orenburg State Pedagogical Institute named after V. P. Chkalov; Chkalov State Pedagogical Institute named after V. P. Chkalov
- Type: public
- Established: 1915
- Rector: Svetlana Aleksandrovna Aleshina
- Students: 5706
- Location: 19 Sovetskaya street, Orenburg, Orenburg Oblast, Russia; 51°45′35″N 55°06′09″E
- Campus: Urban
- Website: ospu.ru

Orenburg State Pedagogical University (OSPU; Russian: Оренбургский государственный педагогический университет; ОГПУ, Orenburgskiy gosudarstvennyy pedagogicheskiy universitet; OGPU) is a state university in Volga Federal District of Russia located in the city of Orenburg, the administrative centre of Orenburg Oblast.

== History ==
Orenburg State Pedagogical University is the oldest university in the Orenburg Oblast, as well as the second oldest higher educational institution in the region after the Orenburg Theological Seminary, founded in 1884.

The history of the university begins in 1915, when a Teacher's institute was opened in Orenburg. On 19 October 1919, the Orenburg Institute of Public Education was founded on the basis of this institute. By a resolution of the Commission of the Council of People's Commissars of the RSFSR dated 8 July 1930, it was renamed to the Orenburg State Pedagogical Institute.

In 1938–1957, the city of Orenburg was called Chkalov (in honor of the Soviet Air Force pilot Valery Chkalov), so the institute in those years was called Chkalov State Pedagogical Institute named after V. P. Chkalov.

By order of the Ministry of Education of the Russian Federation No. 516 dated 23 December 1996, the Orenburg State Pedagogical Institute named after V.P. Chkalov was renamed to the Orenburg State Pedagogical University.

As of 2022, the OSPU had graduated more than 48 thousand specialists.

== Educational and operational activities ==
The institute includes 7 faculties (Physical and mathematical; Historical; Philological; Foreign languages; Psychology; Pedagogy and methods of primary and preschool education; Social pedagogy), as well as two institutes (Institute of Natural Science and Economics; Institute of Physical Culture and Sports).

== Rectors ==
- from 2011 – Svetlana Alyoshina

== Sources ==
- Bolodurin V. S. (2000). История образования в Оренбуржье: Учебное пособие для студентов и слушателей образовательных учреждений (in Russian). Orenburg: OSPU Publishing house.
