= Igor Gorokhov =

Russian ice hockey player

- Born: November 28, 1990 (age 34); Novosibirsk, Soviet Union
- Height: 6 ft 0 in (183 cm)
- Weight: 174 lb (79 kg; 12 st 6 lb)
- Position: Defence
- Shot: Left
- Played for: Amur Khabarovsk
- Playing career: 2008–2017

Igor Gorokhov (Russian: Игорь Олегович Горохов; born November 28, 1990) is a Russian former professional ice hockey defenceman.

Gorokhov played 34 games for Amur Khabarovsk of the Kontinental Hockey League (KHL) during the 2009–10 KHL season.

== Career statistics ==
			Regular season					Playoffs
Season	Team	League	GP	G	A	Pts	PIM	GP	G	A	Pts	PIM
2005–06	Amur Khabarovsk-2	Russia3	22	0	1	1	4	—	—	—	—	—
2006–07	Amur Khabarovsk-2	Russia3	30	2	1	3	6	—	—	—	—	—
2007–08	Amur Khabarovsk-2	Russia3	50	0	7	7	16	—	—	—	—	—
2008–09	Yermak Angarsk	Russia2	41	0	3	3	8	—	—	—	—	—
2009–10	Amur Khabarovsk	KHL	34	0	2	2	4	—	—	—	—	—
2010–11	Amurskie Tigry Khabarovsk	MHL	51	1	15	16	16	8	1	5	6	2
2011–12	Amurskie Tigry Khabarovsk	MHL	60	3	28	31	18	8	0	4	4	4
2012–13	HC Kuban	VHL	12	0	3	3	2	—	—	—	—	—
2012–13	Kristall Saratov	VHL	19	1	2	3	6	—	—	—	—	—
2013–14	Kristall Saratov	VHL	19	1	1	2	6	—	—	—	—	—
2014–15	Yuzhny Ural Orsk	VHL	29	0	3	3	6	—	—	—	—	—
2015–16	Yuzhny Ural Orsk	VHL	10	0	1	1	4	—	—	—	—	—
2015–16	Sputnik Nizhny Tagil	VHL	5	0	0	0	0	2	0	0	0	0
2015–16	Yunior-Sputnik Nizhny Tagil	Russia3	2	0	0	0	0	—	—	—	—	—
2016–17	HK Sakhalin	Asia League	17	0	5	5	4	—	—	—	—	—
KHL totals			34	0	2	2	4	—	—	—	—	—
VHL totals			94	2	10	12	24	2	0	0	0	0
MHL totals			111	4	43	47	34	16	1	9	10	6
