= Andrey Gorokhov (politician) =

Russian politician (born 1960)

- Андрей Горохов

Deputy of the 8th State Duma
- Incumbent
- Assumed office 19 September 2021

Personal details
- Born: 13 January 1960 (age 66) Balkhash, Karaganda Region, Kazakh Soviet Socialist Republic, USSR
- Party: United Russia
- Education: Bauman Moscow State Technical University

Andrey Gorokhov (Russian: Андрей Юрьевич Горохов; born 13 January 1960) is a Russian political figure and a deputy of 8th State Duma.

In 1987, he was appointed the head of the department at the Ministry of General Machine Building. From 1990 to 2001, he was the CEO of the JSC Mashcenter. In 2001–2007, he was the Senior Lecturer at the Moscow Institute of Economics and Law. Since 2011, he has been first a docent and, later, a professor, at the Moscow State University of Technology and Management, named after K.G Razumovsky. In 2011 he was also elected as a deputy of the Kaliningrad Regional Duma of the 5th convocation. Since September 2021, he has served as a deputy of the 8th State Duma from the Kaliningrad Oblast constituency.

== Sanctions ==
He was sanctioned by the UK government in 2022 in relation to the Russo-Ukrainian War.

On 24 March 2022, the United States Treasury sanctioned him in response to the 2022 Russian invasion of Ukraine.
