= Orthopterists' Society =

The Orthopterists' Society (formerly the Pan American Acridological Society) is an international scientific organization devoted to facilitating communication and research among persons interested in Orthoptera and related organisms. (The Orthoptera include grasshoppers, locusts, crickets, katydids and other insects.) The Society currently has 330 members from 43 countries on six continents. The journal publishes papers on all aspects of the biology of these insects from ecology and taxonomy to physiology, endocrinology, cytogenetics, and control measures. The Society publishes the refereed biannual Journal of Orthoptera Research.

The Society was founded in 1976 by some 35 orthopterists who met at San Martín de los Andes, Argentina. Its Constitution and Bylaws were adopted in 1977, and it was accorded tax-exempt status by the United States government in 1978. The meetings held since San Martín have been at Bozeman (US), Maracay, (Venezuela), Saskatoon (Canada), Valsaín (Spain), Hilo (US), Cairns (Australia), Montpellier (France), and Canmore (Canada).

Graduate students and young researchers can apply for the Orthopterists' Society Research Fund.
