= Valsaín =

- Village
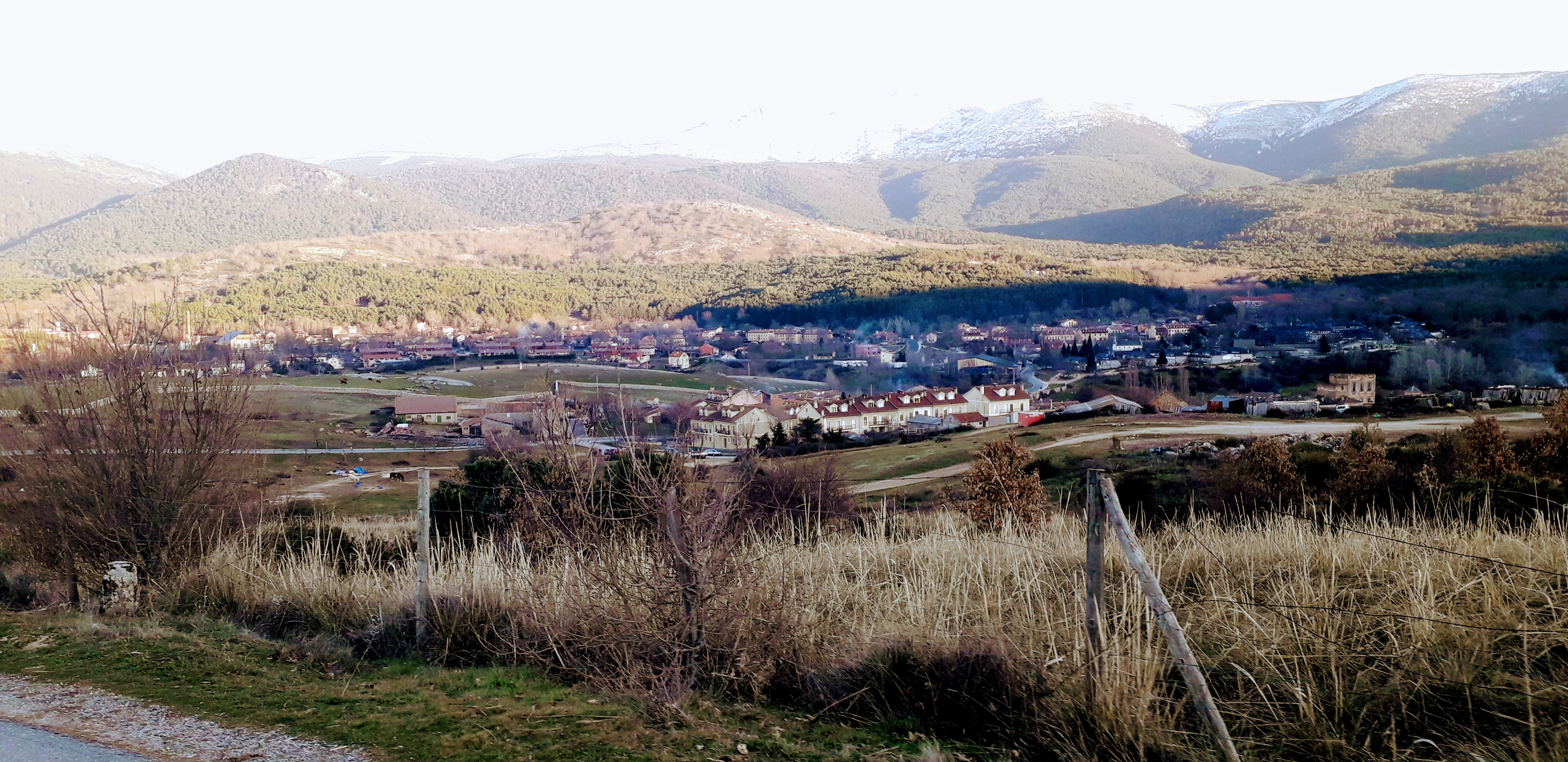

- Location in Spain.
- Coordinates: 40°52′42″N 4°01′39″W
- Country: Spain
- Autonomous community: Castile and León
- Province: Segovia
- Municipality: Real Sitio de San Ildefonso
- Elevation: 1,200 m (3,900 ft)

Population (2016)
  - Total: 176
- Time zone: UTC+1 (CET)
  - Summer (DST): UTC+2 (CEST)

Valsaín is a hamlet of Real Sitio de San Ildefonso, which is a town and municipality located within the Province of Segovia in Castile and León. It is located in the foothills of the Sierra de Guadarrama mountains, 14 kilometres (8.7 mi) from Segovia, and 75 kilometres (47 mi) north of Madrid. The village had a population of 176 inhabitants in 2016 (source: INE, the Spanish Statistical Office).

== Monuments ==
The ruins of the royal Palace of Valsain, a favorite summer palace of the Habsburg kings of Spain before they built the close by "La Granja" (Royal Palace of La Granja de San Ildefonso).
