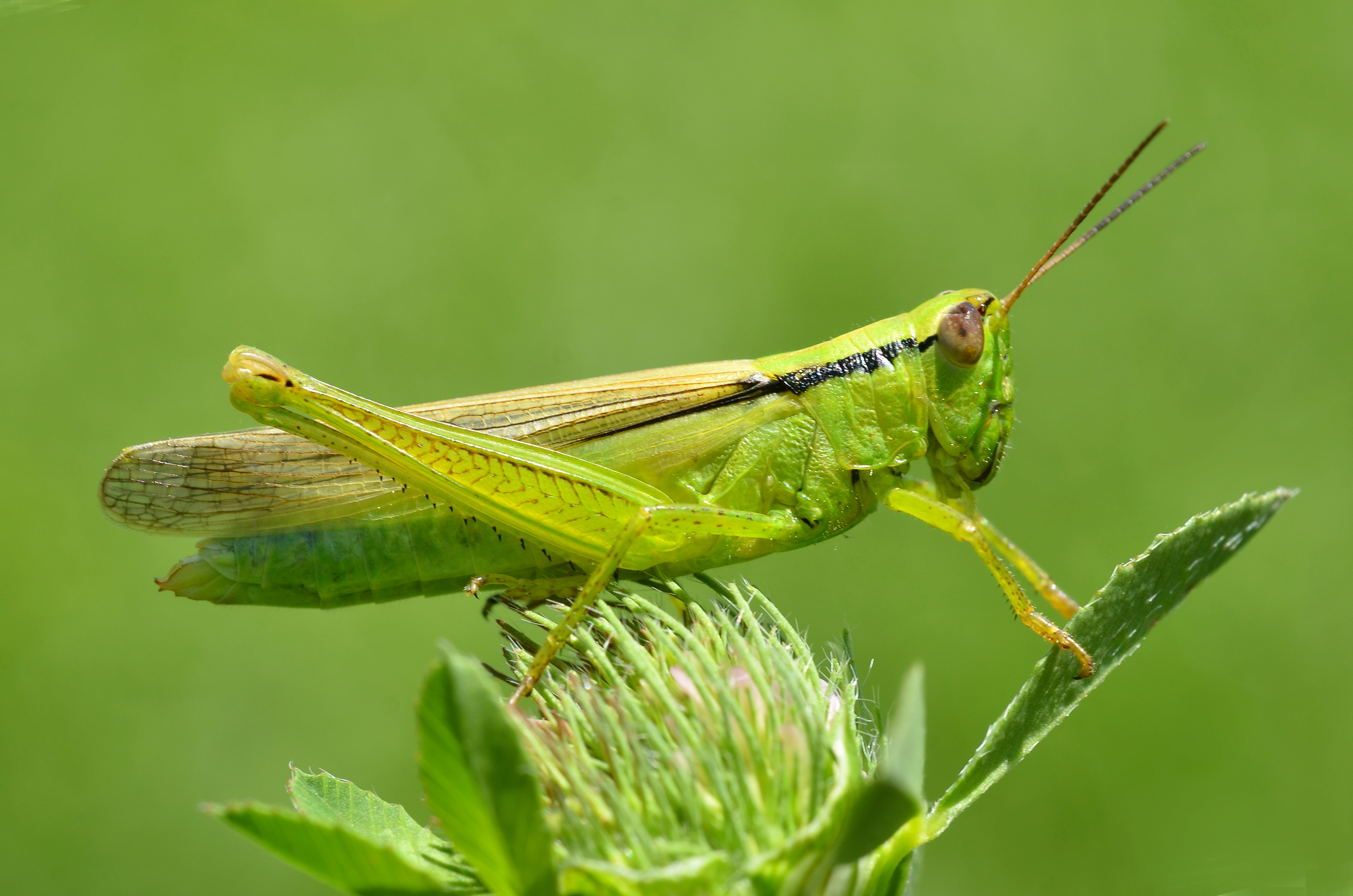
- Mecostethus parapleurus

Scientific classification
- Kingdom: Animalia
- Phylum: Arthropoda
- Class: Insecta
- Order: Orthoptera
- Suborder: Caelifera
- Family: Acrididae
- Subfamily: Oedipodinae
- Tribe: Parapleurini
- Genus: Mecostethus; Fieber, 1852

Synonyms
- Mesostethus Fieber, 1852; Parapleurus Fischer, 1853

= Mecostethus =

Genus of grasshoppers

Mecostethus is a genus of grasshoppers belonging to the family Acrididae. The species of this genus are found in Europe, Central Russia and Japan.

== Species ==
The following species are recognised in the genus Mecostethus:

- Mecostethus baichengensis Ren, Bingzhong, X.Sun & Haitao Wang, 2002
- Mecostethus parapleurus (Hagenbach, 1822)
- Mecostethus rufifemoralis Z.Zheng & F.-M.Shi, 2009
