= Itarinae =

Scientific classification
- Domain: Eukaryota
- Kingdom: Animalia
- Phylum: Arthropoda
- Class: Insecta
- Order: Orthoptera
- Suborder: Ensifera
- Infraorder: Gryllidea
- Superfamily: Grylloidea
- Family: Gryllidae
- Subfamily: Itarinae; Shiraki, 1930

Synonyms
- Phormincterites Saussure, 1878; Itarini Shiraki, 1930

Subfamily of crickets

External image
- Images at iNaturalist

The Itarinae are a subfamily of crickets, in the family Gryllidae (subfamily group Gryllinae), based on the type genus Itara. They are terrestrial and omnivorous and distributed in tropical and subtropical Asia.

== Genera ==
The Orthoptera Species File lists just two genera:

- Itara Walker, 1869
- Parapentacentrus Shiraki, 1930
