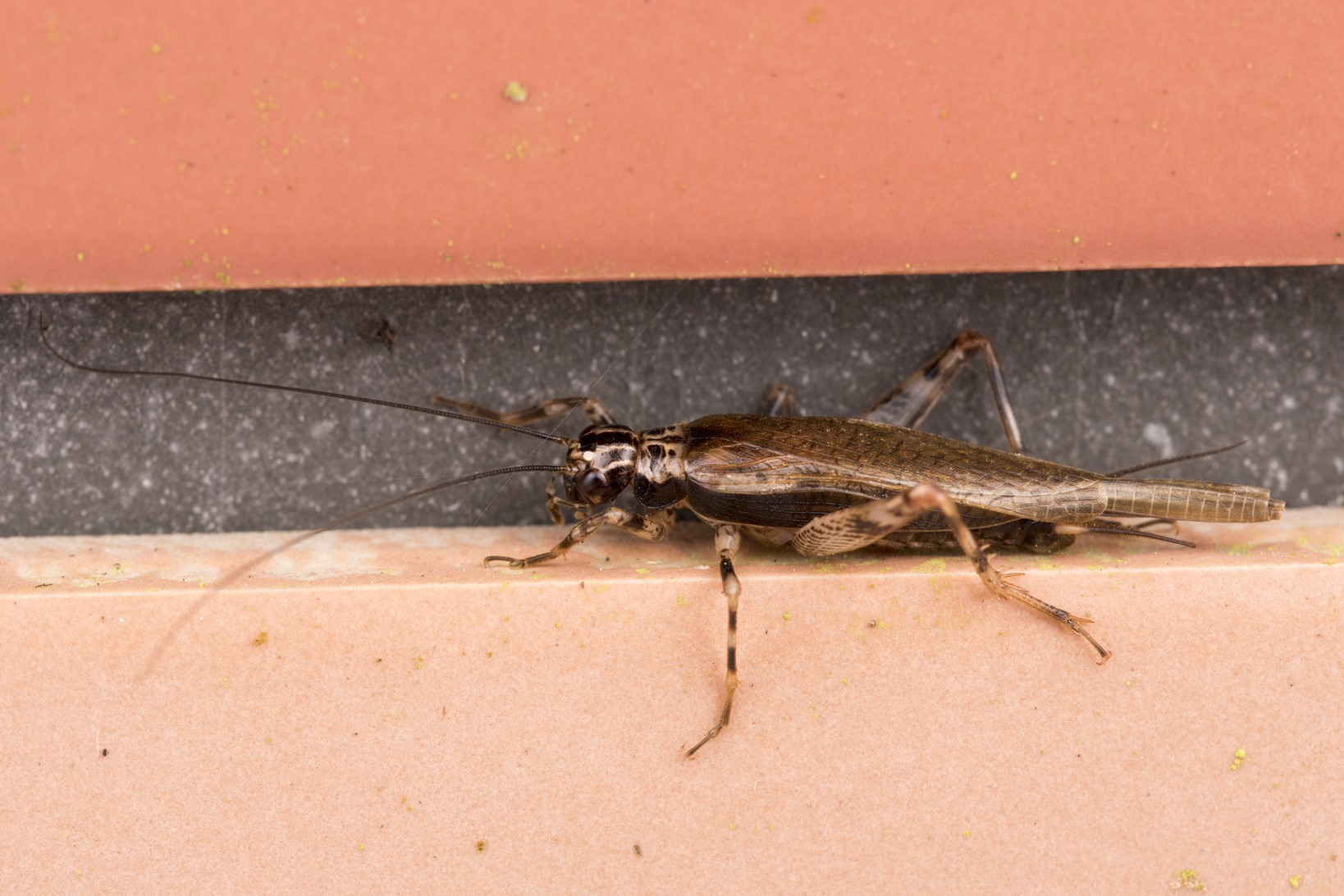
- Parapentacentrus formosanus

Scientific classification
- Domain: Eukaryota
- Kingdom: Animalia
- Phylum: Arthropoda
- Class: Insecta
- Order: Orthoptera
- Suborder: Ensifera
- Superfamily: Grylloidea
- Family: Gryllidae
- Subfamily: Itarinae
- Genus: Parapentacentrus; Shiraki, 1930

Synonyms
- Pseuditara Chopard, 1969

= Parapentacentrus =

Genus of crickets

Parapentacentrus is a genus of crickets, in the subfamily Itarinae. It has also been placed in the subfamily Pentacentrinae. Species can be found in Indo-China, south-east China and Taiwan.

== Species ==
The following species are recognised in the genus Parapentacentrus:

- Parapentacentrus brevipennis He, 2021
- Parapentacentrus formosanus Shiraki, 1930 - type species
- Parapentacentrus fuscus Gorochov, 1988

== See also ==
- Data related to Homalogryllini at Wikispecies
