= Parendacustes =

Scientific classification
- Domain: Eukaryota
- Kingdom: Animalia
- Phylum: Arthropoda
- Class: Insecta
- Order: Orthoptera
- Suborder: Ensifera
- Family: Phalangopsidae
- Tribe: Phalangopsini
- Genus: Parendacustes; Chopard, 1924

Genus of crickets

Parendacustes is a genus of crickets (Orthoptera: Ensifera) in the family Phalangopsidae, tribe Phalangopsini, subtribe Parendacustina. Species have been recorded from Indo-China (although no Vietnam records to date), Malesia and New Guinea.

== Species ==
The Orthoptera Species File lists:

subgenus Minizacla Gorochov, 2003

- Parendacustes brevispina Gorochov, 2017
- Parendacustes buton Gorochov, 2017
- Parendacustes chopardi Gorochov, 2003
- Parendacustes derelicta Gorochov, 2006
- Parendacustes doloduo Gorochov, 2017
- Parendacustes forficula Chopard, 1930
- Parendacustes glandulosus Gorochov, 1996
- Parendacustes kendari Gorochov, 2017
- Parendacustes lindu Gorochov, 2017
- Parendacustes longispina Gorochov, 2017
- Parendacustes makassari Gorochov, 2006
- Parendacustes minutus Chopard, 1954
- Parendacustes modispina Gorochov, 2017
- Parendacustes mulu Gorochov, 2017
- Parendacustes nitens Gorochov, 2005
- Parendacustes pallescens Gorochov, 2017
- Parendacustes papua Gorochov, 2018
- Parendacustes sulawesi Gorochov, 2003
- Parendacustes supiori Gorochov, 2006
- Parendacustes trusmadi Gorochov, 2017
- Parendacustes wasile Gorochov, 2018

subgenus Parendacustes Chopard, 1924

- Parendacustes arachne Gorochov, 2017
- Parendacustes berezini Gorochov, 2017
- Parendacustes cavicola Chopard, 1924 - type species
- Parendacustes dohmi Gorochov, 2003
- Parendacustes ectoparameralis Gorochov, 2017
- Parendacustes handschini Chopard, 1937
- Parendacustes javanus Chopard, 1925
- Parendacustes kerinci Gorochov, 2003
- Parendacustes khaosoki Gorochov, 2003
- Parendacustes latifrons Chopard, 1969
- Parendacustes magnispeculum Gorochov, 2017
- Parendacustes pahangi Gorochov, 2003
- Parendacustes pendleburyi Chopard, 1969
- Parendacustes pictus Chopard, 1925
- Parendacustes sanyali Bhowmik, 1970
- Parendacustes sylvestris Gorochov, 2017
- Parendacustes tawau Gorochov, 2017
- Parendacustes testaceus Chopard, 1930
- Parendacustes tioman Gorochov, 2017
- Parendacustes tkatshevae Gorochov, 2017
- Parendacustes umbra Gorochov, 2005
