= Itara =

Scientific classification
- Kingdom: Animalia
- Phylum: Arthropoda
- Class: Insecta
- Order: Orthoptera
- Suborder: Ensifera
- Superfamily: Grylloidea
- Family: Gryllidae
- Subfamily: Itarinae
- Genus: Itara; Walker, 1869

Genus of crickets

External image
- Images at iNaturalist

Itara is an Asian genus of crickets, and typical of the subfamily Itarinae. Species can be found in India, southern China, Indo-China and West Malesia (including Borneo).

== Description ==
The original paper states that the females have: "Body fusiform, tomentose. Head and prothorax small. Head shining, short, rounded in front, as broad as the fore border of the prothorax. Eyes moderately large, near the hind border, slightly elongated, not prominent. Third joint of the maxillary palpi clavate, shorter than the second. Antennas slender. Prothorax narrower in front, much broader than long; lateral keels well defined; sides slightly rounded. Cerci full as long as the abdomen. Anterior legs rather short and stout. Hind wings moderately long; tibiae with three spurs on each side; tarsi with the usual structure. Fore wings somewhat broad, extending rather beyond the abdomen; transverse sectors beyond the tympanum numerous and regular. Hind wings extending somewhat beyond the fore wings."

== Species ==
The Orthoptera Species File lists a large number of species, grouped into ten subgenera:

- Itara (Bornitara) Gorochov, 1997
  - Itara borneoensis Gorochov, 1997
  - Itara chopardi Gorochov, 1997
  - Itara copiosa Gorochov, 2007
  - Itara kalimantanensis Gorochov, 1997
  - Itara latipennis Chopard, 1930
  - Itara sabahensis Gorochov, 1997
  - Itara sarawakensis Gorochov, 1997
  - Itara trusmadi Gorochov, 2007
- Itara (Gryllitara) Chopard, 1931
  - Itara ampla Gorochov, 2001
  - Itara curupi Gorochov, 2009
  - Itara denudate Ma & Zhang, 2015
  - Itara diligens Gorochov, 1997
  - Itara pendleburyi (Chopard, 1931)
- Itara (Inditara) Gorochov, 2009
  - Itara indiae Gorochov, 2009
- Itara (Itara) Walker, 1869
  - Itara abdita Gorochov, 1996
  - Itara aperta Gorochov, 1996
  - Itara basidentata Ma & Zhang, 2015
  - Itara communis Gorochov, 1997
  - Itara dicrana Ma & Zhang, 2015
  - Itara distincta Gorochov, 1997
  - Itara kirejtshuki Gorochov, 1997
  - Itara korotyaevi Gorochov, 1997
  - Itara minor Chopard, 1925
  - Itara mjobergi Chopard, 1930
  - Itara palawanensis Gorochov, 2004
  - Itara sericea Walker, 1869 - type species
  - Itara tioman Gorochov, 2013
  - Itara vietnamensis Gorochov, 1985
- Itara (Maxitara) Gorochov, 2001
  - Itara kinabalu Gorochov, 2013
  - Itara latiapex Gorochov, 2007
  - Itara maxima Gorochov, 2001
  - Itara megacephala Gorochov, 2007
  - Itara parallela Gorochov, 2007
- Itara (Micritara) Gorochov, 1997
  - Itara denticulata Chopard, 1940
  - Itara minuta Chopard, 1940
- Itara (Noctitara) Gorochov, 1997
  - Itara nocturna Gorochov, 1988
  - Itara pacholatkoi Gorochov, 1997
  - Itara sonabilis Gorochov, 1996
  - Itara thailandensis Gorochov, 1997
- Itara (Phormincter) Saussure, 1878
  - Itara finitima Gorochov, 2007
  - Itara ivanovi Gorochov, 2008
  - Itara johni Gorochov, 1997
  - Itara kerzhneri Gorochov, 1997
  - Itara major Chopard, 1930
  - Itara melanocephala Gorochov, 1988
  - Itara microcephala (Haan, 1842)
  - Itara mira Gorochov, 2007
  - Itara popovi Gorochov, 1997
  - Itara proxima Gorochov, 1997
  - Itara raggei Gorochov, 1997
  - Itara similis Gorochov, 1988
  - Itara uvarovi Gorochov, 1997
- Itara (Singitara) Gorochov, 1997
  - Itara nigra Gorochov, 1997
  - Itara singularis Gorochov, 1997
- Itara (Tinnitara) Gorochov, 2007
  - Itara sympatrica Gorochov, 2007
  - Itara tinnula Gorochov, 2007
