= Laozacla =

Scientific classification
- Domain: Eukaryota
- Kingdom: Animalia
- Phylum: Arthropoda
- Class: Insecta
- Order: Orthoptera
- Suborder: Ensifera
- Family: Phalangopsidae
- Subfamily: Phalangopsinae
- Tribe: Phalangopsini
- Genus: Laozacla; Gorochov, 2014
- Species: L. furca

Binomial name
- Laozacla furca Gorochov, 2014

Genus of crickets

Laozacla is a genus of crickets (Orthoptera: Ensifera) in the family Phalangopsidae, subfamily Phalangopsinae, tribe Phalangopsini.

The single (type) species Laozacla furca Gorochov, 2014 is recorded from pitfall traps in Champasak Province, Laos, after which the genus is named.
