= Cooloola =

Cooloola may refer to:

Animals

- Cooloola (insect), a genus of the insect family Cooloolidae
  - Cooloola monster (Cooloola propator), a species of the genus
- Cooloola sedge frog (Litoria cooloolensis)

Places

- Cooloola Great Walk, 102 km coastal bushwalking route
- Cooloola, Queensland, a locality in the Gympie Region, Queensland, Australia
- Shire of Cooloola, Queensland, Australia (now part of Gympie Region)

Other

- Cooloola Christian College, Gympie, Queensland
- Tillandsia 'Cooloola', a plant cultivar
