= Comicus =

Scientific classification
- Domain: Eukaryota
- Kingdom: Animalia
- Phylum: Arthropoda
- Class: Insecta
- Order: Orthoptera
- Suborder: Ensifera
- Family: Schizodactylidae
- Genus: Comicus; Brunner von Wattenwyl, 1888

Genus of insects

Comicus is a genus of southern African Orthopteran insects of the family Schizodactylidae, erected by Brunner von Wattenwyl in 1888.

== Species ==
The Orthoptera Species File lists:

1. Comicus arenarius Ramme, 1931
2. Comicus cabonegrus Irish, 1986
3. Comicus calaharicus Irish, 1986
4. Comicus calcaris Irish, 1986
5. Comicus campestris Irish, 1986
6. Comicus capensis Brunner von Wattenwyl, 1888 - type species
7. Comicus carnalli Irish, 1995
8. Comicus cavillorus Irish, 1986
9. Comicus myburghi Gorochov, 2021
10. Comicus namibicus Gorochov, 2021
11. Comicus orangensis Gorochov, 2021
