= Schizodactylus hesperus =

Scientific classification
- Domain: Eukaryota
- Kingdom: Animalia
- Phylum: Arthropoda
- Class: Insecta
- Order: Orthoptera
- Suborder: Ensifera
- Family: Schizodactylidae
- Genus: Schizodactylus
- Species: S. hesperus

Binomial name
- Schizodactylus hesperus Bey-Bienko, 1967

Species of cricket-like animal

Schizodactylus hesperus is a species of cricket in the Schizodactylidae family, originally described in 1967 by Bey-Bienko.
