= Schizodactylus inexspectatus =

Scientific classification
- Kingdom: Animalia
- Phylum: Arthropoda
- Class: Insecta
- Order: Orthoptera
- Suborder: Ensifera
- Family: Schizodactylidae
- Genus: Schizodactylus
- Species: S. inexspectatus

Binomial name
- Schizodactylus inexspectatus (F. Werner, 1901)

Synonyms
- Comicus inexspectatus Werner, 1901; Dactylocomicus inexpectatus Karny, 1937

Species of cricket-like animal

Schizodactylus inexspectatus (often misspelled "inexpectatus") is a species of dune cricket (Schizodactylidae) endemic to sand dunes of Çukurova and Göksu Deltas, Turkey.

== Taxonomic history ==
Schizodactylus inexspectatus was first described by Franz Werner in 1901 under the name Comicus inexspectatus. It was transferred to the genus Schizodactylus in 1931. The species was known from only a single individual and was not found again for almost a century, with the species generally thought to be extinct, but it was rediscovered in the Çukurova Delta after almost a century.

== Description and life history ==
Adults reach 41 millimetres (1.6 in) long, and are yellow in colour, with black patches on the pronotum that resemble a butterfly. The cephalon and thorax representing more of the length than the abdomen. The antennae are 80–90 mm (3.1–3.5 in) long. The adults have short wings, approximately 10 mm (0.39 in) long, but they are incapable of flight. There are nine nymphal stages before adulthood, the first of which has a body length of 7 mm (0.28 in).

== Ecology and distribution ==
Schizodactylus inexspectatus feeds on the mole cricket Gryllotalpa gryllotalpa, the beetles Scarabaeus sacer, Pentodon bidens, Scaurus puncticollis, Zophosis dilatata and Erodius orientalis, the German cockroach Blattella germanica and the ant-lion Myrmeleon. It lives in burrows in sand dune systems in eastern Turkey, especially in the Çukurova delta.
