= Protogryllidae =

Protogryllidae Temporal range: Rhaetian–Berriasian

Scientific classification
- Domain: Eukaryota
- Kingdom: Animalia
- Phylum: Arthropoda
- Class: Insecta
- Order: Orthoptera
- Suborder: Ensifera
- Infraorder: Gryllidea
- Superfamily: Grylloidea
- Family: †Protogryllidae; Zeuner, 1937

Extinct family of crickets

Protogryllidae is an extinct family of crickets in the order Orthoptera. There are about 8 genera and more than 20 described species in Protogryllidae.

== Genera ==
These eight genera belong to the family Protogryllidae:

- † Aenigmagryllus Gorochov, 1992
- † Angarogryllus Gorochov, 1985
- † Asiogryllus Gorochov, 1985
- † Bacharogryllus Gorochov, 1984
- † Falsispeculum Gorochov, 1985
- † Karataogryllus Sharov, 1968
- † Parangarogryllus Gorochov, 1984
- † Protogryllus Handlirsch, 1906
