= Anelcanidae =

Scientific classification
- Domain: Eukaryota
- Kingdom: Animalia
- Phylum: Arthropoda
- Class: Insecta
- Order: Orthoptera
- Suborder: Ensifera
- Infraorder: †Oedischiidea
- Superfamily: †Oedischioidea
- Family: †Anelcanidae; Carpenter, 1986

Extinct family of cricket-like animals

Anelcanidae is an extinct family of long-horned Orthoptera. There are at least two genera and two described species in Anelcanidae.

== Genera ==
These two genera belong to the family Anelcanidae:

- † Anelcana Carpenter, 1986
- † Petrelcana Carpenter, 1966
