= Tathra =

Tathra may refer to:

- Tathra, New South Wales, an Australian town
- Tathra National Park, a national park in Western Australia
- Tathra (insect), a genus of crickets in the subfamily Phalangopsinae
