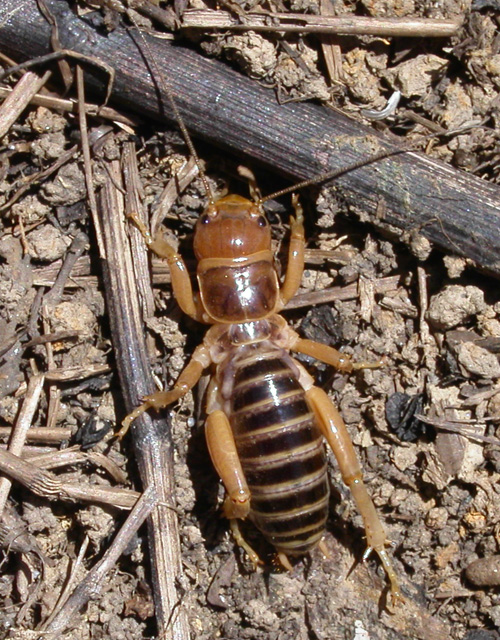
- Stenopelmatus fuscus

Scientific classification
- Kingdom: Animalia
- Phylum: Arthropoda
- Clade: Pancrustacea
- Class: Insecta
- Order: Orthoptera
- Suborder: Ensifera
- Infraorder: Tettigoniidea
- Superfamily: Stenopelmatoidea; Burmeister, 1838

Families
- See text

= Stenopelmatoidea =

Superfamily of cricket-like animals

Stenopelmatoidea is a superfamily of insects in the order Orthoptera; in some older classifications this group was referred to as Gryllacridoidea.

== Classification ==
The classification and constituency of Stenopelmatoidea is an ongoing source of controversy, with different authorities proposing radically different arrangements. At present, the majority of researchers appear to be mostly in consensus that Stenopelmatoidea comprises several well-separated lineages, at least three of which (Anostostomatidae, Gryllacrididae, and Stenopelmatidae) can be reasonably well-defined, and have molecular evidence that supports their recognition as monophyletic groups. At least one other authority, working exclusively with morphological characters, has instead proposed that Stenopelmatoidea contains only two lineages (Anostostomatidae and Stenopelmatidae), the latter of which not only includes Gryllacrididae as a subfamily, but also the entire superfamily Schizodactyloidea, similarly reduced to the rank of subfamily (e.g.), a result explicitly rejected by other researchers.

In most classifications, Stenopelmatoidea consists of four families:

- Anostostomatidae – wētā, king crickets
- Cooloolidae – Cooloola monsters
- Gryllacrididae – leaf-rolling crickets
- Stenopelmatidae – Jerusalem crickets
