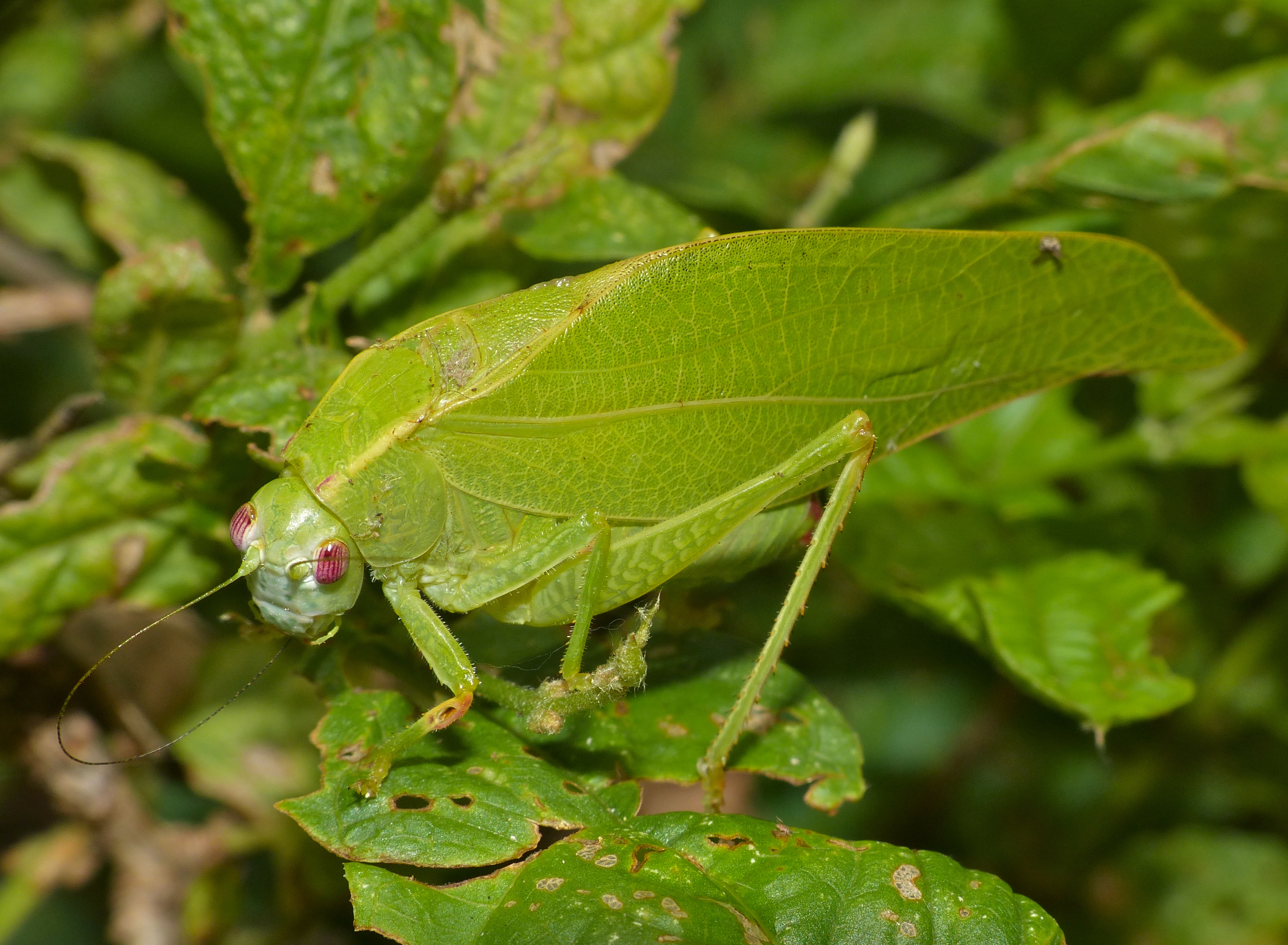
- Catoptropteryx aurita

Scientific classification
- Kingdom: Animalia
- Phylum: Arthropoda
- Class: Insecta
- Order: Orthoptera
- Suborder: Ensifera
- Infraorder: Tettigoniidea; Kevan, 1982

= Tettigoniidea =

Infraorder of cricket-like animals

Tettigoniidea is an infraorder of the order Orthoptera, with six extant families.

== Families ==
The Orthoptera Species File lists:

- Superfamily Hagloidea Handlirsch, 1906
  - †Eospilopteronidae Cockerell, 1916
  - †Haglidae Handlirsch, 1906
  - †Hagloedischiidae Gorochov, 1986
  - †Prezottophlebiidae Martins-Neto, 2007
  - Prophalangopsidae Kirby, 1906 (grigs)
  - †Tuphellidae Gorochov, 1988
  - †Tzetzenulia Gorochov, 1990
- Superfamily †Phasmomimoidea Sharov, 1968
  - †Phasmomimidae Sharov, 1968
- Superfamily Stenopelmatoidea Burmeister, 1838 (wetas & king crickets)
  - Anostostomatidae Saussure, 1859
  - Cooloolidae Rentz, 1980
  - Gryllacrididae Blanchard, 1845
  - Stenopelmatidae Burmeister, 1838
- Superfamily Tettigonioidea Krauss, 1902 (bush crickets or katydids)
  - †Haglotettigoniidae Gorochov, 1988
  - †Permotettigoniidae Nel & Garrouste, 2016
  - Tettigoniidae Krauss, 1902

Incertae sedis

- †Tettoraptor maculatus Gorochov, 2012
