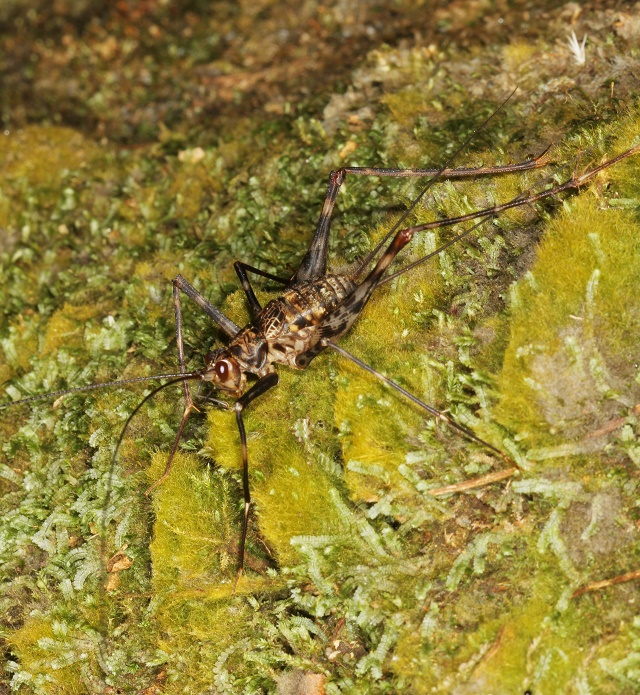
- Phalangacris alluaudi

Scientific classification
- Kingdom: Animalia
- Phylum: Arthropoda
- Clade: Pancrustacea
- Class: Insecta
- Order: Orthoptera
- Suborder: Ensifera
- Family: Phalangopsidae
- Subfamily: Phalangopsinae; Blanchard, 1845

Genera
- See text

Synonyms
- Phalangopsites Blanchard, 1845; Phalangopsitidae Bruner, 1916; Phalangopsinae Hebard, 1928; Phalangopsidae Chopard, 1949

= Phalangopsinae =

Subfamily of crickets

Phalangopsinae, occasionally known as spider crickets, are a subfamily of crickets in the family Phalangopsidae. Members of Phalangopsinae are found worldwide in tropical and subtropical regions. Most species in the subfamily are nocturnal and can be found in rocky areas, near fallen wood, and the understory of forests. Some species are gregarious, gathering in large numbers.

== Taxonomy ==
Placement of Phalangopsinae and its genera has been controversial, with the group previously being placed family Gryllidae. The Orthoptera Species File currently lists the following tribes and genera:

=== Endacustini ===
Auth.: Gorochov, 1986; distribution: Australia and SW Pacific islands

- Anendacusta Gorochov, 2003
- Discotathra Gorochov, 2003
- Endacusta Brunner von Wattenwyl, 1873
- Endotaria Chopard, 1951
- Itarotathra Gorochov, 2003
- Lucienia Gorochov, 1986
- Nesitathra Otte & Rentz, 1985
- Protathra Desutter-Grandcolas, 1997
- Pseudendacusta Gorochov, 2003
- Tathra (insect) Otte & Alexander, 1983
- Zaclotathra Gorochov, 2003

=== Luzaropsini ===
Auth.: Gorochov, 1986; distribution: Sri Lanka, Bangladesh, W. Malesia

- Larandopsis Chopard, 1924
- Luzaropsis Chopard, 1925
- Terrozacla Gorochov, 2014

=== Otteiini ===
Auth.: Koçak & Kemal, 2009 (synonyms Cophusini, Otteini); distribution: central America & Caribbean

1. Cubacophus Ruíz-Baliú & Otte, 1997
2. Dominicophus Yong, 2017
3. Hortacophus Cadena-Castañeda, 2021
4. Hubbellcophus Cadena-Castañeda, 2021
5. Otteius Koçak & Kemal, 2009
6. Paracophus Chopard, 1947
7. Tohila Hubbell, 1938
8. Venegascophus Cadena-Castañeda, 2021

=== Phalangopsini ===
Auth.: Blanchard, 1845; distribution: widespread in tropics.

- subtribe Heterogryllina Hebard, 1928
  - monotypic genus Aspidogryllus A. singularis Chopard, 1933
  - monotypic genus Hemicophus H. paranae Saussure, 1878
  - monotypic genus Heterogryllus H. ocellaris Saussure, 1874
  - monotypic genus Howeta H. pacifica Otte & Rentz, 1985
- subtribe Indozaclina Gorochov, 2018
  - monotypic genus Indozacla I. discifera (Gorochov, 2003)
  - Kempiola Uvarov, 1940
  - Opiliosina Desutter-Grandcolas, 2012
  - Phalangopsina Chopard, 1933
- subtribe Modestozarina Gorochov, 2014
  - monotypic genus Daedalonotum D. daedalum Gorochov, 2014
  - Endecous Saussure, 1878
  - Modestozara Gorochov, 2014
- subtribe Nemozarina Gorochov, 2014
  - Anemozara Gorochov, 2014
  - Lernecella Hebard, 1928
  - Nemozara Gorochov, 2014
- subtribe Parendacustina Gorochov, 2014
  - Arachnomimus Saussure, 1897
  - Longizacla Gorochov, 2003
  - Luzonogryllus Yamasaki, 1978
  - Parendacustes Chopard, 1924
- subtribe Phalangopsina Blanchard, 1845
  - Eidmanacris Chopard, 1956
  - Phalangopsis Serville, 1831
  - Philippopsis Desutter-Grandcolas, 1992
- subtribe not assigned
  - Laozacla Gorochov, 2014
  - Zacla Gorochov, 2003

=== incertae sedis ===
- Anophtalmotes Desutter-Grandcolas, 1995
- Antilliclodes Otte & Perez-Gelabert, 2009
- monotypic genus Dambachia D. eritheles Nischk & Otte, 2000
- monotypic genus Doposia D. tobago Otte & Perez-Gelabert, 2009
- monotypic genus† Eotrella E. mira Gorochov, 2012
- monotypic genus† Eozacla Gorochov, 2012
- monotypic genus Hirpinus H. afer Stål, 1855
- Kumalorina Otte & Perez-Gelabert, 2009
- Larandeicus Chopard, 1937
- monotypic genus Phaeogryllus P. fuscus Bolívar, 1912
- monotypic genus Prosecogryllus P. nossibianus Brancsik, 1892
- monotypic genus Socotracris S. kleukersi Felix & Desutter-Grandcolas, 2012
- monotypic genus Speluncasina S. annandalei (Chopard, 1928)
- monotypic genus Zaora Z. morbillosa Walker, 1869
