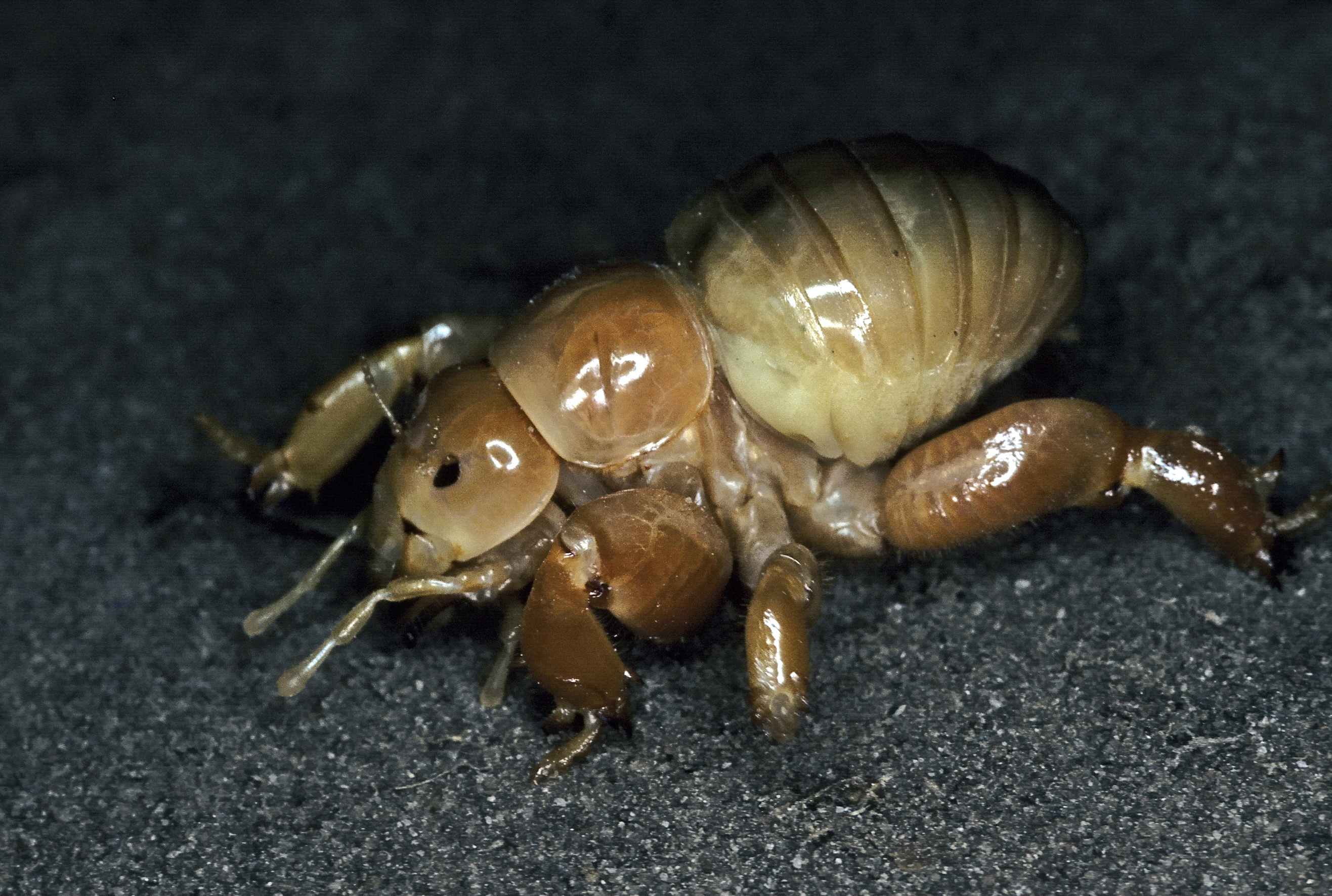

Scientific classification
- Domain: Eukaryota
- Kingdom: Animalia
- Phylum: Arthropoda
- Class: Insecta
- Order: Orthoptera
- Suborder: Ensifera
- Family: Cooloolidae
- Genus: Cooloola
- Species: C. propator

Binomial name
- Cooloola propator Rentz, 1980

= Cooloola monster =

Species of cricket-like animal

The Cooloola monster (Cooloola propator) is a large burrowing orthopteran of the family Cooloolidae, a family erected to accommodate it because it is so dissimilar to other ensiferans. It was discovered in 1980 in the Great Sandy National Park in Queensland, Australia, by David C. Rentz. Further members of the genus Cooloola were later discovered at other locations in Queensland.

== Description ==
The Cooloola monster is a robust subterranean insect, characterised by very short antennae with ten bead-like segments. This contrasts with other members of the suborder Ensifera which have thirty or more segments. The sexes are different, the male being brownish and well-sclerotized (armoured), while the female has a relatively soft exoskeleton and is usually whitish in colour, as are the juveniles. Males have short wings and fully functional eyes, while females have no wings and their eyes have a flat cornea and few facets. The mouthparts are also unusual for ensiferans, having a knife-shaped lacinia (tip of the maxilla) and small elongated mandibles. These mouthparts suggest that the insect is predatory. In the related species Cooloola ziljan, the lacinia has been observed in use as a digging tool. The legs are adapted for burrowing and the hind legs bear flattened spines for this purpose. The fore and mid-legs are about the same length and the hind-legs rather larger. The shape of the femur and the degree of spination of the tibia differ between males and females. The tarsus is elongate and dorso-ventrally flattened in males, and shorter and less flattened in females. The male has a slender abdomen but the female's abdomen is bulbous with a very short ovipositor.

== Behaviour ==
Very little is known of the natural history of this insect. The male is sometimes seen on the surface at night but the female seems to remain permanently underground. The insects live in sandy soil near streams under Australian sheoak trees and are occasionally found hiding under stones or logs.
