= Baissogryllidae =

Scientific classification
- Domain: Eukaryota
- Kingdom: Animalia
- Phylum: Arthropoda
- Class: Insecta
- Order: Orthoptera
- Suborder: Ensifera
- Superfamily: Grylloidea
- Family: †Baissogryllidae; Gorochov, 1985

Subfamilies
- See text

Extinct family of crickets

Baissogryllidae is an extinct family of crickets in the order Orthoptera. There are about 20 genera and 30 described species in Baissogryllidae.

== Genera ==
The genera of Baissogryllidae are divided into five subfamilies:

Subfamily †Baissogryllinae Gorochov, 1985

1. †Baissogryllus Sharov, 1968
2. †Eubaissogryllus Gorochov, 1985
3. †Ponomarenkoana Gorochov, 1992
4. †Sinagryllus Wang, et al, 2019
5. †Speculogryllus Gorochov, Jarzembowski & Coram, 2006
6. †Storozhenkoana Gorochov, 1992

Subfamily †Bontzaganiinae Gorochov, 1985

1. †Anglogryllus Gorochov, Jarzembowski & Coram, 2006
2. †Bontzagania Gorochov, 1985
3. †Castillogryllus Martins-Neto, 1995

Subfamily Cearagryllinae Martins-Neto, 2009

1. †Allocearagryllus Martins-Neto, 2009
2. †Cearagrylloides Martins-Neto & Vaz Tassi, 2009
3. †Cearagryllus Martins-Neto, 1991
4. †Cryptocearagryllus Martins-Neto & Vaz Tassi, 2009
5. †Notocearagryllus Martins-Neto, 1999
6. †Paracearagryllus Martins-Neto, 2009
7. †Santanagryllus Martins-Neto, 1991

Subfamily †Olindagryllinae Martins-Neto, 1999

1. †Olindagryllus Martins-Neto, 1999

Subfamily †Sharategiinae Gorochov, 1992

1. †Caririgryllus Martins-Neto, 1991
2. †Mongologryllus Gorochov, 1985
3. †Neosharategia Gorochov, 1992
4. †Sharategia Gorochov, 1992
