= Thueringoedischiidae =

Thueringoedischiidae Temporal range: Asselian

Scientific classification
- Domain: Eukaryota
- Kingdom: Animalia
- Phylum: Arthropoda
- Class: Insecta
- Order: Orthoptera
- Infraorder: †Elcanidea
- Superfamily: †Permoraphidioidea
- Family: †Thueringoedischiidae; Zessin, 1997

Extinct family of cricket-like animals

Thueringoedischiidae is an extinct family of long-horned Orthoptera. There are at least three genera and three described species in Thueringoedischiidae.

== Genera ==
These three genera belong to the family Thueringoedischiidae:

- † Hymenelcana Gorochov, 2004
- † Permoedischia Kukalova, 1955
- † Thueringoedischia Zessin, 1997
