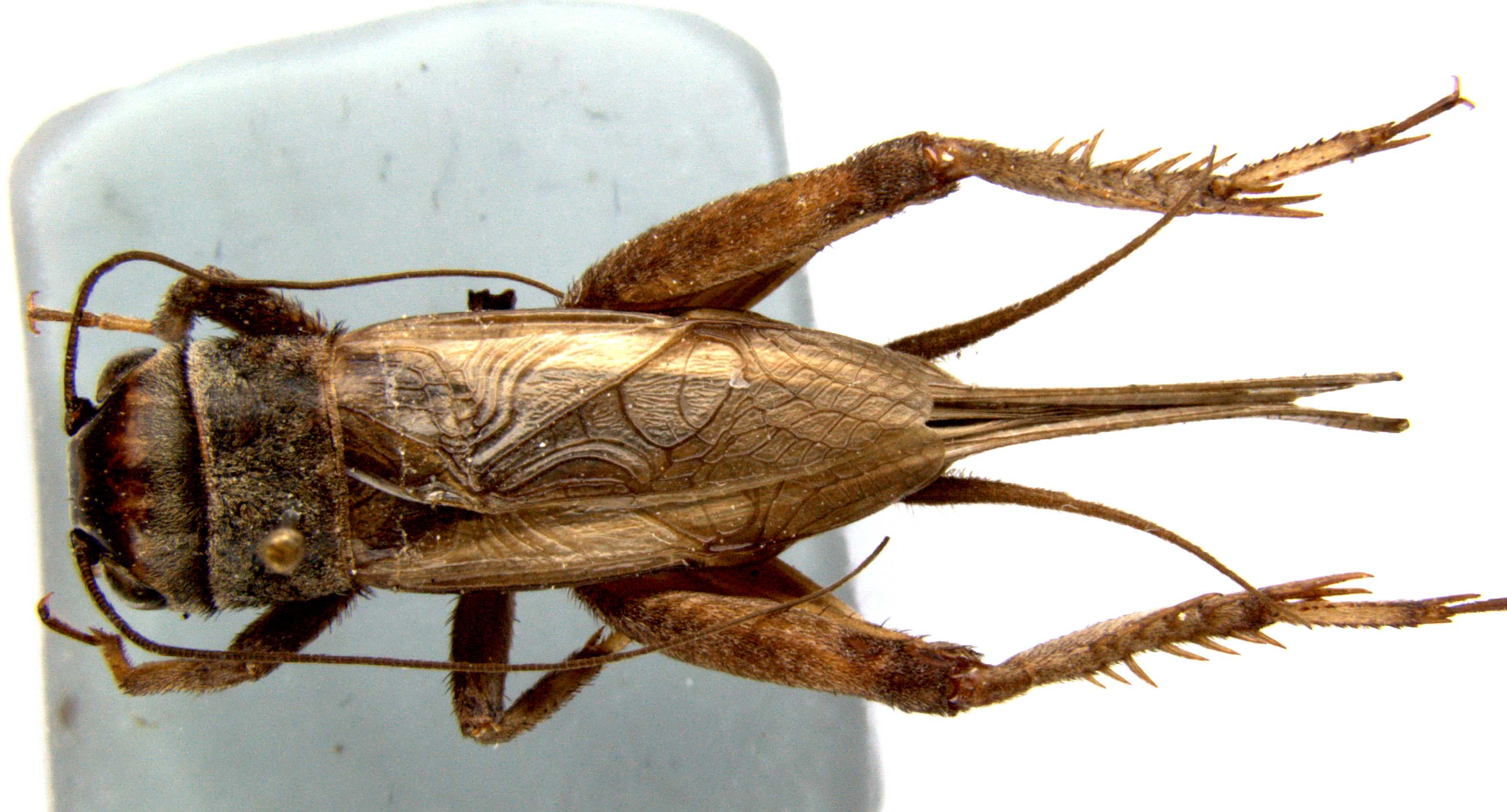
- Acheta hispanicus

Scientific classification
- Kingdom: Animalia
- Phylum: Arthropoda
- Class: Insecta
- Order: Orthoptera
- Suborder: Ensifera
- Infraorder: Gryllidea; Vickery, 1977

Superfamilies
- Grylloidea Laicharting, 1781; Gryllotalpoidea Leach, 1815

= Gryllidea =

Infraorder of cricket-like animals

Gryllidea is an infraorder that includes crickets and similar insects in the order Orthoptera. There are two superfamilies, and more than 6,000 described species in Gryllidea.

Velarifictorus micado

== Superfamilies and families ==
The Orthoptera Species File lists the following families in the infraorder Gryllidea:

=== Grylloidea ===
- † Baissogryllidae Gorochov, 1985
- Gryllidae Laicharting, 1781 (sometimes called "true crickets")
- Mogoplistidae Brunner von Wattenwyl, 1873 (scaly crickets)
- Oecanthidae Blanchard, 1845 (tree crickets, anomalous crickets)
- Phalangopsidae Blanchard, 1845
- †Protogryllidae Zeuner, 1937
- Trigonidiidae Saussure, 1874 (wood crickets, trigs or sword-tail crickets)
- Family unplaced
  - Pteroplistinae
  - genus †Bellosichnus Genise & Sánchez, 2017

=== Gryllotalpoidea ===
- Gryllotalpidae Leach, 1815 (mole crickets)
- Myrmecophilidae Saussure, 1874 (ant crickets)
