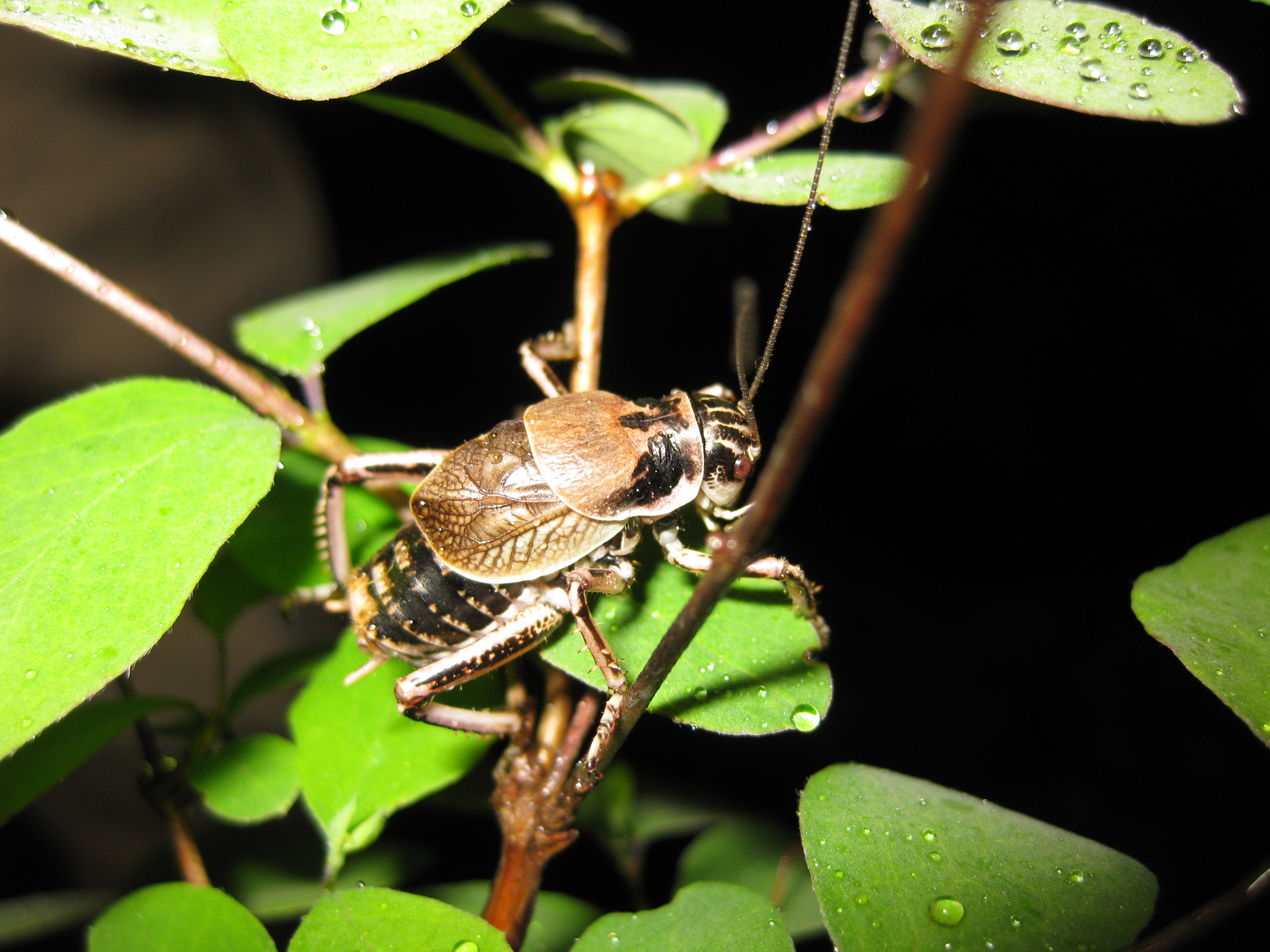
- Cyphoderris buckelli
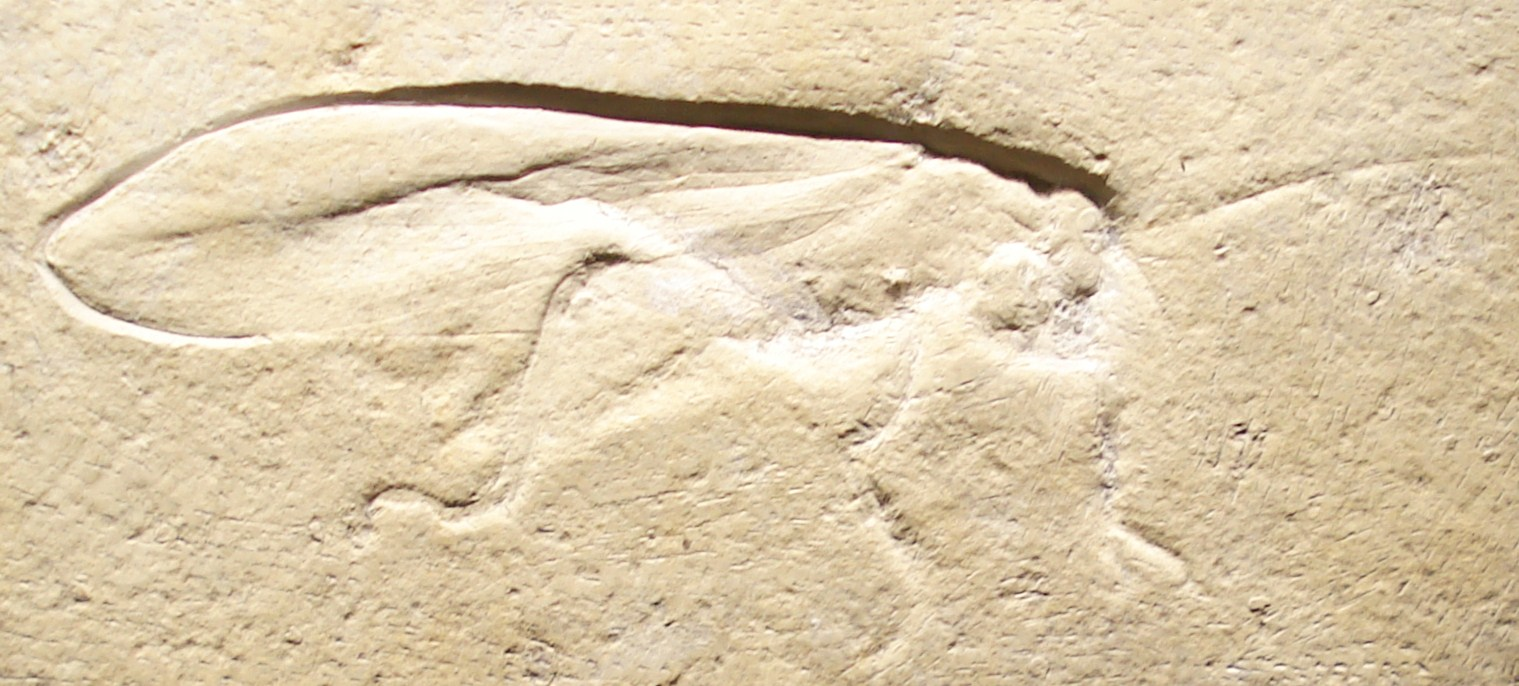
- Pycnophlebia speciosa, (Jurassic)

Scientific classification
- Domain: Eukaryota
- Kingdom: Animalia
- Phylum: Arthropoda
- Class: Insecta
- Order: Orthoptera
- Suborder: Ensifera
- Infraorder: Tettigoniidea
- Superfamily: Hagloidea; Handlirsch, 1906

Families
- See text

= Hagloidea =

Hagloidea Temporal range: Permian to Recent Permian–Recent

Superfamily of cricket-like animals

The superfamily Hagloidea are insects belonging to the order Orthoptera: Ensifera; they are now represented by the extant Prophalangopsidae, with many extinct genera and families (see below). The group in its broad sense has been suggested to be paraphyletic and ancestral to all other members of Tettigoniidea.

== Families ==
- †Eospilopteronidae Cockerell, 1916
- †Haglidae Handlirsch, 1906
- †Hagloedischiidae Gorochov, 1986
- †Prezottophlebiidae Martins-Neto, 2007
- Prophalangopsidae Kirby, 1906
- †Tuphellidae Gorochov, 1988
- incertae sedis
  - †Tzetzenulia Gorochov, 1990
