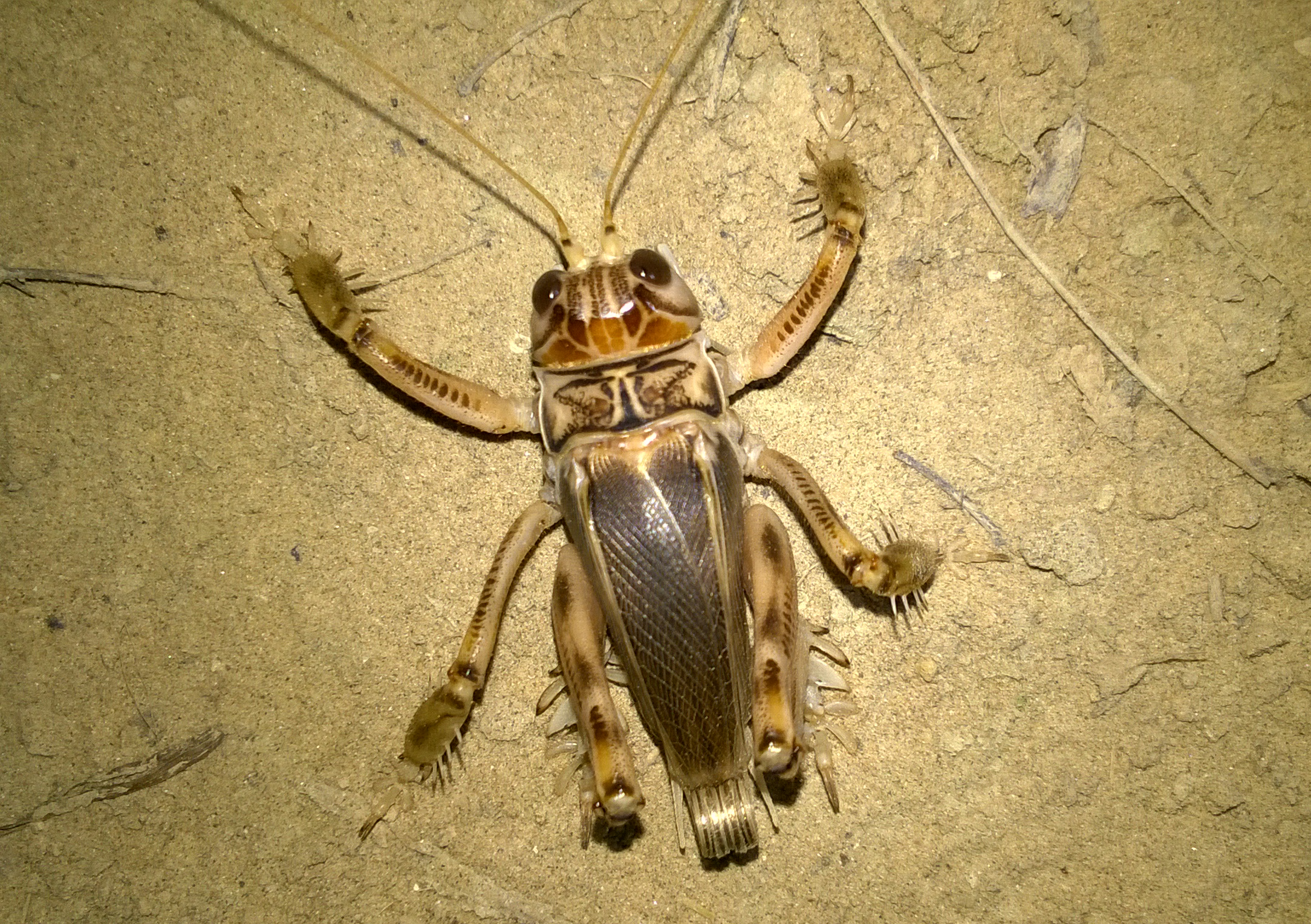
- Schizodactylus monstrosus from Rajasthan

Scientific classification
- Kingdom: Animalia
- Phylum: Arthropoda
- Clade: Pancrustacea
- Class: Insecta
- Order: Orthoptera
- Suborder: Ensifera
- Superfamily: Schizodactyloidea
- Family: Schizodactylidae; Karny, 1927

Synonyms
- Brauckmanniidae Martins-Neto 2007; Comicinae Ander, 1939; Schizodactylini Blanchard, 1845

= Schizodactylidae =

Schizodactylidae Temporal range: Early Cretaceous–Recent

Family of cricket-like animals

Schizodactylidae is a family of orthopteran insects found in Asia and southern Africa, known as dune crickets or splay-footed crickets. They are usually found in desert and sandy areas. Species are predatory, including Schizodactylus inexspectatus. T. B. Fletcher notes that one captive individual did not feed on any vegetable matter. Fossils are known since the Early Cretaceous.

== Taxonomy ==
One extinct and two extant genera in the subfamily Schizodactylinae are included:

†Brauckmannia Martins-Neto, 2007

- monotypic †B. groeningae Martins-Neto, 2007 Crato Formation, Brazil, Early Cretaceous (Aptian)

Comicus Brunner von Wattenwyl, 1888

- Comicus capensis Brunner von Wattenwyl, 1888 - type species

=== Schizodactylus ===
Authority: Brullé, 1835; distribution: mainland Asia

1. Schizodactylus brevinotus Ingrisch, 2002
2. Schizodactylus burmanus Uvarov, 1935
3. Schizodactylus hesperus Bei-Bienko, 1967
4. Schizodactylus inexspectatus (Werner, F., 1901)
5. Schizodactylus jimo He, 2021
6. Schizodactylus minor Ander, 1938
7. Schizodactylus monstrosus (Drury, 1773) - type species (as Gryllus monstrosus Drury)
8. Schizodactylus salweenensis Dawwrueng et al., 2018
9. Schizodactylus tuberculatus Ander, 1938
