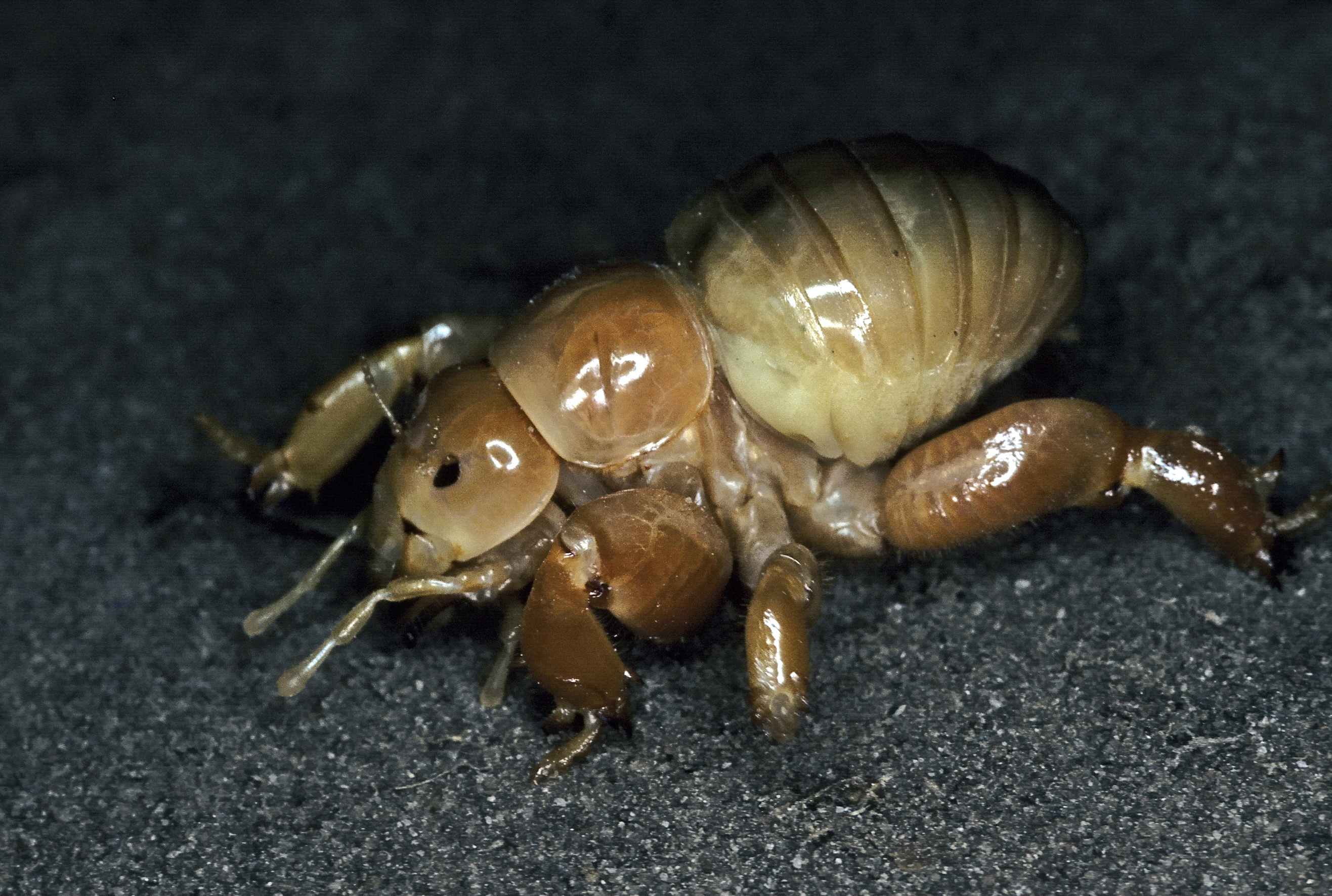
- Cooloola propator – Cooloola monster

Scientific classification
- Domain: Eukaryota
- Kingdom: Animalia
- Phylum: Arthropoda
- Class: Insecta
- Order: Orthoptera
- Suborder: Ensifera
- Family: Cooloolidae; Rentz, 1980
- Subfamily: Cooloolinae; Rentz, 1980
- Genus: Cooloola; Rentz, 1980

Species
- 4, see text

= Cooloola (insect) =

Genus of cricket-like animals

Cooloola is a genus of ensiferan orthopterans known as Cooloola monsters. It is the only genus in the subfamily Cooloolinae and family Cooloolidae of the superfamily Stenopelmatoidea.

Four species are known from this family, all endemic to Queensland, Australia. The name originated from the discovery of the best-known member of the family, the Cooloola monster (Cooloola propator), in the Cooloola National Park.

Little is known about their life histories as they lead an almost entirely subterranean existence, but they are believed to prey on other soil-dwelling invertebrates. Cooloola monsters are unusual in comparison with other members of the primitive superfamily Stenopelmatoidea in that the cooloolids' antennae are considerably shorter than their body lengths.

== Classification ==
While often treated as a family, molecular evidence suggests that cooloolids are in fact aberrant members of the family Anostostomatidae, and the genus Cooloola might not be monophyletic.

Species include:

- Cooloola dingo Rentz, 1986 – dingo monster
- Cooloola pearsoni Rentz, 1999 – Pearson's monster
- Cooloola propator Rentz, 1980 – Cooloola monster
- Cooloola ziljan Rentz, 1986 – sugarcane monster
