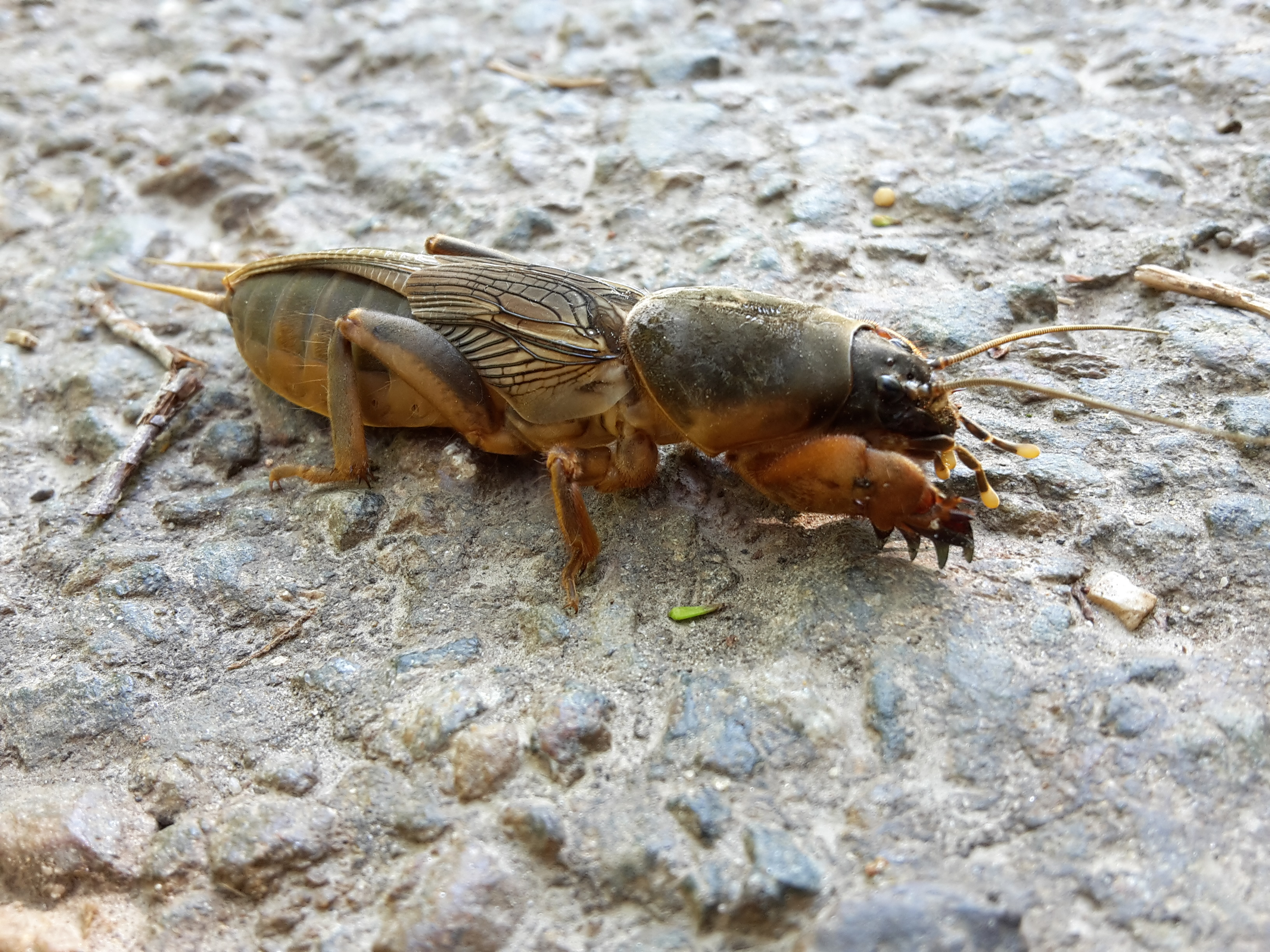
- Gryllotalpa gryllotalpa

Scientific classification
- Kingdom: Animalia
- Phylum: Arthropoda
- Class: Insecta
- Order: Orthoptera
- Suborder: Ensifera
- Infraorder: Gryllidea
- Superfamily: Gryllotalpoidea; Leach, 1815

Type genus
- Gryllotalpa Latreille, 1802

= Gryllotalpoidea =

Superfamily of cricket-like animals

The Gryllotalpoidea are a superfamily of insects that includes the mole crickets and the ant crickets. The type genus is Gryllotalpa.

Recent (2015) molecular phylogenetic studies support the monophyly of the cricket clade (Gryllidea in the Orthoptera Species File) and its subdivision into two clades: Gryllotalpidae and Myrmecophilidae on the one hand, and all the other crickets (i.e. crickets sensu stricto: seven monophyletic clades, including the scaly crickets Mogoplistidae and Gryllidae).

== Families and subfamilies ==
The Orthoptera Species File lists the following families and subfamilies:

- Gryllotalpidae Leach, 1815 - mole crickets
  - Gryllotalpinae Leach, 1815
  - †Marchandiinae Gorochov, 2010
  - Scapteriscinae Zeuner, 1939
- Myrmecophilidae Saussure, 1874 - ant crickets
  - Bothriophylacinae Miram, 1934
  - Myrmecophilinae Saussure, 1874
