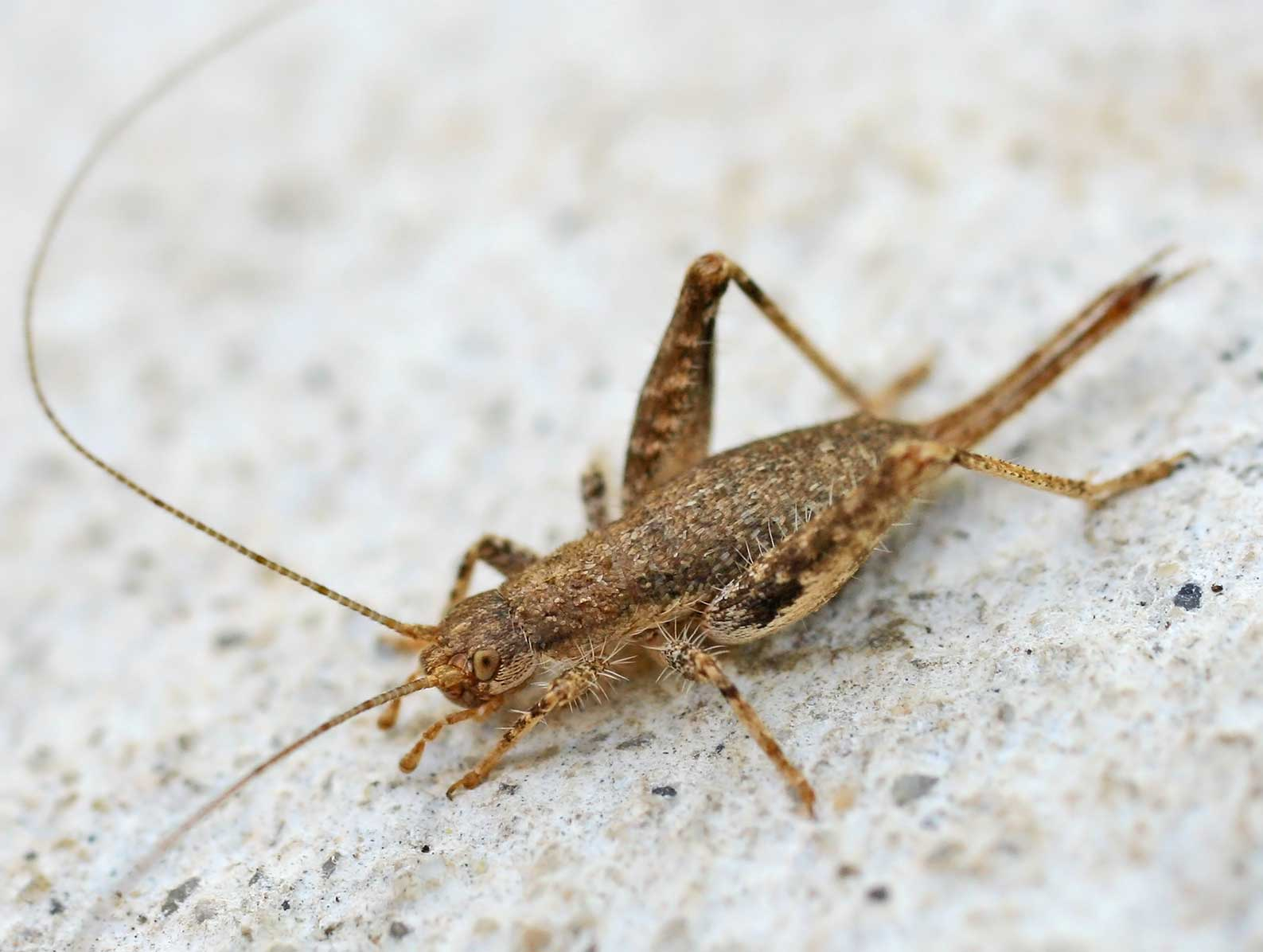
- Arachnocephalus vestitus (Mogoplistidae)

Scientific classification
- Kingdom: Animalia
- Phylum: Arthropoda
- Clade: Pancrustacea
- Class: Insecta
- Order: Orthoptera
- Suborder: Ensifera
- Infraorder: Gryllidea
- Superfamily: Grylloidea; Laicharting, 1781

Families
- See text

= Grylloidea =

Grylloidea Temporal range: Triassic - Recent 230–0 Ma

Superfamily of cricket-like animals

Grylloidea is the superfamily of insects, in the order Orthoptera, known as crickets. It includes the "true crickets", scaly crickets, wood crickets and many other subfamilies, now placed in six extant families; some genera are only known from fossils.

Grylloidea dates from the Triassic period. It contains 6,082 known living species in 750 genera, as well as 83 extinct genera.

== Characteristics ==
The features which distinguish crickets in the superfamily Grylloidea from other Ensiferans are long, thread-like antennae, three tarsal segments, slender tactile cerci at the tip of the abdomen and bulbous sensory bristles on the cerci. They are the only insects to share this combination of characteristics.

The term cricket is popularly used for any cricket-like insect in the order Ensifera, being applied to the bush crickets (Tettigoniidae), Jerusalem crickets (Stenopelmatus), camel crickets and cave crickets (Rhaphidophoridae) and wētā (Anostostomatidae), and the relatives of these. All these insects have four tarsal segments and are probably more closely related to each other than they are to the true crickets, Gryllidae.

The body is cylindrical in most Grylloideans, but in some it is oval. The antennae are long and threadlike, except in the family Gryllotalpidae in which they are much shorter and brush-like. The pronotum is unkeeled and the sternal plates are flat, unadorned with flaps or spines. The tarsus has three segments and the tibia of the front leg bears the sound-detecting tympanal organs. The forewing of males bears the stridulatory organ, with a sound being created when a file on one wing is rubbed by a scraper on the other. There are two cerci at the tip of the abdomen and there is no stylus on the subgenital plate.

== Classification ==
The following families are included in this superfamily; many of the common names can be placed at the subfamily level:

- †Baissogryllidae Gorochov, 1985
- Gryllidae Laicharting, 1781 – includes the "true crickets"
- Oecanthidae Blanchard, 1845 – including tree crickets and "bush crickets" (American usage)
- Mogoplistidae Costa, 1855 – scaly crickets and allies
- Phalangopsidae Blanchard, 1845 – spider crickets, beetle- or bell-crickets and relatives - mostly southern hemisphere
- †Protogryllidae Zeuner, 1937 (West-central Asia)
- Pteroplistidae Chopard, 1936 (tropical Asia) - feather-winged crickets
- Trigonidiidae Saussure, 1874 (World-wide)
  - subfamily Nemobiinae Saussure, 1877 - includes wood crickets
  - subfamily Trigonidiinae Saussure, 1874 - 'sword-tail crickets', trigs

=== Excluded families ===
The following have now been placed in their separate superfamily Gryllotalpoidea.

- Gryllotalpidae Leach, 1815 – mole crickets
- Myrmecophilidae Saussure, 1874 - ant crickets.
