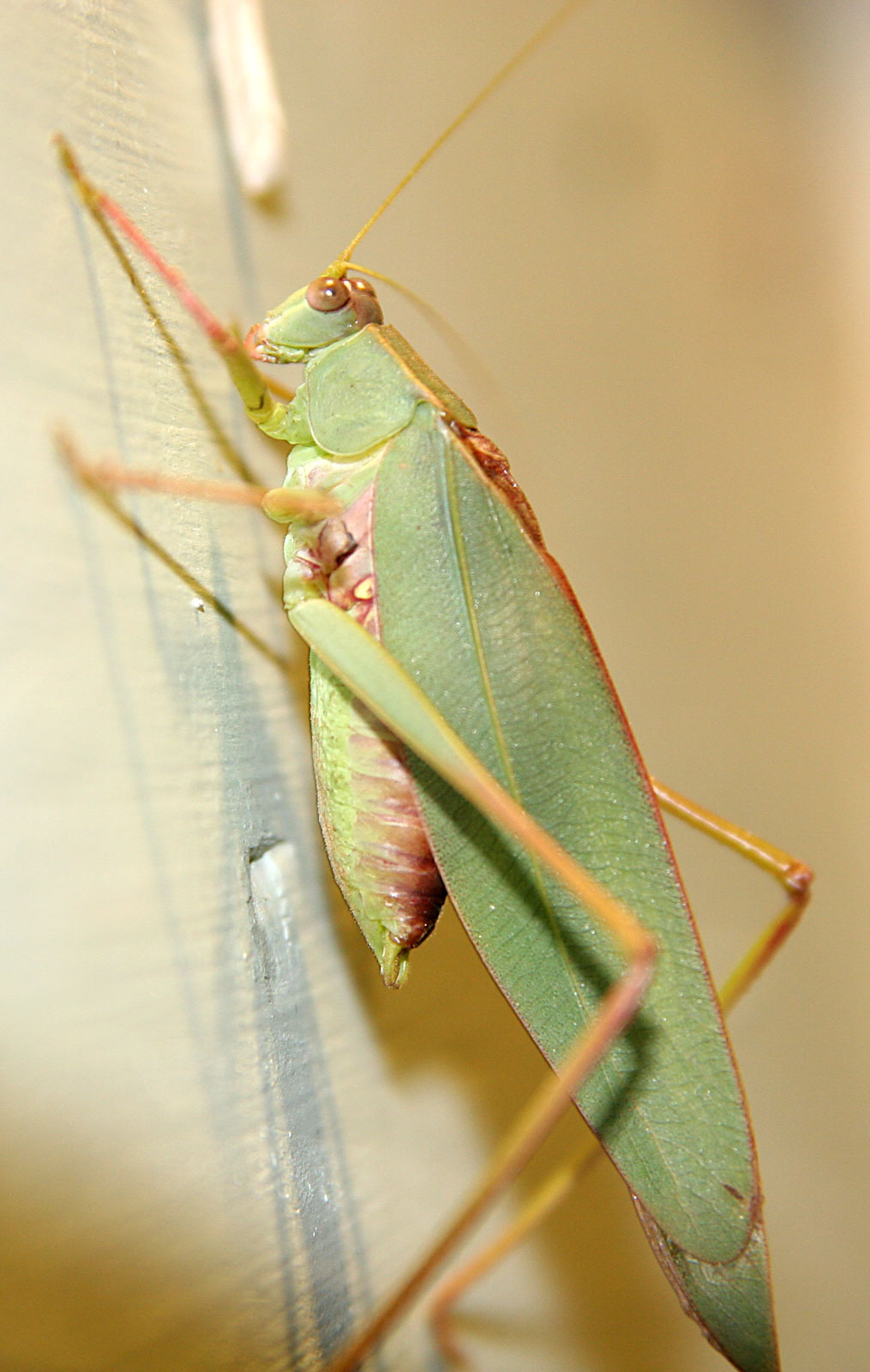
- A bush cricket or katydid

Scientific classification
- Kingdom: Animalia
- Phylum: Arthropoda
- Clade: Pancrustacea
- Class: Insecta
- Order: Orthoptera
- Suborder: Ensifera

Superfamilies and families
- See text

= Ensifera =

Ensifera Temporal range: Artinskian/Kungurian–Holocene, 272.3–0 Ma

Suborder of cricket-like animals

Ensifera is a suborder of insects that includes the various types of crickets and their allies, including true crickets, camel crickets, bush crickets or katydids, grigs, wētā, and Cooloola monsters. This and the suborder Caelifera (grasshoppers and their allies) make up the order Orthoptera. Unlike the Caelifera, the Ensifera contain numerous members that are partially carnivorous, feeding on other insects, as well as plants.

Fossils of the early stem-ensiferan Raphogla from the Early Permian around 290-275 million years ago indicate that the group had split from Caelifera by this time.

Ensifer is Latin for "sword bearer", and refers to the typically elongated and blade-like ovipositor of the females.

== Characteristics ==
Characteristics shared by the two orthopteran suborders, Caelifera and Ensifera, are the mouthparts adapted for biting and chewing, the modified prothorax, the hind legs modified for jumping, the wing shape and venation, and the sound-producing stridulatory organs.

Ensiferans are distinguished from Caeliferans by their elongated, threadlike antennae, which are often longer than the length of their bodies and have over 30 segments (except in the subterranean Cooloolidae family). For this reason, they are sometimes referred to as "long-horned orthopterans". In the families in which the males sing, the fore wings have modifications that include toothed veins and scrapers for making the noise, and the surrounding membranous areas amplify the sound. In these groups, the sound-detecting tympanal organs are located on the tibiae of the front legs. The tarsi have three segments and the ovipositor is blade-like or needle-like. The male attaches the spermatophore externally to the female's gonopore. The spermatophore is often surrounded by a proteinaceous spermatophylax, the function of which is to provide a nutritional nuptial gift to the female.

== Taxonomy ==
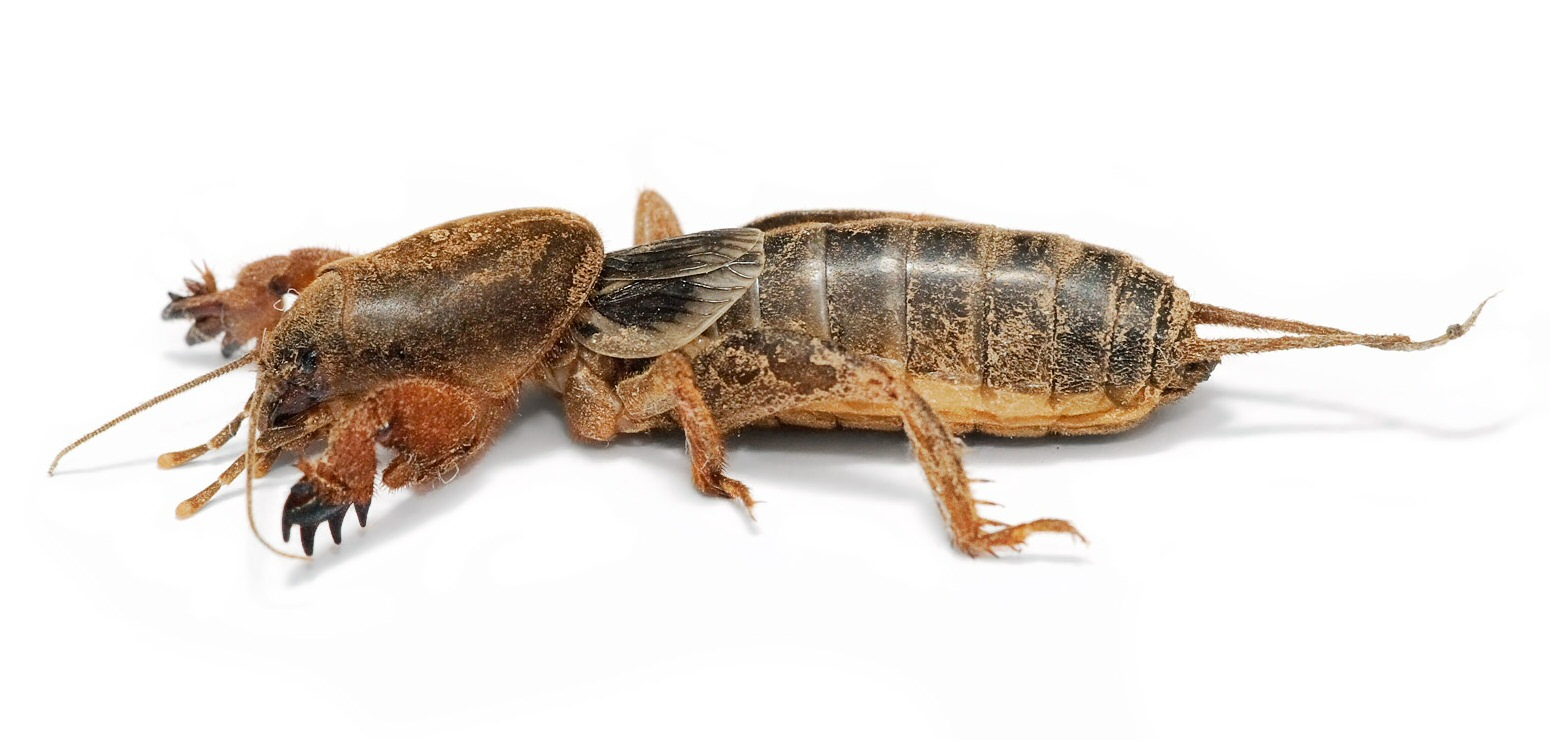
A mole cricket, showing the front legs specialised for digging

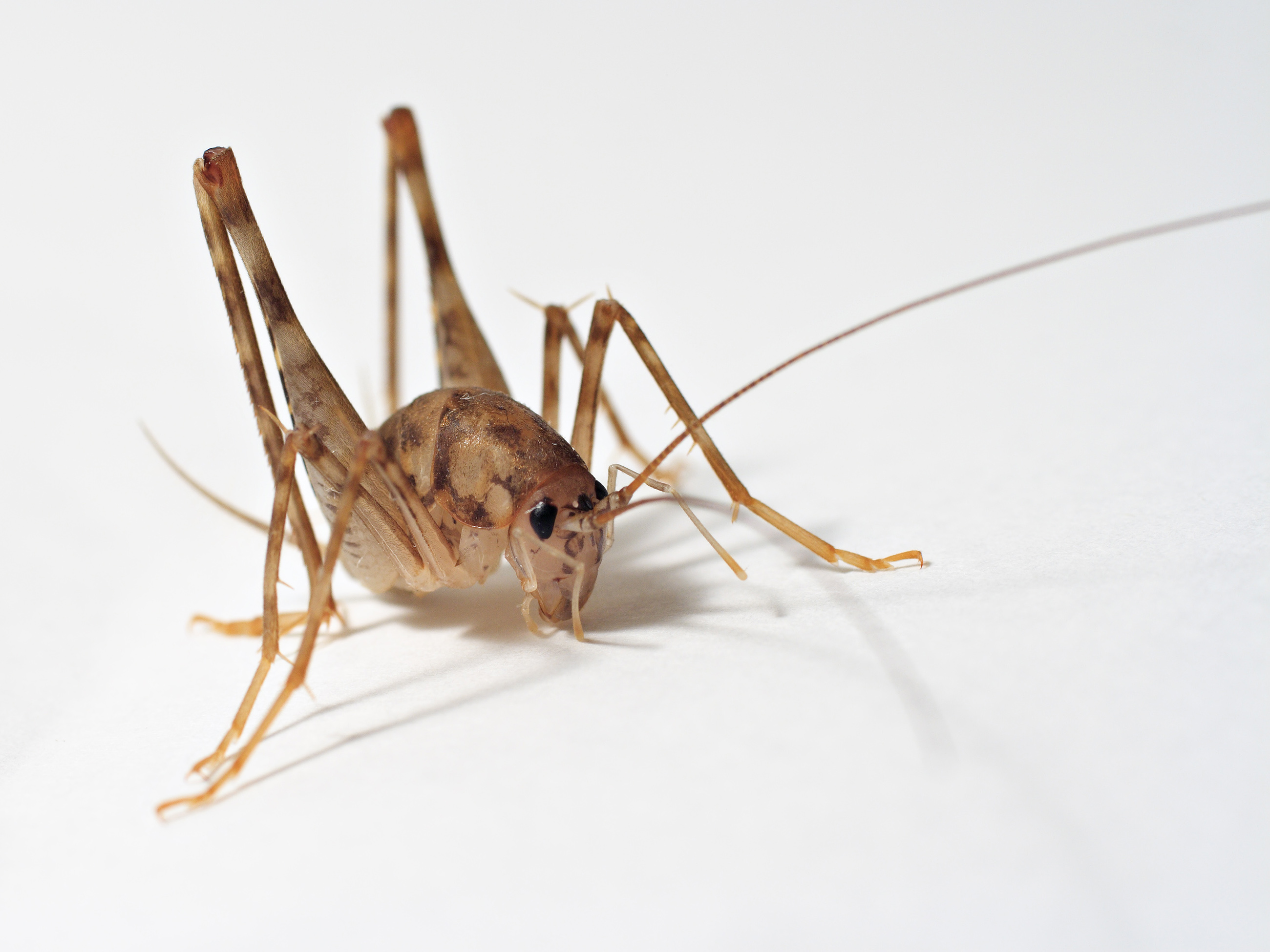
A cave cricket, showing the long hind legs and antennae

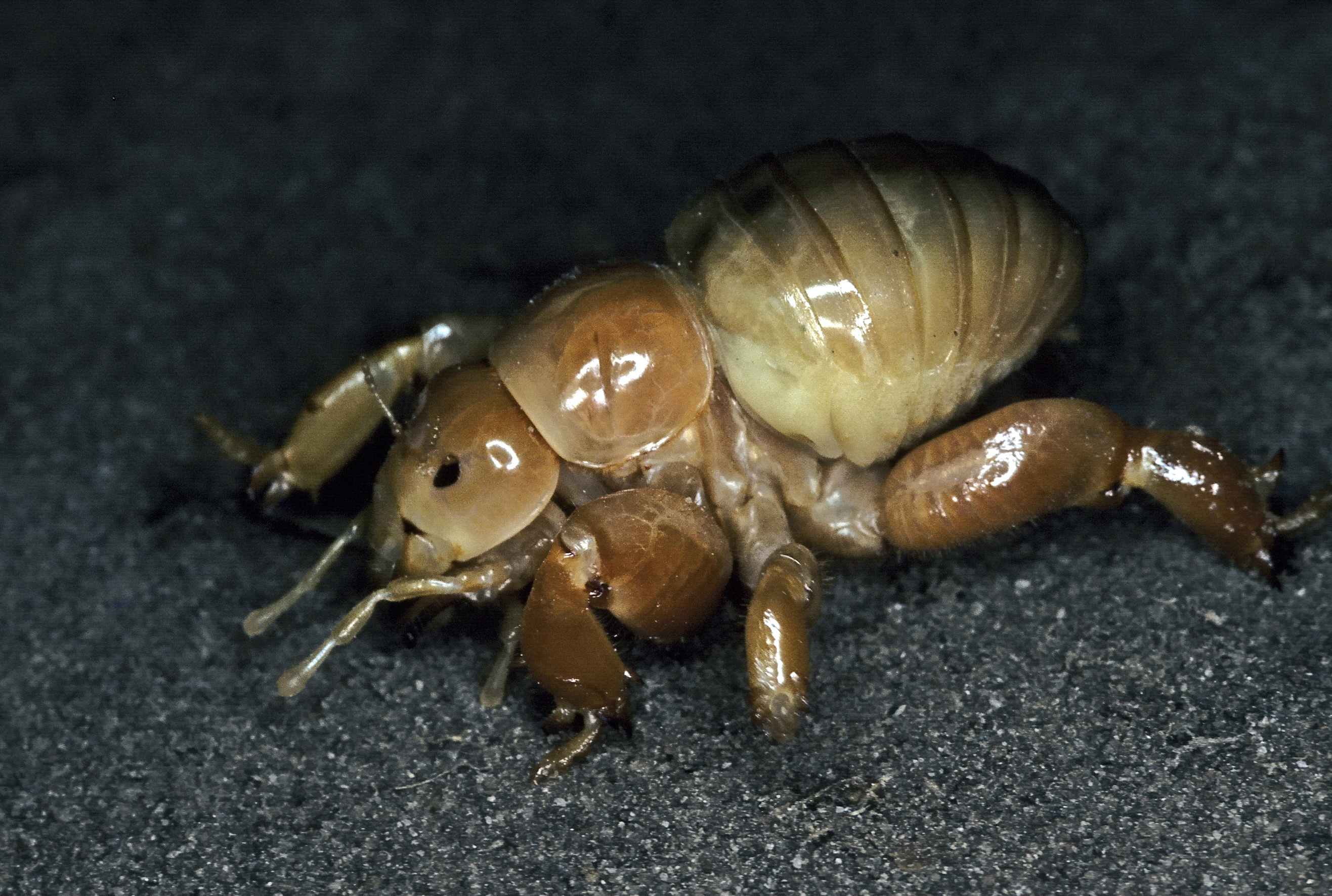
A Cooloola monster, a subterranean family from Queensland, Australia

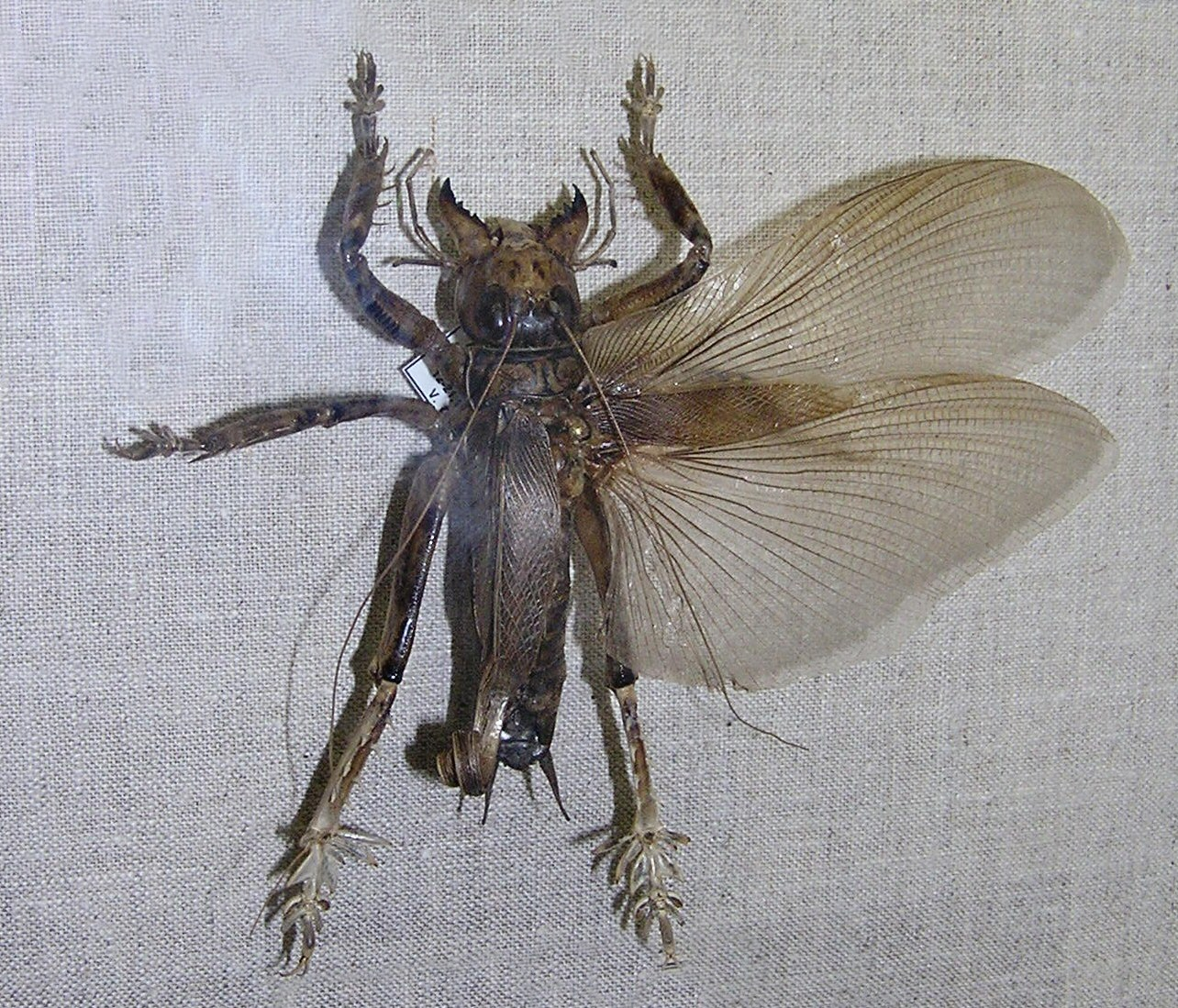
A splay-footed cricket from South India

The Orthoptera Species File database lists the following superfamilies and families.

- Infraorder †Elcanidea? (affinities of elcanoids to Ensifera is disputed)
  - Superfamily †Elcanoidea
    - Family †Elcanidae (Late Triassic - Paleocene)
    - Family †Permelcanidae (Early Permian - Late Triassic)
  - Superfamily †Permoraphidioidea
    - Family †Permoraphidiidae (Permian)
    - Family †Pseudelcanidae (Early Permian)
    - Family †Thueringoedischiidae (Early Permian)
    - Family incertae sedis
      - Genus †Acridiites Heer, 1865
- Infraorder Gryllidea
  - Superfamily Grylloidea
    - Family †Baissogryllidae
    - Family Gryllidae - true crickets
    - Family Mogoplistidae - scaly crickets
    - Family Phalangopsidae Blanchard, 1845
    - Family †Protogryllidae Zeuner, 1937
    - Family Trigonidiidae Saussure, 1874
  - Superfamily Gryllotalpoidea Leach, 1815
    - Family Gryllotalpidae Leach, 1815 – mole crickets
    - Family Myrmecophilidae Saussure, 1874 - ant crickets
- Infraorder †Oedischiidea
  - Superfamily †Oedischioidea Handlirsch, 1906
    - Family †Anelcanidae Carpenter, 1986
    - Family †Bintoniellidae Handlirsch, 1939
    - Family †Mesoedischiidae Gorochov, 1987
    - Family †Oedischiidae Handlirsch, 1906
    - Family †Proparagryllacrididae Riek, 1956
    - Family †Pruvostitidae Zalessky, 1929
    - Family incertae sedis
      - Genus †Crinoedischia Béthoux & Beckemeyer, 2007
      - Genus †Loxoedischia Beckemeyer, 2011
  - Superfamily †Triassomantoidea Tillyard, 1922
    - Family †Adumbratomorphidae Gorochov, 1987
    - Family †Triassomantidae Tillyard, 1922
  - Superfamily †Xenopteroidea Riek, 1955
    - Family †Xenopteridae Riek, 1955
  - Superfamily incertae sedis
    - family †Permotettigoniidae Nel & Garrouste, 2016
    - Family incertae sedis
      - Genus †Permophyllum Prokop, et al, 2015
- Infraorder Tettigoniidea
  - Superfamily Hagloidea - grigs
    - Family †Eospilopteronidae Cockerell, 1916
    - Family †Haglidae Handlirsch, 1906
    - Family †Hagloedischiidae Gorochov, 1986
    - Family †Prezottophlebiidae Martins-Neto, 2007
    - Family Prophalangopsidae Kirby, 1906
    - Family †Tuphellidae Gorochov, 1988
  - Superfamily †Phasmomimoidea Sharov, 1968
    - Family †Phasmomimidae Sharov, 1968
  - Superfamily Rhaphidophoroidea Walker, 1869
    - Family Rhaphidophoridae Walker, 1869 - camel crickets, cave crickets, cave weta
  - Superfamily Schizodactyloidea Blanchard, 1845
    - Family Schizodactylidae Blanchard, 1845 - dune or splay-footed crickets
  - Superfamily Stenopelmatoidea Burmeister, 1838
    - Family Anostostomatidae Saussure, 1859 - weta (except cave weta), king crickets
    - Family Cooloolidae Rentz, 1980 - Cooloola monsters
    - Family Gryllacrididae Blanchard, 1845 - leaf-rolling crickets
    - Family Stenopelmatidae Burmeister, 1838 - Jerusalem crickets
  - Superfamily Tettigonioidea Krauss, 1902
    - Family †Haglotettigoniidae Gorochov, 1988
    - Family Tettigoniidae Krauss, 1902 - bush crickets, katydids, koringkrieks
  - Superfamily Incertae sedis
    - Family incertae sedis
      - Genus †Tettoraptor Gorochov, 2012
- Infraorder incertae sedis
  - Superfamily †Gryllavoidea Gorochov, 1986
    - Family †Gryllavidae Gorochov, 1986
- Superfamily Incertae sedis
  - Family †Palaeorehniidae (syn "Zeuneropterinae")
  - Family †Vitimiidae

== Evolution ==
=== Fossil history ===
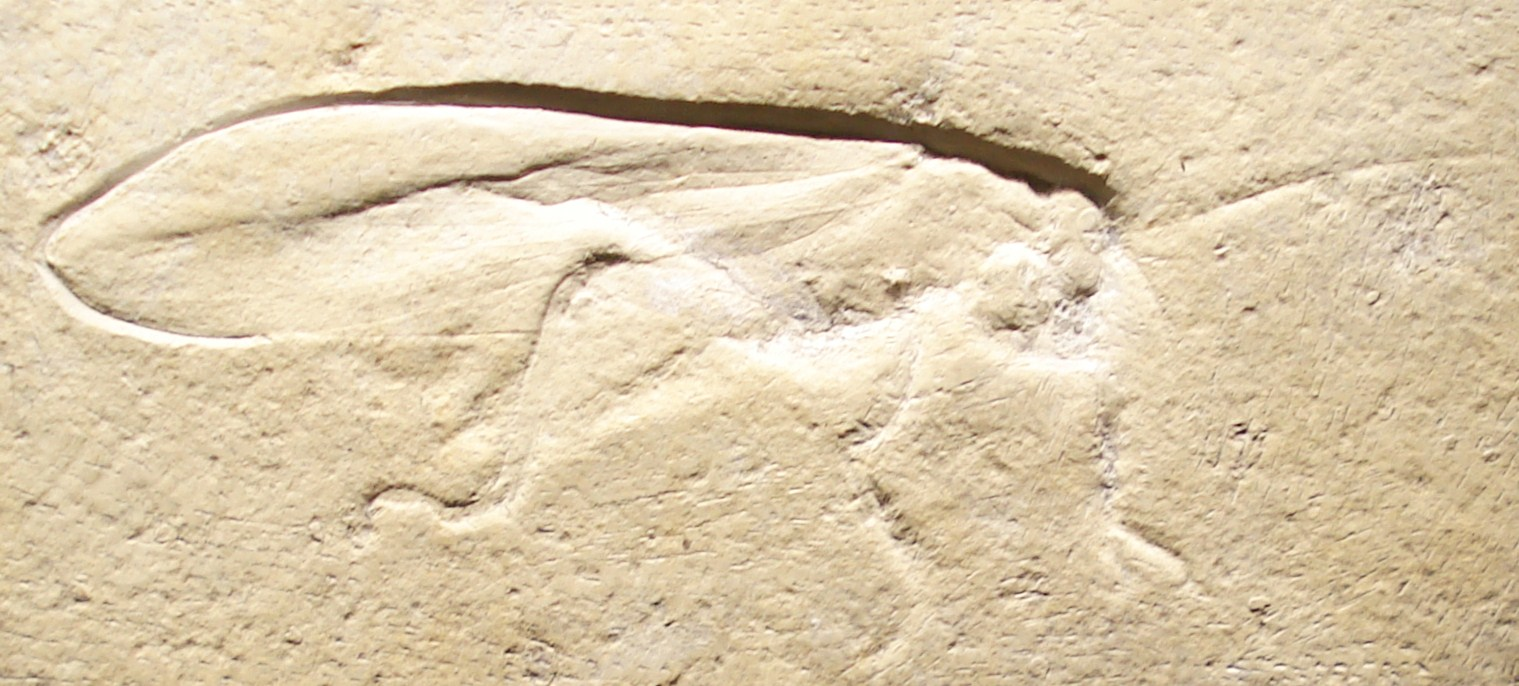
Prophalangopsidae: Jurassic fossil Pycnophlebia speciosa

Fossil Ensifera are found from the late Carboniferous period onwards. The oldest known fossil in the Archaeorthoptera, the crown group of the Orthoptera, and also the oldest member of the Pterygota (winged insects), is from the Namurian (324 mya) Lower Carboniferous beds in the Upper Silesian Basin of the Czech Republic.

=== Phylogeny ===
The phylogenetic relationships of the Ensifera from Zhou et al 2017 are shown in the following cladogram, with the Orthoptera divided into two main groups, Ensifera and Caelifera (grasshoppers).

- Orthoptera
  - Ensifera
    - - Schizodactyloidea (dune crickets)
      - - Gryllotalpoidea (mole crickets)
        - Grylloidea (crickets)
    - - Rhaphidophoroidea (cave weta, cave crickets)
      - - Stenopelmatoidea (weta, king crickets)
        - - Hagloidea (grigs, etc)
          - Tettigoniidea
            - Phaneropteridae (leaf katydids)
            - Tettigoniidae (katydids, bush crickets)
  - Caelifera
    (grasshoppers, groundhoppers, pygmy mole crickets)
