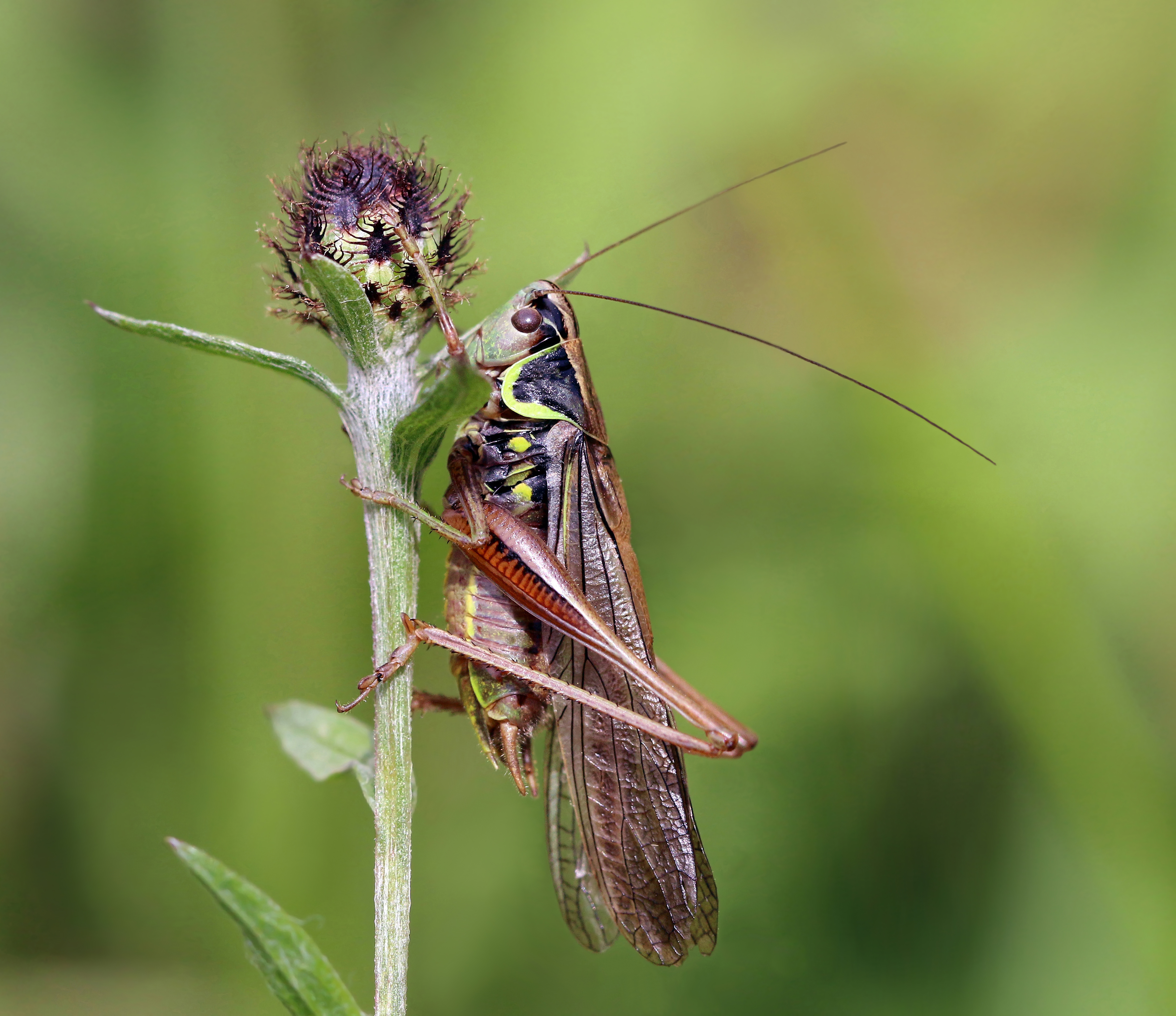
- Roesel's bush-cricket family Tettigoniidae

Scientific classification
- Kingdom: Animalia
- Phylum: Arthropoda
- Clade: Pancrustacea
- Class: Insecta
- Infraclass: Neoptera
- Cohort: Polyneoptera
- Order: Orthoptera; Latreille, 1793

Extant suborders and superfamilies
- Suborder Ensifera: Grylloidea; Gryllotalpoidea; Hagloidea; Rhaphidophoroidea; Schizodactyloidea; Stenopelmatoidea; Tettigonioidea; Suborder Caelifera: Acridoidea; Eumastacoidea; Pneumoroidea; Pyrgomorphoidea; Tanaoceroidea; Tetrigoidea; Tridactyloidea; Trigonopterygoidea

= Orthoptera =

Orthoptera Temporal range: Carboniferous–recent 300–0 Ma

Order of insects that includes grasshoppers

Orthoptera (from Ancient Greek ὀρθός (orthós) 'straight' and πτερά (pterá) 'wings') is an order of insects that comprises the grasshoppers, locusts, and crickets, including closely related insects, such as the bush crickets or katydids and wētā. The order is subdivided into two suborders: Caelifera – grasshoppers, locusts, and close relatives; and Ensifera – crickets and close relatives.

More than 20,000 species are distributed worldwide. The insects in the order have incomplete metamorphosis, and produce sound (known as a "stridulation") by rubbing their wings against each other or their legs, the wings or legs containing rows of corrugated bumps. The tympanum, or ear, is located in the front tibia in crickets, mole crickets, and bush crickets or katydids, and on the first abdominal segment in the grasshoppers and locusts. These organisms use vibrations to locate other individuals.

Grasshoppers and other orthopterans are able to fold their wings (i.e. they are members of Neoptera).

== Etymology ==
The name is derived from the Greek ὀρθός orthos meaning "straight" and πτερόν pteron meaning "wing".

== Characteristics ==
Orthopterans have a generally cylindrical body, with elongated hindlegs and musculature adapted for jumping. They have mandibulate mouthparts for biting and chewing and large compound eyes, and may or may not have ocelli, depending on the species. The antennae have multiple joints and filiform type, and are of variable length.

The first and third segments on the thorax are larger, while the second segment is much smaller. They have two pairs of wings, which are held overlapping the abdomen at rest. The forewings, or tegmina, are narrower than the hindwings and hardened at the base, while the hindwings are membranous, with straight veins and numerous cross-veins. At rest, the hindwings are held folded fan-like under the forewings. The final two to three segments of the abdomen are reduced, and have single-segmented cerci.

== Life cycle ==
Orthopterans have a paurometabolous lifecycle or incomplete metamorphosis. The use of sound is generally crucial in courtship, and most species have distinct songs. Most grasshoppers lay their eggs in the ground or on vegetation. The eggs hatch and the young nymphs resemble adults, but lack wings and at this stage are often called 'hoppers'. They may often also have a radically different coloration from the adults. Through successive moults, the nymphs develop wings until their final moult into a mature adult with fully developed wings.

The number of moults varies between species; growth is also very variable and may take a few weeks to some months depending on food availability and weather conditions.

== Evolution ==
This order evolved 300 million years ago with a division into two suborders – Caelifera and Ensifera – occurring 256 million years ago.

=== Phylogeny ===
The Orthoptera are divided into two suborders, Caelifera and Ensifera, that have been shown to be monophyletic. A recent comprehensive phylogeny based on analyses of data from transcriptomes and mitochondrial genomes found the following relationships within Orthoptera.

- Orthoptera
  - Ensifera
    - Gryllidea
      - Gryllotalpoidea (Note: Gryllotalpoidea is paraphyletic with respect to Grylloidea, with either Gryllotalpidae or Myrmecophilidae as sister to Grylloidea) (mole crickets and ant crickets)
      - Grylloidea ("true crickets", scaly crickets, wood crickets, etc)
    - Tettigoniidea
      - Rhaphidophoroidea (cave crickets, camel crickets, spider crickets and sand treaders)
      - - Schizodactyloidea (dune crickets)
        - - Stenopelmatoidea (Jerusalem crickets, king crickets, leaf-rolling crickets and Cooloola monsters)
          - - Hagloidea (grigs)
            - Tettigonioidea (katydids or bush crickets)
  - Caelifera
    - Tridactylidea
      Tridactyloidea
    - Acrididea
      - Tetrigoidea
      - Acridomorpha (grasshoppers)
        - - Eumastacoidea (Note: Eumastacoidea is paraphyletic with respect to Proscopioidea, with the latter in a derived position as sister to Episactidae.)
          - Proscopioidea
        - - Tanaoceroidea
          - - - Trigonopterygoidea (Note: Trigonopterygoidea is paraphyletic with respect to Pneumoroidea, with Trigonopterygidae as sister to Pneumoridae.)
              - Pneumoroidea
            - - Pyrgomorphoidea
              - Acridoidea

=== Taxonomy ===
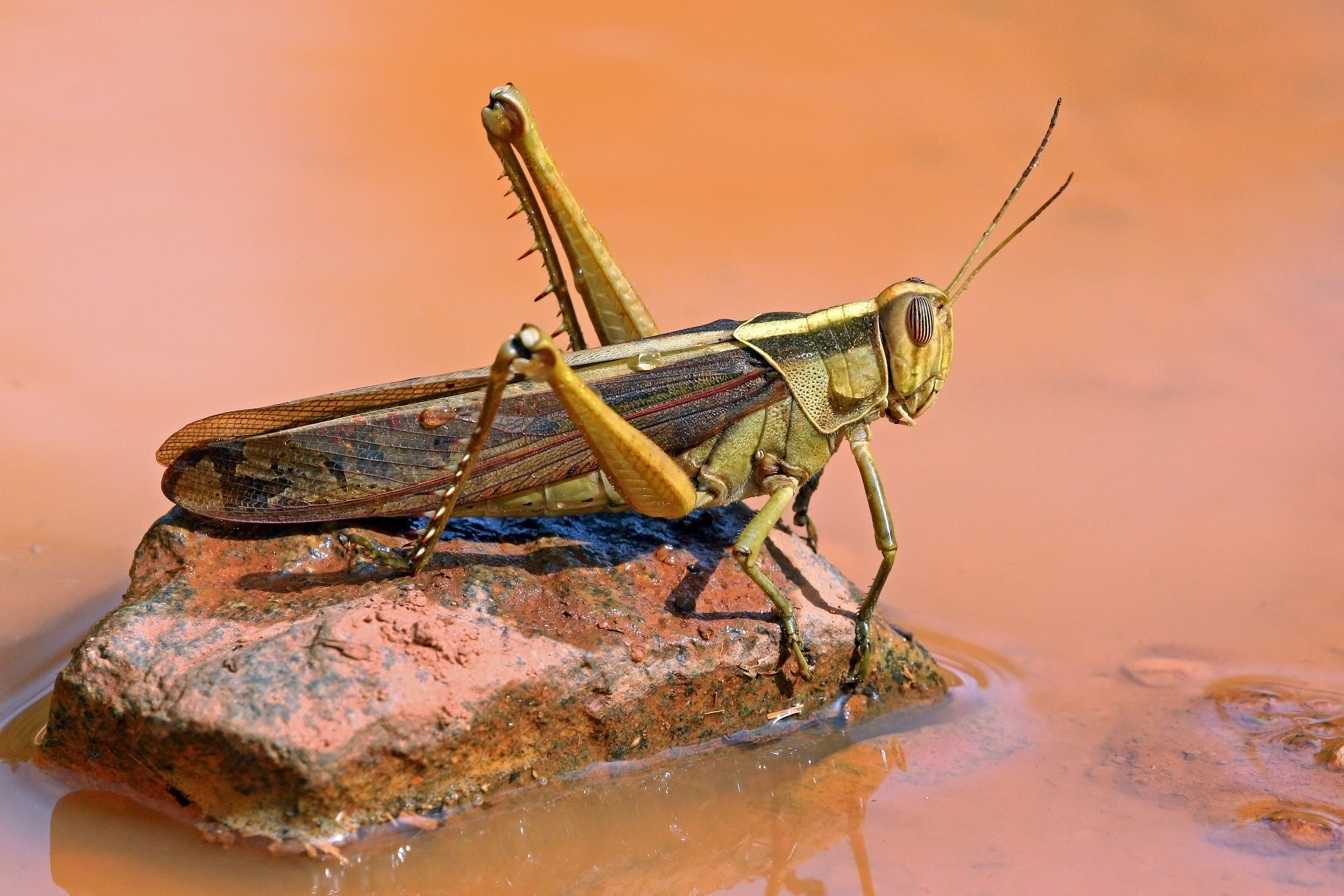
Garden locust (Acanthacris ruficornis), Ghana, family Acrididae

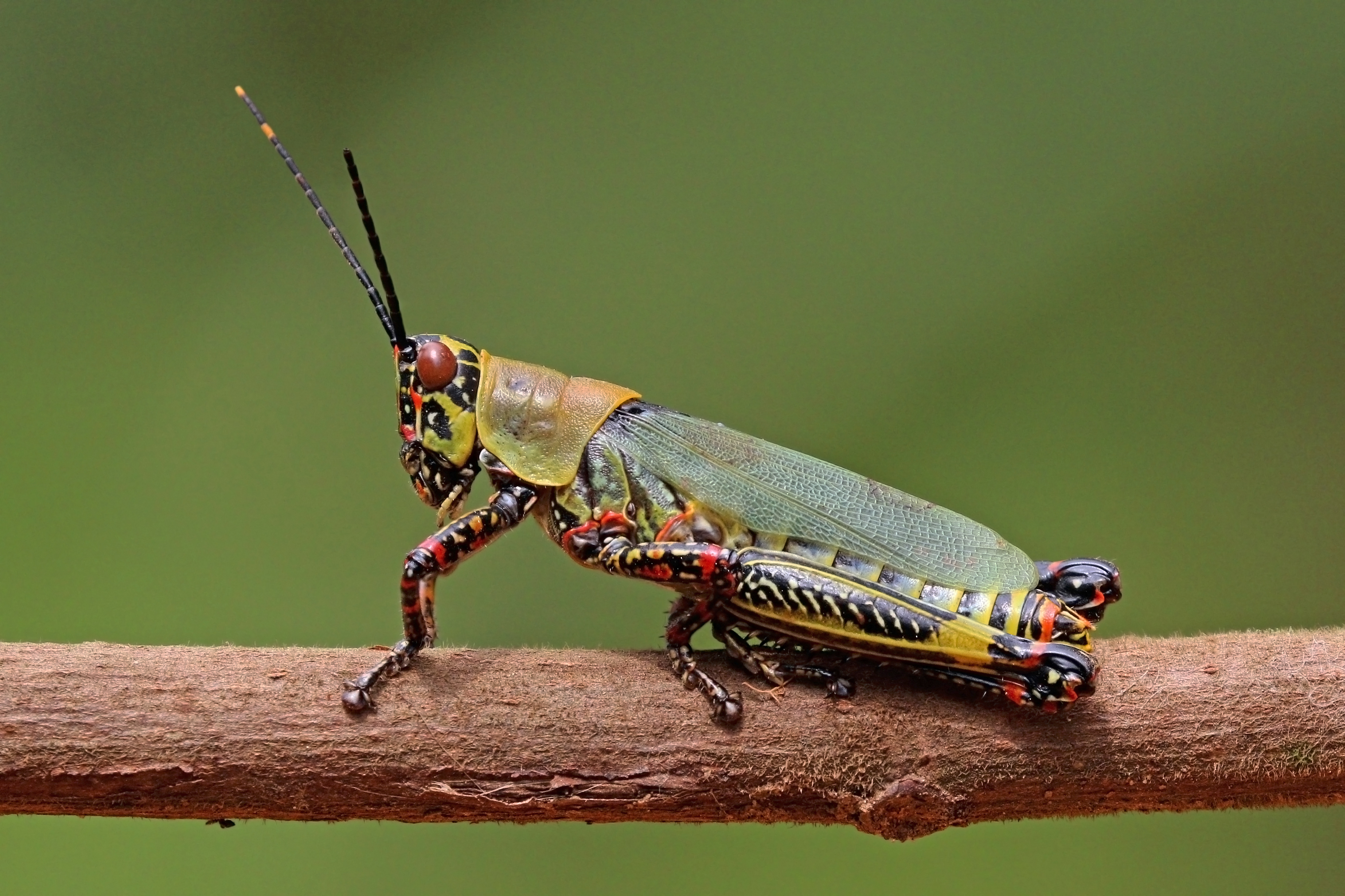
Variegated grasshopper (Zonocerus variegatus), Ghana, family Pyrgomorphidae

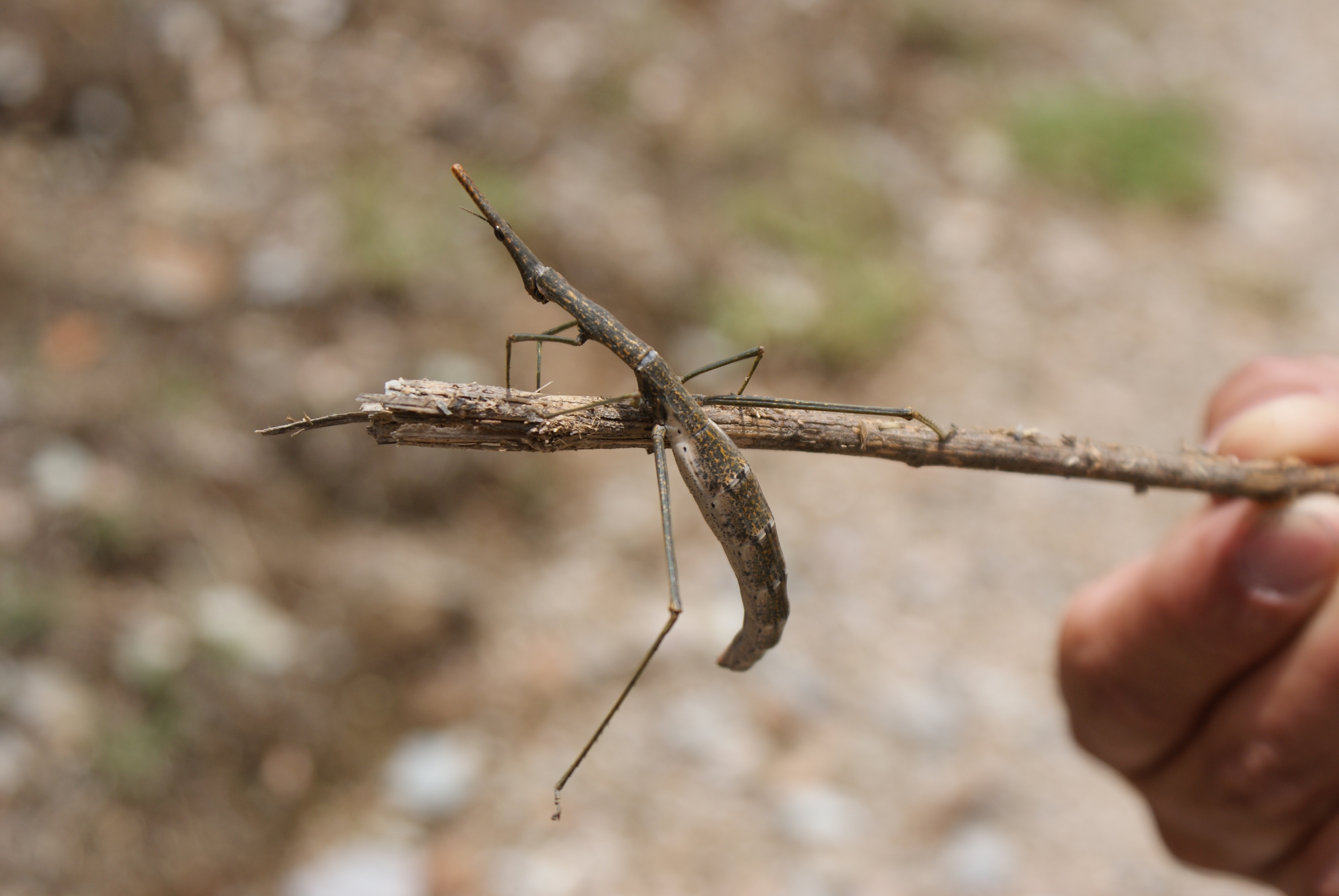
Proscopiidae gen. sp. from the Andes of Peru

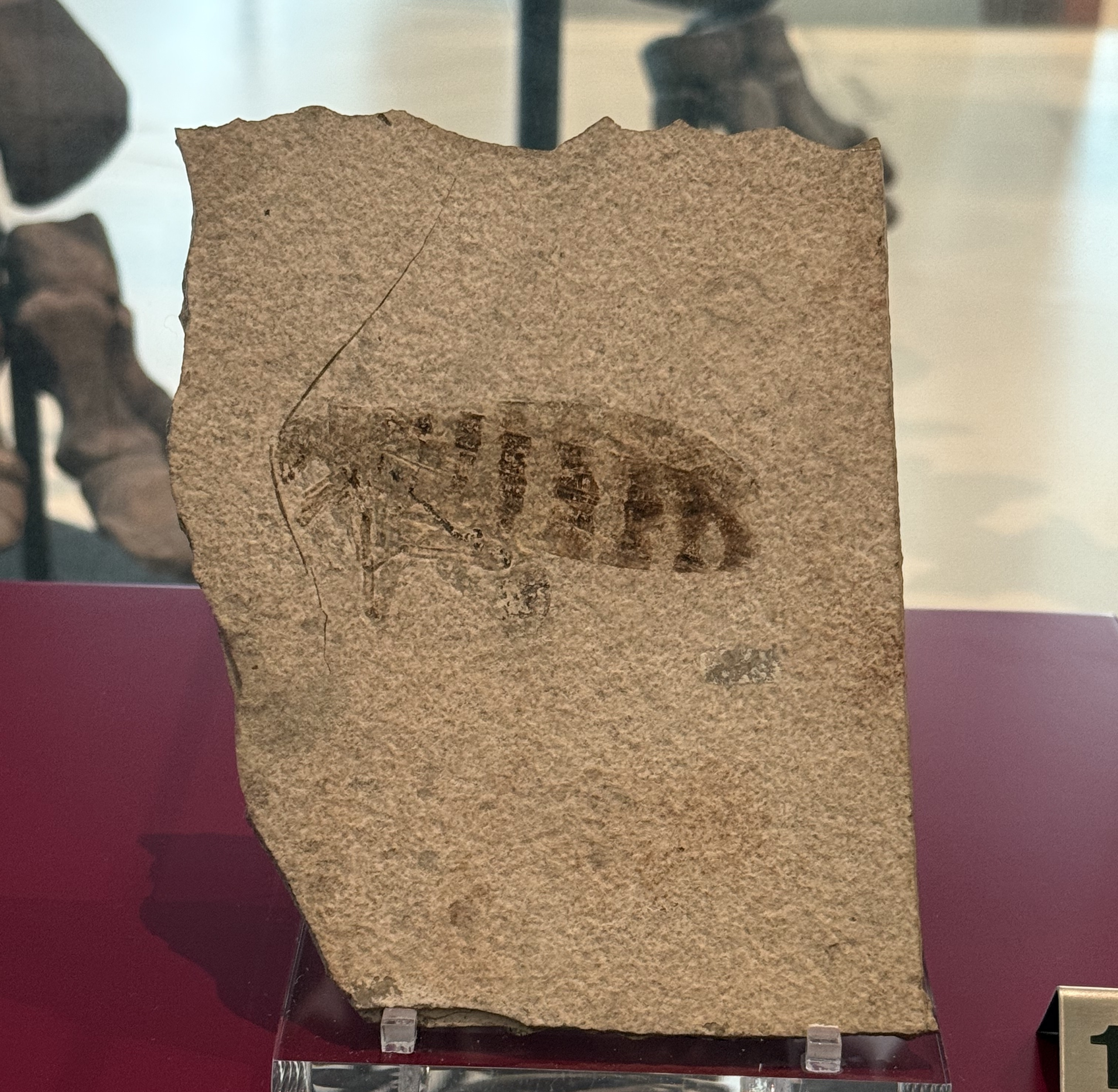
†Aboilus aulietus from Kazakhstan (Late Jurassic)

Taxonomists classify members of the Caelifera and Ensifera into infraorders and superfamilies as follows:

- Suborder Caelifera – grasshoppers, pygmy mole crickets and allies
  - Infraorder Acrididea
    - Superfamily Acridoidea – grasshoppers, locusts
    - Superfamily Eumastacoidea – monkey or matchstick grasshoppers and allies
    - Superfamily Locustopsoidea†
    - Superfamily Pneumoroidea – bladder grasshoppers
    - Superfamily Pyrgomorphoidea – gaudy grasshoppers
    - Superfamily Tanaoceroidea – desert long-horned grasshoppers
    - Superfamily Tetrigoidea – ground-hoppers or grouse locusts
    - Superfamily Trigonopterygoidea – leaf grasshoppers
  - Infraorder Tridactylidea
    - Superfamily Dzhajloutshelloidea†
    - Superfamily Regiatoidea†
    - Superfamily Tridactyloidea – pygmy mole crickets and allies
- Suborder Ensifera – crickets
  - Superfamily Grylloidea – crickets
  - Superfamily Gryllotalpoidea – mole crickets and ant crickets
  - Superfamily Hagloidea – grigs and allies
  - Superfamily Phasmomimoidea†
  - Superfamily Rhaphidophoroidea – camel crickets, cave crickets, cave wētā
  - Superfamily Schizodactyloidea – dune crickets
  - Superfamily Stenopelmatoidea – wētā and allies
  - Superfamily Tettigonioidea – katydids / bush crickets
- Incertae sedis
  - Superfamily Elcanoidea† Permian-Paleocene

== Relationships with humans ==
=== As pests ===
Several species of Orthoptera are considered pests of crops and rangelands or seeking warmth in homes by humans. The two groups of Orthoptera that cause the most damage are grasshoppers and locusts. Locusts are historically known for wiping out fields of crops in a day. Locusts have the ability to eat up to their own body weight in a single day. Individuals gather in large groups called swarms, consisting of up to 80 million individuals and spanning as much as 460 square miles. Grasshoppers can cause major agricultural damage but not to the documented extent as locusts historically have. These insects mainly feed on weeds and grasses, however, during times of drought and high population density they will feed on crops. They are a known pest in soybean fields and will likely feed on these crops once preferred food sources have become scarce.

=== As food ===
Most orthopterans are edible, making up 13% of all insects including some 80 species of grasshoppers being regularly consumed worldwide. In Madagascar and Oaxaca, grasshoppers and locusts are usually collected early in the morning when it is cooler as the orthopterans are less mobile due to being cold-blooded. In Thailand, house crickets are commonly reared and eaten; as of 2012, around 20,000 cricket farmers had farms in 53 of their 76 provinces.

In the second century BCE in Ancient Greece, Diodorus Siculus is known to have called people from Ethiopia Acridophagi, meaning "eaters of locusts."

In Judaism, the Orthoptera include the only insects considered kosher. The list of dietary laws in the book of Leviticus forbids all flying insects that walk, but makes an exception for certain locusts. The Torah states the only kosher flying insects with four walking legs have knees that extend above their feet so that they hop.

=== As creators of biofuel ===
With new research showing promise in locating alternative biofuel sources in the gut of insects, grasshoppers are one species of interest. The insect's ability to break down cellulose and lignin without producing greenhouse gases has aroused scientific interest.

== See also ==
- List of Orthopteroid genera containing species recorded in Europe
- List of Orthoptera recorded in Britain
- Orthopterida
- Female sperm storage
