= Ammopelmatus cahuilaensis =

Conservation status
- Vulnerable (IUCN 2.3)

Scientific classification
- Kingdom: Animalia
- Phylum: Arthropoda
- Clade: Pancrustacea
- Class: Insecta
- Order: Orthoptera
- Suborder: Ensifera
- Family: Stenopelmatidae
- Genus: Ammopelmatus
- Species: A. cahuilaensis

Binomial name
- Ammopelmatus cahuilaensis (Tinkham, 1968)

Synonyms
- Stenopelmatus cahuilaensis Tinkham, 1968; Stenopelmatus coahuilensis Otte, 2000 (missp.); Stenopelmatus cahuilensis Weissman, 2001 (missp.)

Species of cricket-like animal

Ammopelmatus cahuilaensis (commonly known as the Coachella Valley Jerusalem cricket) is a species of insect in the family Stenopelmatidae. The species is found in the Coachella Valley and was described by Ernest R. Tinkham in 1968, in The Great Basin Naturalist.

== Type specimen ==
The holotype specimen, a male, is at the California Academy of Sciences. According to Tinkham, the species can be distinguished from other Jerusalem crickets as follows: Foretibiae bearing only two ventral apical spurs immediately posterioradly of the third and fourth calcars. Caudal tibiae with three dorsal apical or subapical teeth on each margin.

== Range and habitat ==
It is endemic to the United States, specifically the Coachella Valley of California. It has been found from the Snow Creek to the sand dune areas surrounding the Palm Springs airport. Its preference is for sandy to somewhat gravelly soil and is considered a sand obligate species. The species is found associated with the roots of local sunflower species, Ambrosia sp. and Encelia sp.

Despite the arid environments where they are found, they prefer high humidity and are most commonly observed following winter or spring rainstorms beneath surface debris. During the hot and dry summer, they pass daylight hours in deep burrows, only occasionally being found on the surface at night. Their preference for the western edge of the valley, which is cooler and moister than the eastern part, may mean that they have a highly restricted range.

Their food preference is for tubers, roots, and various plant detritus, but have also been observed consuming dead animals and are occasionally cannibalistic. The females lay small clusters of large eggs in soil pockets. Their lifecycle may extend for three or more years.
