= Ammopelmatus kelsoensis =

Conservation status
- Vulnerable (IUCN 2.3)

Scientific classification
- Kingdom: Animalia
- Phylum: Arthropoda
- Class: Insecta
- Order: Orthoptera
- Suborder: Ensifera
- Family: Stenopelmatidae
- Genus: Ammopelmatus
- Species: A. kelsoensis

Binomial name
- Ammopelmatus kelsoensis Tinkham, 1965

Species of cricket-like animal

Ammopelmatus kelsoensis, commonly known as the Kelso Jerusalem cricket, is a species of insect in the family Stenopelmatidae. It is endemic to the Kelso Dunes in the United States.

== Description ==
Jerusalem crickets are large, striking orthopteran insects. The genus Ammopelmatus differs from other genera of stenopelmatine crickets in the following characters:

- Having vestigial or absent tibial spines on the apical dorsal margins of the caudal tibiae
- Median or presubapical spur on the ventral surface of the foretibiae absent

=== Diagnostic characteristics ===
Leg characters, such as the form of spines and spurs, are important for differentiating species in this genus. A. kelsoensis has short, spatulate apical tibial spurs and calcars. The fore tibia has only two small ventral spines, and the hind tibia has only one ventral one. Ammopelmatus muwu can be distinguished from A. kelsoensis by the curved apical spur on the internal margin of the fore tibia, the hind tibia with the first tooth on the internal margin, and first major tooth on the external margin of the hind tibia short and blunt. John and Rentz (1987) studied the chromosomes of this species.

== Behavior and ecology ==
All three known specimens were collected in a burrow of a Rhachocnemis colony. One specimen was feeding on a small Rhacocnemis nymph. Little is known about their lifecycle, but adults were collected in midsummer. The short, robust legs, with their reduced spines and spurs, are well-adapted for an arenicolous, or burrow-dwelling existence.
