= Ammopelmatus longispina =

Scientific classification
- Domain: Eukaryota
- Kingdom: Animalia
- Phylum: Arthropoda
- Class: Insecta
- Order: Orthoptera
- Suborder: Ensifera
- Family: Stenopelmatidae
- Genus: Ammopelmatus
- Species: A. longispina

Binomial name
- Ammopelmatus longispina (Brunner von Wattenwyl, 1888)

Synonyms
- Stenopelmatus longispina Brunner von Wattenwyl, 1888; Ammopelmatus longispinus Weissman et al. 2021 (misspelling)

Species of cricket-like animal

Ammopelmatus longispina is a species of Jerusalem cricket in the family Stenopelmatidae. It is found in North America.
