= Ammopelmatus pictus =

Scientific classification
- Domain: Eukaryota
- Kingdom: Animalia
- Phylum: Arthropoda
- Class: Insecta
- Order: Orthoptera
- Suborder: Ensifera
- Family: Stenopelmatidae
- Genus: Ammopelmatus
- Species: A. pictus

Binomial name
- Ammopelmatus pictus (Scudder, 1899)

Species of cricket-like animal

Ammopelmatus pictus, commonly known as Pictured Jerusalem Cricket, is a species of Jerusalem cricket in the family Stenopelmatidae. It is found in parts of the Central Valley, Diablo Range, and Silicon Valley within California.
