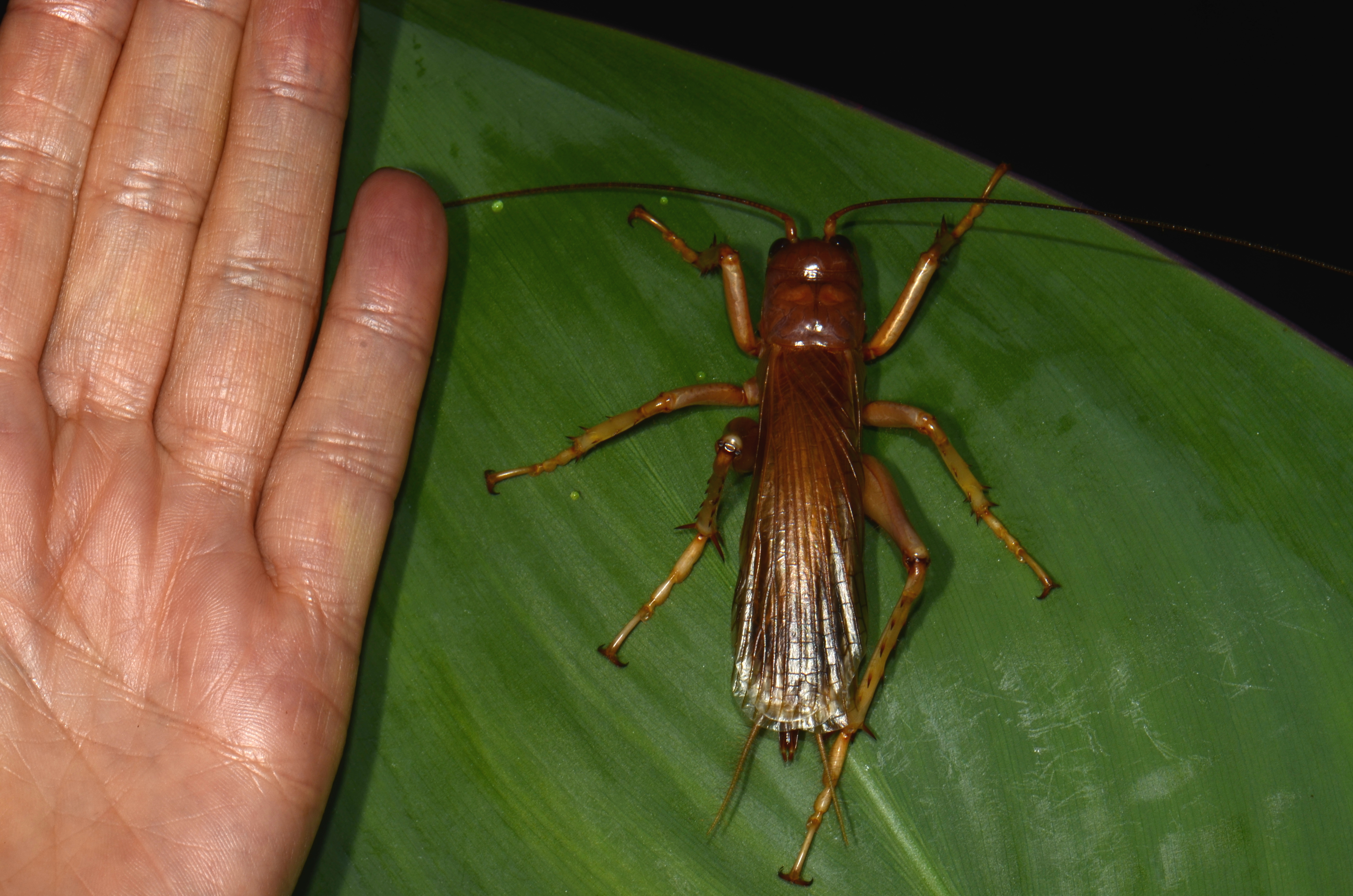

Scientific classification
- Kingdom: Animalia
- Phylum: Arthropoda
- Clade: Pancrustacea
- Class: Insecta
- Order: Orthoptera
- Suborder: Ensifera
- Family: Stenopelmatidae
- Genus: Sia
- Species: S. ferox

Binomial name
- Sia ferox Giebel, 1861

Synonyms
- Anostostoma couloni Saussure, 1862; Sia couloni (Saussure, 1862)

= Sia ferox =

Species of cricket-like animal

Sia ferox (also known as Riokku (リオック, loanword from the Indonesian name) or Obakekorogisu (オバケコロギス, "Obake raspy cricket") in Japan) is a species of cricket that lives in Indonesia. It belongs to the family Stenopelmatidae and the genus Sia.

== Appearance ==
The length is 65–80 millimetres (2.6–3.1 in). Although its basic form is similar to other Stenopelmatoidea, it is relatively elongated. Its body-color is brown. The female has a rudimentary ovipositor, unlike true Gryllacrididae or Anostostomatidae species. It is similar to Jerusalem crickets, but it is the only species of Stenopelmatidae that lives in Indonesia, and the related species Sia incisa occurs in Malaysia.

== Ecology ==
The species is a nocturnal predatory cricket that presumably preys on other small organisms found in the rainforest litter such as other arthropods including spiders, smaller crickets and grasshoppers. Like other Stenopelmatidae species, Sia ferox usually hides in its burrow during the day. At night, it comes out from its burrow and searches for prey. The detailed ecology of S. ferox is not known due to insufficient research.
