= Ammopelmatus mescaleroensis =

Scientific classification
- Domain: Eukaryota
- Kingdom: Animalia
- Phylum: Arthropoda
- Class: Insecta
- Order: Orthoptera
- Suborder: Ensifera
- Family: Stenopelmatidae
- Genus: Ammopelmatus
- Species: A. mescaleroensis

Binomial name
- Ammopelmatus mescaleroensis (Tinkham, 1979)

Species of cricket-like animal

Ammopelmatus mescaleroensis is a species of Jerusalem cricket in the family Stenopelmatidae. It is found in the area around Mescalero, in the United States state of New Mexico.
