= Ammopelmatus navajo =

Conservation status
- Vulnerable (IUCN 2.3)

Scientific classification
- Kingdom: Animalia
- Phylum: Arthropoda
- Class: Insecta
- Order: Orthoptera
- Suborder: Ensifera
- Family: Stenopelmatidae
- Genus: Ammopelmatus
- Species: A. navajo

Binomial name
- Ammopelmatus navajo (Rentz, 1978)

Synonyms
- Stenopelmatus navajo Rentz, 1978

Species of cricket-like animal

Ammopelmatus navajo, commonly known as the Navajo Jerusalem cricket, is a species of nocturnal Jerusalem cricket in the family Stenopelmatidae. It is endemic to the United States, specifically Arizona, and found under rocks in loose soil. It is closely related to A. fuscus and they have nearly identical drumming patterns. They live one to two years as adults, but can die prematurely by parasitic infections, commonly by the horsehair worm.

== Description ==
It is very large, compared to others of the same genus, with a pale, sand coloration that provides camouflage in sand dunes. Like all Jerusalem crickets, they are wingless. They use their strong, spiny legs to burrow rapidly when disturbed. This species has a wide head and powerful jaws that deliver painful, but non-venomous bites.
