= Oryctopterus =

Scientific classification
- Domain: Eukaryota
- Kingdom: Animalia
- Phylum: Arthropoda
- Class: Insecta
- Order: Orthoptera
- Suborder: Ensifera
- Family: Stenopelmatidae
- Subfamily: Stenopelmatinae
- Tribe: Oryctopterini; Gorochov, 1988
- Genus: Oryctopterus; Karny, 1937

Genus of cricket-like animals

Oryctopterus is a genus of Orthopteran insects in the subfamily Stenopelmatinae and is the only genus in the tribe Oryctopterini. Species have been recorded from India and Sri Lanka.

== Species ==
The Orthoptera Species File lists:

1. Oryctopterus lagenipes (Karny, 1935) - type species (as Oryctopus lagenipes Karny, locality Sri Lanka)
2. Oryctopterus varuna Hiremath & Prathapan, 2021
3. Oryctopterus yeshwanthi Hiremath & Prathapan, 2021
