= Maxentius (disambiguation) =

Maxentius (c. 283 – 312) was a Roman emperor.

Maxentius may also refer to:

== People ==
- Saint Maxentius (c. 445 – c. 515), a French saint
- Maxentius of Aquileia (died 837), a patriarch of Aquileia
- Joannes Maxentius (6th century), a Byzantine leader of the so-called Scythian monks

== Other uses ==
- Maxentius (insect), a genus of cricket-like insect in the family Stenopelmatidae

== See also ==
- Maxentia (disambiguation)
- Basilica of Maxentius
- Circus of Maxentius
- Mausoleum of Maxentius
- Villa of Maxentius
