= Maxentia =

Maxentia may refer to:

- Maxentia of Beauvais, 5th-century martyr
- Maxentia, the mother of Vigilius of Trent
- Castra Maxentia
- Maxentia, a given name or religious name notably borne by
  - Maxentia Rheinberger (1832–1917), Liechtensteiner nun

== See also ==
- Maxentius (disambiguation)
