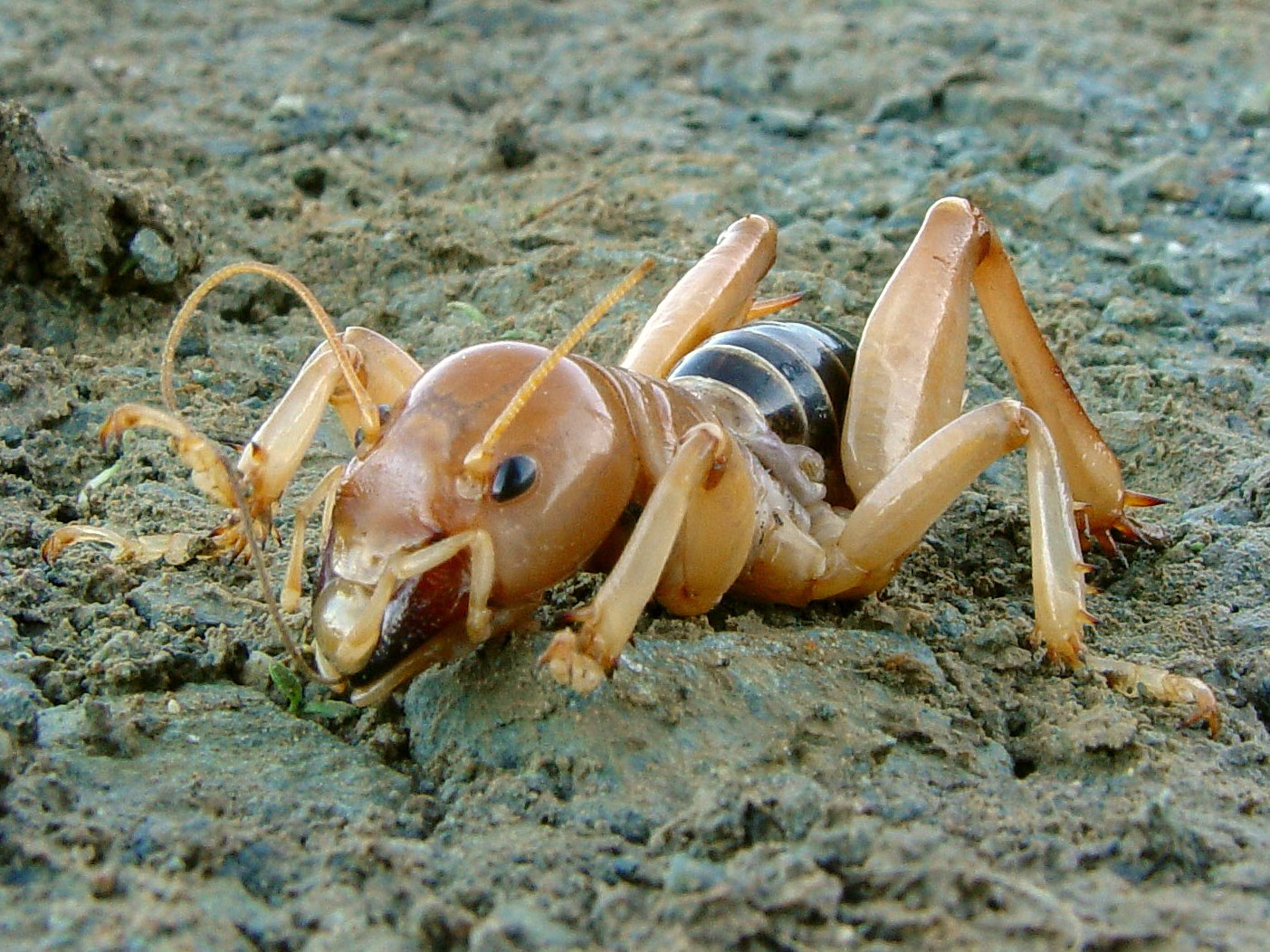
- Ammopelmatus fuscus

Scientific classification
- Kingdom: Animalia
- Phylum: Arthropoda
- Clade: Pancrustacea
- Class: Insecta
- Order: Orthoptera
- Suborder: Ensifera
- Family: Stenopelmatidae
- Subfamily: Stenopelmatinae
- Tribe: Stenopelmatini
- Genus: Ammopelmatus; Tinkham, 1965

Synonyms
- Viscainopelmatus Tinkham, 1970

= Ammopelmatus =

Genus of cricket-like animals

Ammopelmatus (Note: From the Greek ammos "sand" and pelma "sole of foot" (GEN pelmatos).) is a genus of insects in the family Stenopelmatidae, one of two genera of large, flightless insects referred to commonly as Jerusalem crickets (or "potato bugs"). They are native to Western United States and northwestern Mexico.

== Classification ==
Twenty species are recognized as valid in the genus Ammopelmatus, as presently recognized; 17 of these species were formerly placed in the genus Stenopelmatus. The family Stenopelmatidae contains several Old World genera, but only the genera in the subfamily Stenopelmatinae (all New World) are referred to as Jerusalem crickets.

=== Species ===
- Ammopelmatus cahuilaensis
- Ammopelmatus californicus
- Ammopelmatus cephalotes
- Ammopelmatus comanchus
- Ammopelmatus davewerneri
- Ammopelmatus fasciatus
- Ammopelmatus fuscus
- Ammopelmatus hydrocephalus
- Ammopelmatus intermedius
- Ammopelmatus irregularis
- Ammopelmatus juniperdunes (Juniper Dunes Jerusalem Cricket)
- Ammopelmatus kelsoensis
- Ammopelmatus longispina
- Ammopelmatus mescaleroensis
- Ammopelmatus monahansensis
- Ammopelmatus muwu (Point Conception Jerusalem Cricket)
- Ammopelmatus navajo
- Ammopelmatus nigrocapitatus
- Ammopelmatus oculatus
- Ammopelmatus pictus
- Ammopelmatus terrenus
