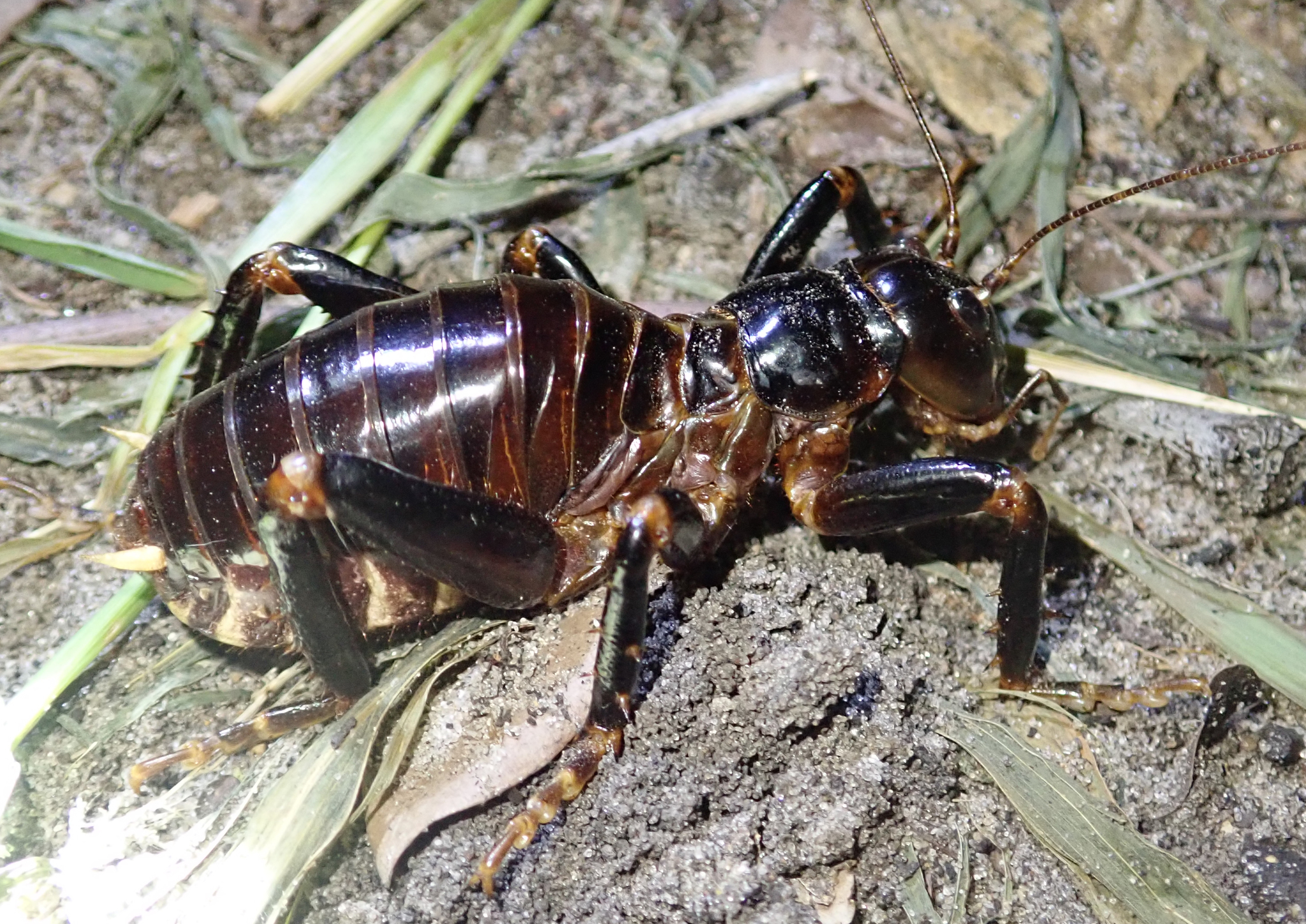
- Maxentius pinguis, sand cricket, Botswana

Scientific classification
- Kingdom: Animalia
- Phylum: Arthropoda
- Class: Insecta
- Order: Orthoptera
- Suborder: Ensifera
- Family: Stenopelmatidae
- Subfamily: Stenopelmatinae; Burmeister, 1838

Tribes
- Maxentiini Gorochov, 2021; Oryctopini Kevan, 1986; Oryctopterini Gorochov, 1988; Siini Gorochov, 1988; Stenopelmatini Burmeister, 1838

= Stenopelmatinae =

Subfamily of insects

Stenopelmatinae is the sole subfamily in the family Stenopelmatidae. There are about 7 genera and more than 50 described species in Stenopelmatinae.

The species of this subfamily found in the New World are called Jerusalem crickets, making up the genera Ammopelmatus and Stenopelmatus. These were formerly the only genera of this subfamily, and now make up the tribe Stenopelmatini. Old World species have also been referred to as Jerusalem crickets in recent years, as well as sand crickets and stone crickets.

== Tribes and genera ==
The Orthoptera Species File lists five tribes in the subfamily Stenopelmatinae:

=== Monotypic tribes ===
- Maxentius Stål, 1876 (sub-Saharan Africa)
- Oryctopterus Karny, 1937 (India, Sri Lanka)
- Oryctopus Brunner von Wattenwyl, 1888 (India, Sri Lanka)

=== Siini ===
1. † Electrosia Gorochov, 2010 (Baltic amber)
2. Sia Giebel, 1861 (Malaysia, Indonesia)

=== Stenopelmatini ===
1. Ammopelmatus Tinkham, 1965 (North America) - Jerusalem crickets
2. Stenopelmatus Burmeister, 1838 (New World) - Jerusalem crickets
