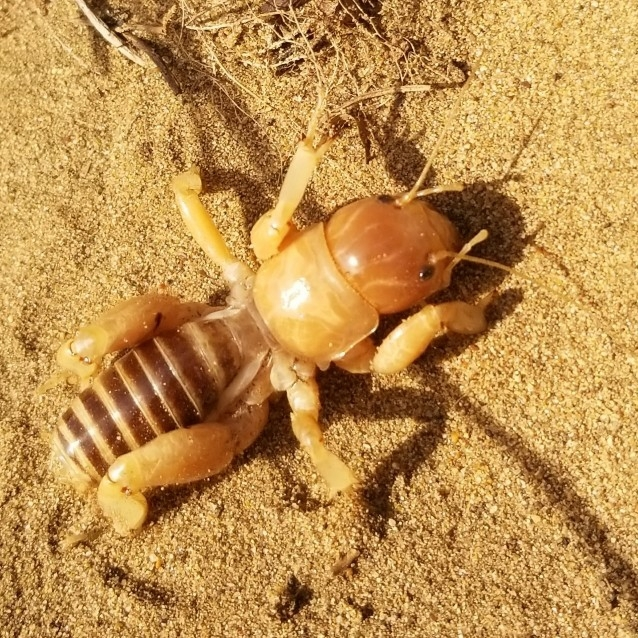

Conservation status
- Vulnerable (IUCN 2.3)

Scientific classification
- Kingdom: Animalia
- Phylum: Arthropoda
- Class: Insecta
- Order: Orthoptera
- Suborder: Ensifera
- Family: Stenopelmatidae
- Genus: Ammopelmatus
- Species: A. muwu

Binomial name
- Ammopelmatus muwu Rentz & Weissman, 1981

= Ammopelmatus muwu =

Species of cricket-like animal

Ammopelmatus muwu is a species of insect in family Stenopelmatidae. It is endemic to parts of San Luis Obispo and Santa Barbara counties in the United States state of California.
