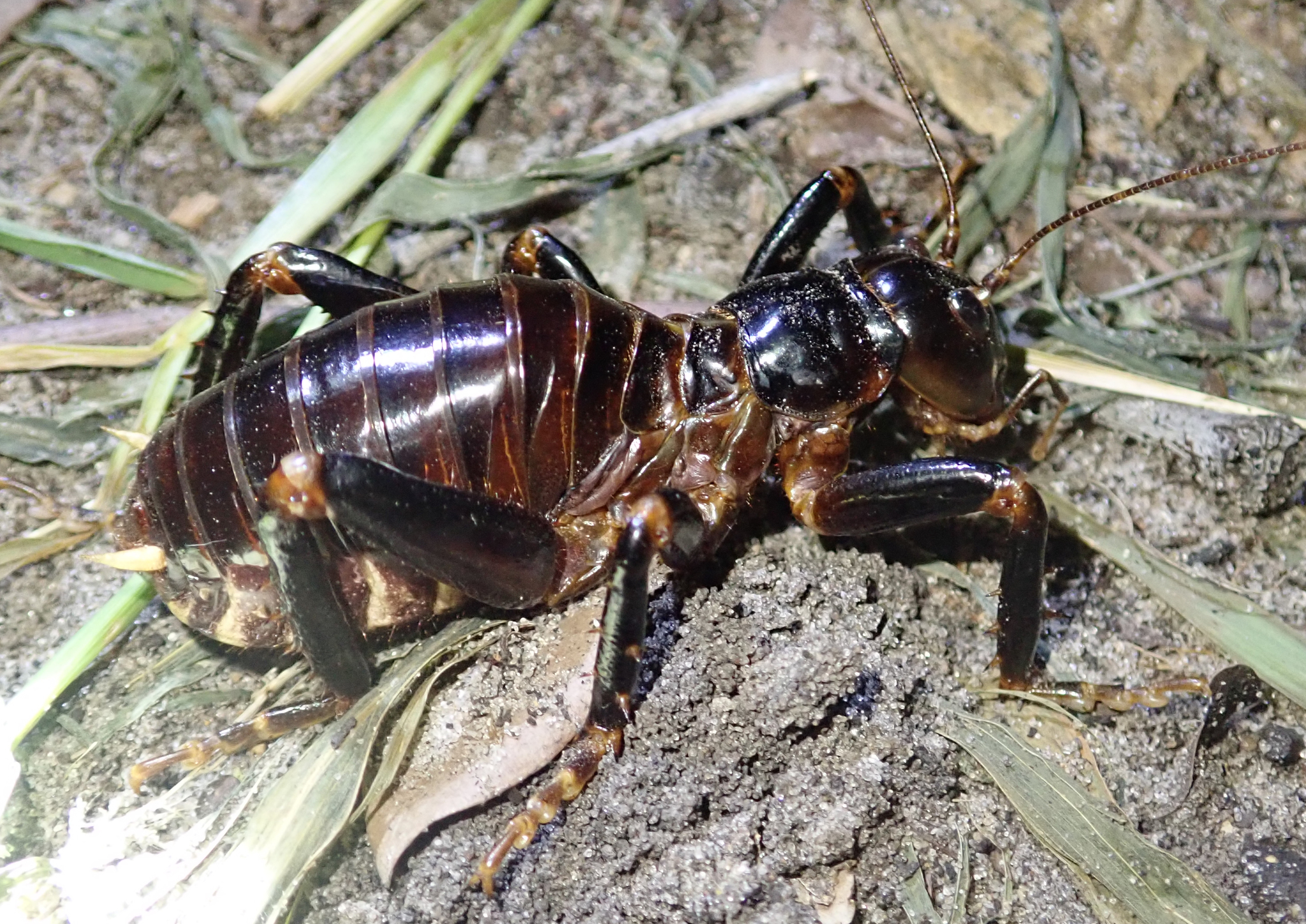
- Maxentius pinguis, sand cricket, Botswana

Scientific classification
- Kingdom: Animalia
- Phylum: Arthropoda
- Clade: Pancrustacea
- Class: Insecta
- Order: Orthoptera
- Suborder: Ensifera
- Family: Stenopelmatidae
- Subfamily: Stenopelmatinae
- Tribe: Maxentiini; Gorochov, 2021
- Genus: Maxentius; Stål, 1876

= Maxentius (insect) =

Genus of cricket-like animals

Maxentius is a genus of insect in the subfamily Stenopelmatinae and formerly treated as a subgenus of the genus Sia. Species can be found in sub-Saharan Africa.

== Species ==
- Maxentius canus (Péringuey, 1916)
- Maxentius kuhlgatzi (Karny, 1910)
- Maxentius pallidus (Walker, 1869)
- Maxentius pinguis (Walker, 1869) — Sand Cricket
