= Macrelcana =

Scientific classification
- Domain: Eukaryota
- Kingdom: Animalia
- Phylum: Arthropoda
- Class: Insecta
- Order: Orthoptera
- Suborder: Ensifera
- Family: Stenopelmatidae
- Genus: †Macrelcana; Karny, 1932
- Species: †M. ungeri

Binomial name
- †Macrelcana ungeri (Heer, 1849)

Synonyms
- Gryllacris ungeri

Extinct genus of insects

Macrelcana ungeri is an extinct orthopteran insect from the Miocene epoch (~12 mya). It belongs to the same family as wetas and potato bugs (Stenopelmatidae).
