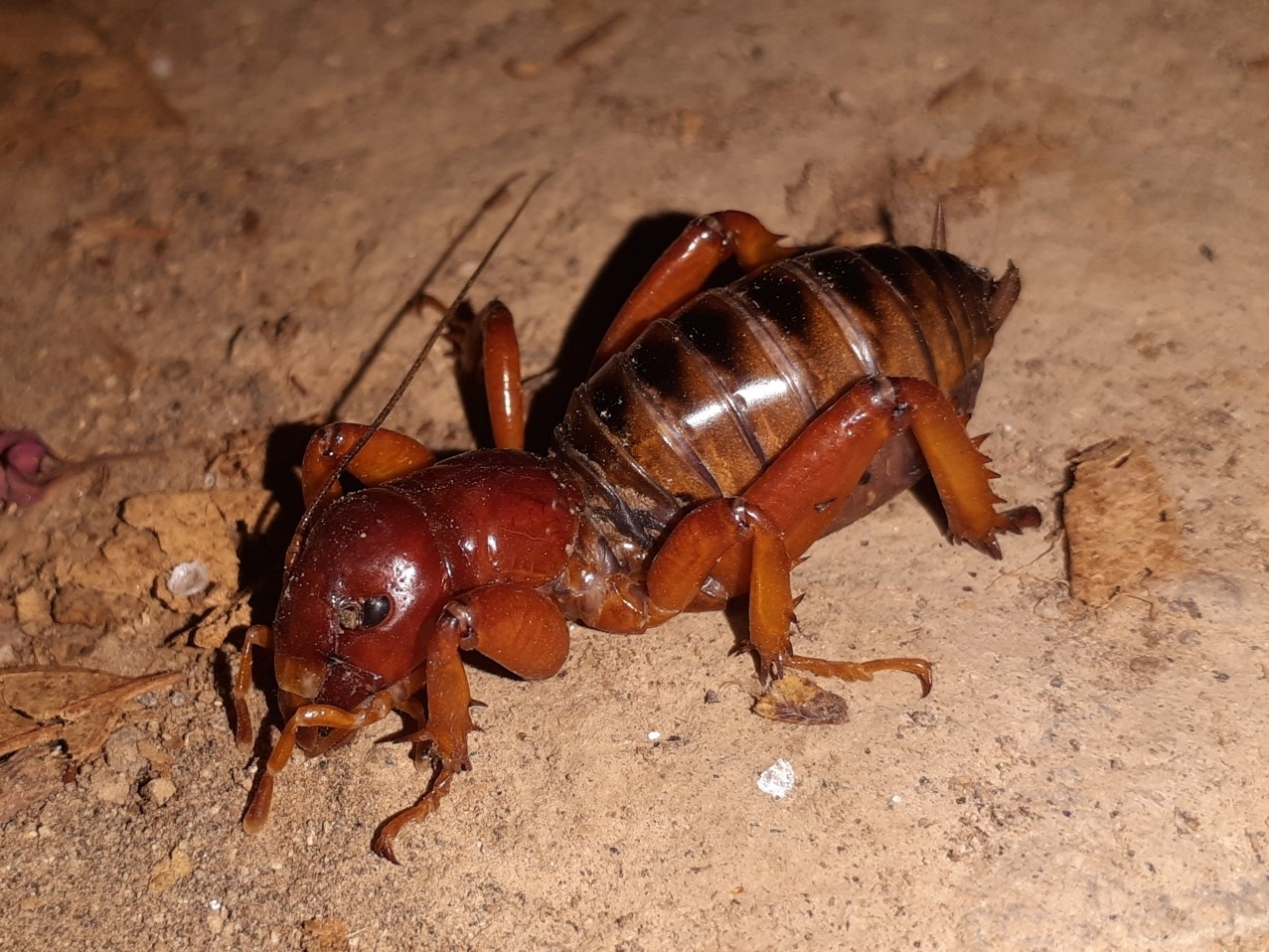
- Stenopelmatus talpa

Scientific classification
- Kingdom: Animalia
- Phylum: Arthropoda
- Class: Insecta
- Order: Orthoptera
- Suborder: Ensifera
- Family: Stenopelmatidae
- Subfamily: Stenopelmatinae
- Tribe: Stenopelmatini
- Genus: Stenopelmatus; Burmeister, 1838

Synonyms
- Stenopelmatopterus Gorochov, 1988

= Stenopelmatus =

Genus of cricket-like animals

Stenopelmatus (Note: From the Greek stenos "narrow" and pelma "sole of foot" (GEN pelmatos).) is one of two genera of large, flightless insects referred to commonly as Jerusalem crickets (or "potato bugs"). They are primarily native to Central America, and one species is known from Ecuador.

== Classification ==
Nineteen species are recognized as valid in the genus Stenopelmatus, as presently recognized (with 13 more of uncertain status and potentially not valid), though the genus was formerly much larger, including most of the species now placed in the genus Ammopelmatus. The family Stenopelmatidae contains several Old World genera, but only the genera in the subfamily Stenopelmatinae (all New World) are referred to as Jerusalem crickets.

=== Valid species ===
- Stenopelmatus ater
- Stenopelmatus chiapas
- Stenopelmatus cusuco
- Stenopelmatus diezmilpies
- Stenopelmatus durango
- Stenopelmatus ecuadorensis
- Stenopelmatus faulkneri
- Stenopelmatus honduras
- Stenopelmatus hondurasito
- Stenopelmatus mineraldelmonte
- Stenopelmatus nuevoleon
- Stenopelmatus perote
- Stenopelmatus piceiventris
- Stenopelmatus saltillo
- Stenopelmatus sanfelipe
- Stenopelmatus sartorianus
- Stenopelmatus talpa
- Stenopelmatus typhlops
- Stenopelmatus zimapan

=== Uncertain status ===
- Stenopelmatus calcaratus
- Stenopelmatus erythromelas
- Stenopelmatus guatemalae
- Stenopelmatus histrio
- Stenopelmatus lessonae
- Stenopelmatus lycosoides
- Stenopelmatus mexicanus
- Stenopelmatus minor
- Stenopelmatus nieti
- Stenopelmatus sallei
- Stenopelmatus sumichrasti
- Stenopelmatus toltecus
- Stenopelmatus vicinus

== Communication ==
Similar to true crickets, each species of Jerusalem cricket produces a different song during mating. This song takes the form of a characteristic drumming in which the insect beats its abdomen against the ground.

No species have wings with sound-producing structures; moreover, evidently none has structures it could use to hear sound. This contrasts with true crickets and katydids, who use their wings to produce sounds and have hearing organs to sense sounds of others. Jerusalem crickets seem unable to hiss by forcing air through their spiracles, as some beetles and cockroaches do. Instead, the few Jerusalem crickets that do make sound rub their hind legs against the sides of the abdomen, producing a rasping, hissing noise. This hiss may serve to deter predators rather than to communicate with other crickets. For such purposes, Jerusalem crickets rely on substrate vibrations felt by subgenual organs located in all six of the insect's legs.

== Size and shape ==
Female Stenopelmatus talpa, also known as the Mexican Jerusalem cricket, are generally larger than males; prothorax width, prothorax length, fore femur, head size, and mandible length, are greater in females than males. However, males tended to have larger hind femora compared to females.
