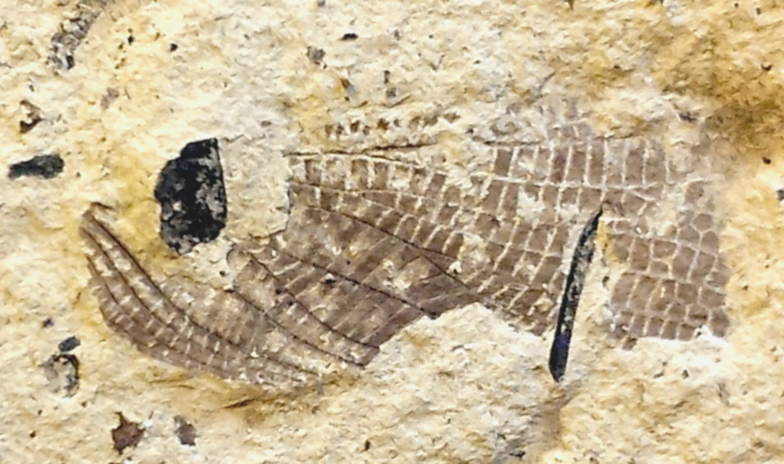
- Paratype 2

Scientific classification
- Kingdom: Animalia
- Phylum: Arthropoda
- Clade: Pancrustacea
- Class: Insecta
- Order: Orthoptera
- Suborder: Ensifera
- Family: †Palaeorehniidae
- Genus: †Republicopteron
- Species: †R. douseae

Binomial name
- †Republicopteron douseae Archibald, Gu, & Mathewes, 2022

= Republicopteron =

Republicopteron Temporal range: Ypresian

Genus of cricket-like animals

Republicopteron is an extinct orthopteran genus in the katydid-like family Palaeorehniidae with a single described species, Republicopteron douseae.

The species is solely known from the Early Eocene sediments exposed in the northeast of the U.S. state of Washington. The family is currently not placed into any orthoptera superfamily, being treated as incertae sedis, and thus the relationship between Republicopteron and the other palaeorehniids with the larger cricket/katydid superfamilies is uncertain. Additionally the possibility that several palaeorehniids may be sister species was left open, and further specimens are needed for resolution of the relationships or synonymies between the genera.

== Distribution ==
Republicopteron douseae is known from two locations in the Eocene Okanagan Highlands, both outcrops of the Ypresian Klondike Mountain Formation in Republic. Two of the fossils, the holotype and paratype 2 were recovered from the UWBM site B4131, which is designated the type locality, while the paratype 1 was from locality A0307, the corner lot site. Modern work on the fossil-bearing strata of the Formation via radiometrically dating has given an estimated age in the Late Ypresian stage of the early Eocene, between 49.4 ± .5 million years ago at the youngest, with an oldest age estimate of 51.2 ± 0.1 million years ago, given based on detrital zircon isotopic data published in 2021.

== History and classification ==
Republicopteron douseae was identified from three type specimens, the holotype, number SR 00-04-06 and paratypes, SRUI 09-95-73 and SR 21-005-001, all of which are compression fossils preserved in the Stonerose Interpretive Center paleoentomological collection. The holotype and paratype 2 were found at the Klondike Mountain Formations. The fossils were described by paleontologists S. Bruce Archibald, Jun-Jie Gu, and Rolf Mathewes (2022) who picked the genus name Republicopteron as a toponym honoring Republic, Washington, and coined the specific epithet douseae as a patronym honoring Cassie Douse who found the holotype.

R. douseae is one of three orthopterans described from the Eocene Okanagan Highlands and the first from Republic. An additional member of the family Palaeorehniidae, Ypopteron nicola was described from the Quilchena site and one promastacid grasshopper, Promastax archaicus was described from the Horsefly shales. Within Palaeorehniidae, all the known genera are monotypic, with two Paleocene members Albertoilus cervirufi from Alberta and Zeuneroptera scotica from Scotland, the two Ypresian genera of the Okanagan Highlands, and the Priabonian Palaeorehnia maculata from Colorado. Due to the sparse volume of specimens known, Archibald, Gu, and Mathewes noted their suspicion that some of the palaeorehniid genera might be synonyms, but they could not make any specific combinations until more fossils were found for study.

== Description ==
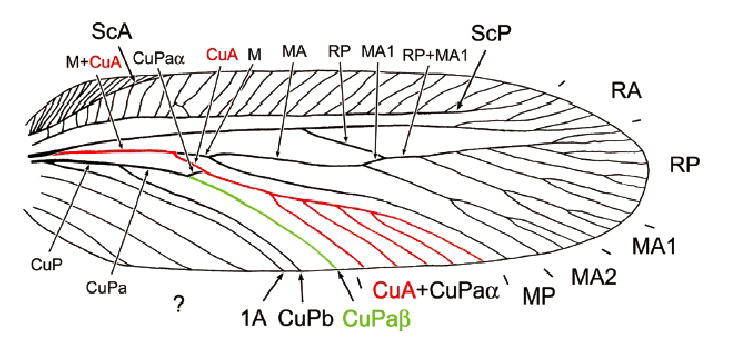
Basic orthopteran wing venation

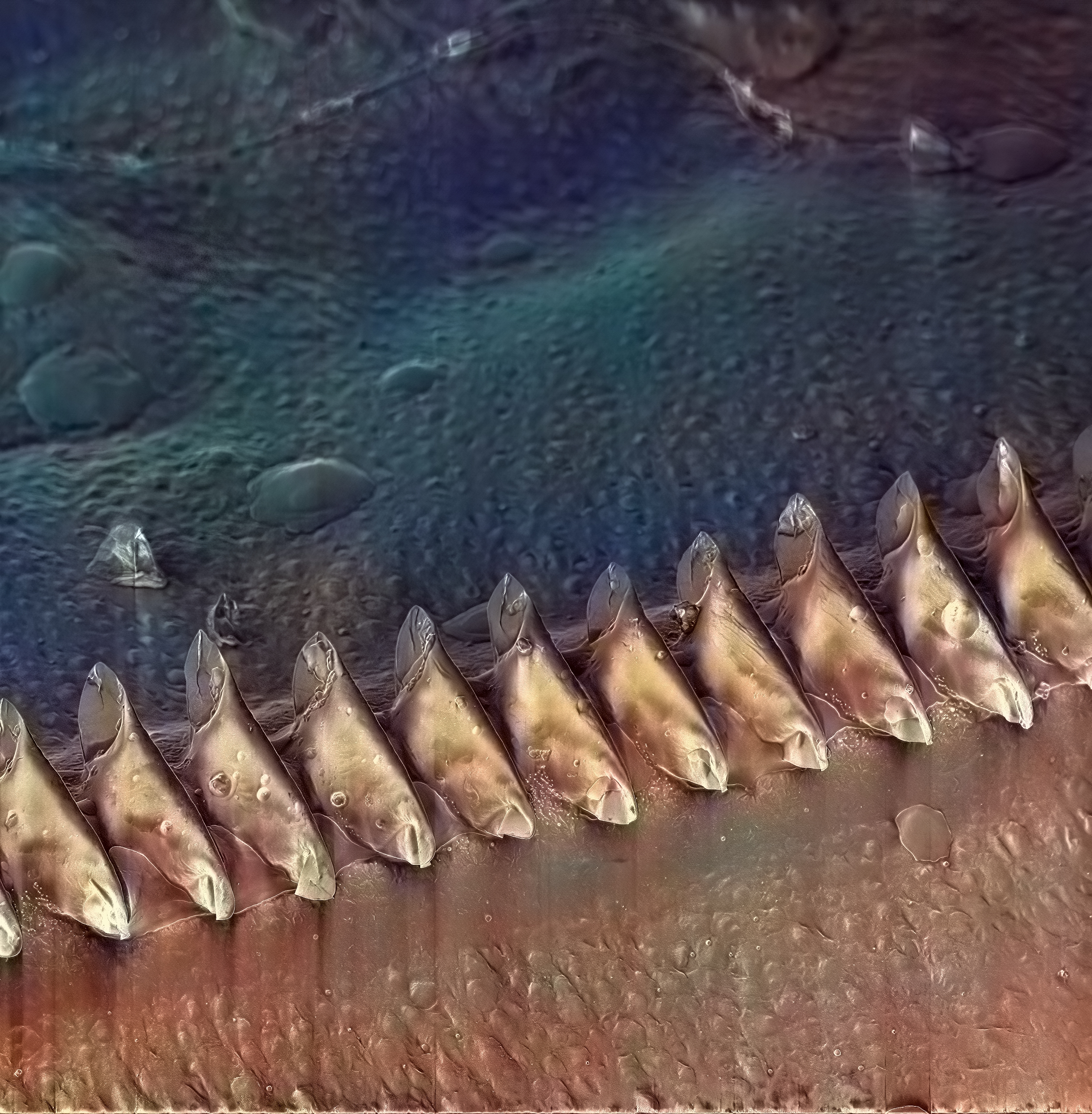
The stridulation rasp of a cricket wing

Overall Republicopteron douseae wings have a dark toned wing color with some scattered light or clear spotting between the veins and cross veins, similar to the patterning type seen in Palaeorehnia maculata but with less intensity. In none of the specimens was the presence of a stridulatory file seen, a situation that is also seen in Ypopteron nicola. As all three known specimens are incomplete, being each about 2–4 cm (0.79–1.57 in) long, a full wing length estimate was not given, but if comparable to Y. nicola then a length over 6.5 cm (2.6 in) would be expected.

R. douseae was distinguished from the other members of Palaeorehniidae based on a set of seven different wing vein characters. Unlike P. maculata, the Anal vein 3A does not have a basal area curving towards the 2A and away from the margin. The posterior space between the 2A and 3A veins is half the width of the space between the 2A and 1A, unlike all other palaeorehniids. The 3A terminates at the wing margin more apically than where the Cubitus-anterior veins CuA and CuPaα merge, a feature not visible in Y. nicola but likely also present there. The first Anal vein 1A runs parallel to the wing margins from its base to the position where the CuA and CuPaα Cubitus veins merge, at which point it curves in towards the center and then runs towards the wing apex, as seen in the preserved material. As with Palaeorehnia, the Radial, R, and Media, M, veins both branch near the same point in the wing, contrary to other Zeuneroptera, the only other genus with that area preserved and identifiable. The basal space in the wing behind the joined CuA+CuPaα is about the same width as the space behind the Cubital-posterior vein CuPaβ, differing from Y. nicola where the posterior CuA+CuPaα space is double in width. Also the length of the CuA+CuPaα from its basal fusion point to where the first branching happens is longer than seen in any other palaeorehniid.

== Paleobiology ==
Katydids and their relatives in Ensifera use modified areas of the fore-wings, called stridulatory files, to produce broadband and pure sound which is used for mate location. The two wings are vibrated against each other, and the files produce specific tones, which are amplified as they pass across certain wing cells. The known wings of Republicopteron are all lacking stridulatory files, possibly indicating that they did not "sing", or sing using the same means as other Ensiferans.

== Paleoenvironment ==
The formation preserves an upland lake system surrounded by a mixed conifer–broadleaf forest with nearby volcanism. The pollen flora has notable elements of birch and golden larch, and distinct trace amounts of fir, spruce, cypress, and palm. Wolfe and Tanai (1987) interpreted the forest climate to have been microthermal, having distinct seasonal temperature swings which dipped below freezing in the winters. However, further study has shown the lake system was surrounded by a warm temperate ecosystem that likely had a mesic upper microthermal to lower mesothermal climate, in which winter temperatures rarely dropped low enough for snow, and which were seasonably equitable. The Okanagan highlands paleoforest surrounding the lakes have been described as precursors to the modern temperate broadleaf and mixed forests of Eastern North America and Eastern Asia. Based on the fossil biotas the lakes were higher and cooler than the coeval coastal forests preserved in the Puget Group and Chuckanut Formation of Western Washington, which are described as lowland tropical forest ecosystems. Estimates of the paleoelevation range between 0.7–1.2 km (0.43–0.75 mi) higher than the coastal forests. This is consistent with the paleoelevation estimates for the lake systems, which range between 1.1–2.9 km (1,100–2,900 m), which is similar to the modern elevation 0.8 km (0.50 mi), but higher.

Estimates of the mean annual temperature for the Klondike Mountain Formation have been derived from climate leaf analysis multivariate program (CLAMP) analysis and leaf margin analysis (LMA) of the Republic paleoflora. The CLAMP results after multiple linear regressions for Republic gave a mean annual temperature of approximately 8.0 °C (46.4 °F), while the LMA gave 9.2 ± 2.0 °C (48.6 ± 3.6 °F). This is lower than the mean annual temperature estimates given for the coastal Puget Group, which is estimated to have been between 15–18.6 °C (59.0–65.5 °F). The bioclimatic analysis for Republic suggests mean annual precipitation amounts of 115 ± 39 cm (45 ± 15 in).
