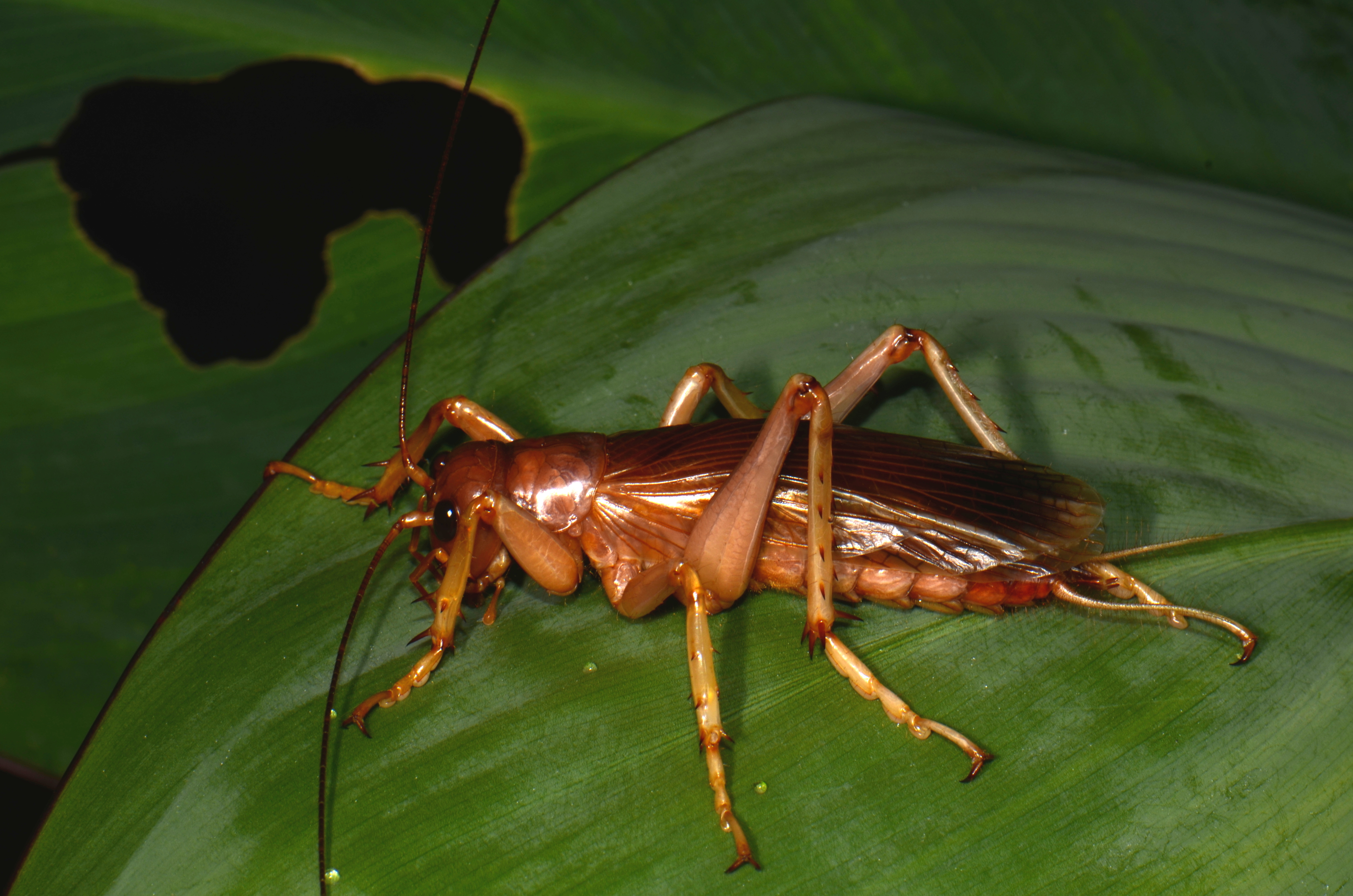
- Sia ferox

Scientific classification
- Domain: Eukaryota
- Kingdom: Animalia
- Phylum: Arthropoda
- Class: Insecta
- Order: Orthoptera
- Suborder: Ensifera
- Family: Stenopelmatidae
- Subfamily: Stenopelmatinae
- Tribe: Siini
- Genus: Sia; Giebel, 1861

Species
- See text

Synonyms
- Bugajus Brunner von Wattenwyl, 1888; Licola Walker, 1869

= Sia (insect) =

Genus of cricket-like animals

Sia is a genus of Orthopteran insects in the family Stenopelmatidae, recorded from western Malesia.

== Species ==
The Orthoptera Species File lists:

1. Sia bugajus Gorochov, 2021 - Borneo
2. Sia ferox Giebel, 1861 - type species - Java
3. Sia incisa Karny, 1926 - Sumatra, peininsular Malaysia
