= Maxentia Rheinberger =

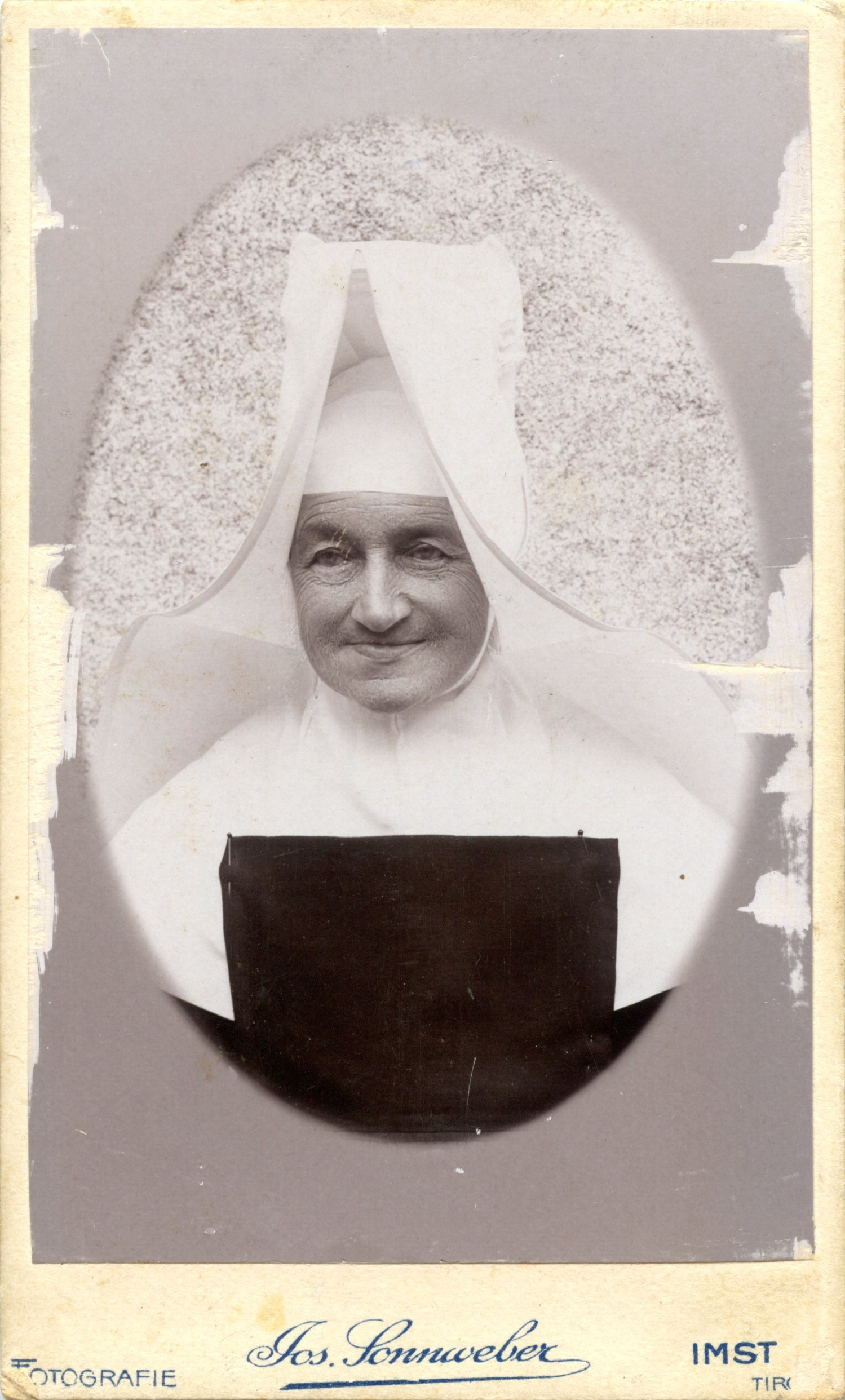
- Born: August 24, 1832; Vaduz
- Died: October 31, 1917 (aged 85); Zams
- Occupation: Nun, matron
- Parent(s): Johann Peter Rheinberger
- Relatives: David Rheinberger, Peter Rheinberger, Josef Rheinberger
- Awards: Golden Cross of Merit

Maxentia Rheinberger (August 24, 1832 – October 31, 1917) was a Liechtensteiner nun. She served as superior general of the Sisters of Charity of St. Vincent de Paul in Zams from 1906 to 1915.

She was born Johanna "Hanni" Rheinberger on August 24, 1832 in Vaduz, the eldest daughter of Johann Peter Rheinberger, a land agent, and his second wife, Elisabeth Rheinberger, née Carigiet. Among her ten siblings and step-siblings were Regierungssekretär David Rheinberger, politician Peter Rheinberger, and composer Josef Rheinberger. After a protracted fight with her father that lasted over a year, she entered the Sisters of Charity in 1852, taking the name Sister Maxentia. From 1854–1861, she was a teacher at girls' schools in the small villages of Silz and Zirl in Tyrol. She returned to Zams to teach at the same teacher training college that had taught her. She taught there until 1897, serving as director of the college from 1887–1888. Her next teaching role was at a women's prison in Schwaz, from 1902 to 1906. She served as secretary to the superior general, overseeing the reconstruction of the congregation's monastery after a devastating fire in 1870. She served as vicar from 1861 to 1891, vicar general from 1891 to 1902, and superior general from 1906 to 1915.

She was awarded the Golden Cross of Merit in 1914 by Emperor Franz Joseph. Maxentia Rheinberger died on October 31, 1917 in Zams.
