= Oryctopus =

Scientific classification
- Domain: Eukaryota
- Kingdom: Animalia
- Phylum: Arthropoda
- Class: Insecta
- Order: Orthoptera
- Suborder: Ensifera
- Family: Stenopelmatidae
- Subfamily: Stenopelmatinae
- Tribe: Oryctopini; Kevan, 1986
- Genus: Oryctopus; Brunner von Wattenwyl, 1888

Genus of cricket-like animals

Oryctopus is a genus of insect in the subfamily Stenopelmatinae and the sole genus in the tribe Oryctopini. Species have been recorded from India and Sri Lanka.

== Species ==
The Orthoptera Species File lists:

1. Oryctopus bolivari Brunner von Wattenwyl, 1888 - type species
2. Oryctopus bouvieri Karny, 1935
3. Oryctopus prodigiosus Bolívar, 1900
4. Oryctopus sordellii (Griffini, 1914)
