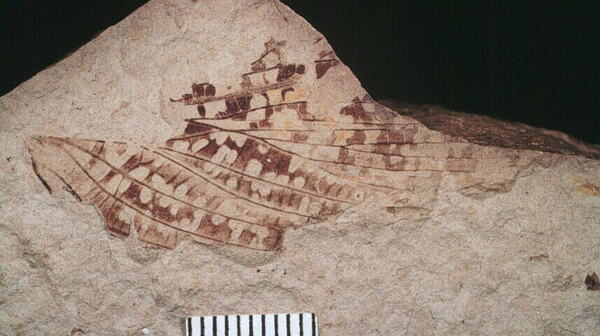
- Palaeorehnia maculata holotype wing

Scientific classification
- Kingdom: Animalia
- Phylum: Arthropoda
- Clade: Pancrustacea
- Class: Insecta
- Order: Orthoptera
- Suborder: Ensifera
- Infraorder: incertae sedis
- Family: †Palaeorehniidae; Zeuner, 1937

Genera
- see text

Synonyms
- †Palaeorehniinae; †Zeuneropterinae

= Palaeorehniidae =

Palaeorehniidae Temporal range: Thanetian-Priabonian ~58–43 Ma

Extinct family cricket-like animals

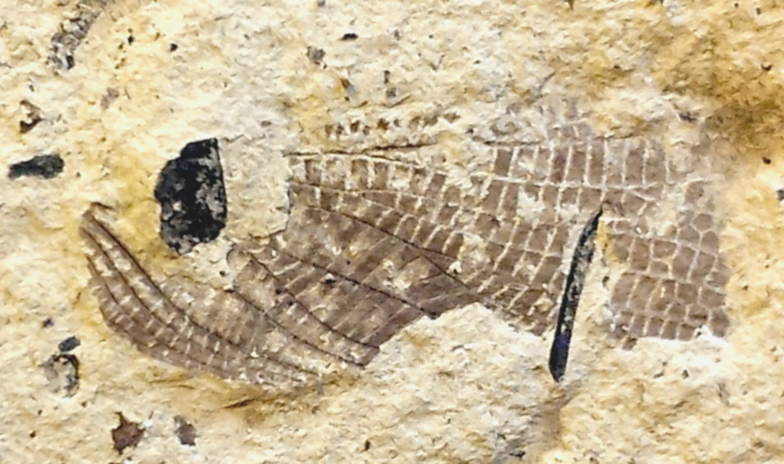
Republicopteron douseae Klondike Mountain Formation

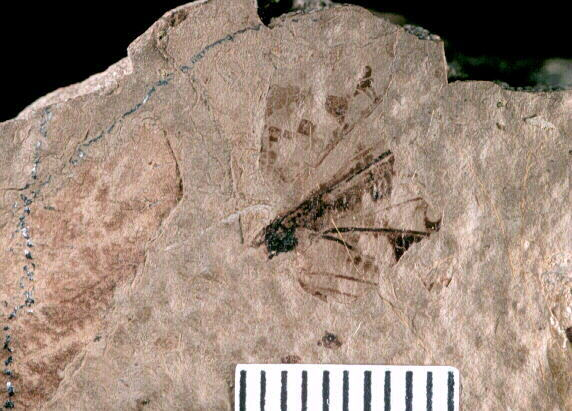
Sudders "Cymatomera maculata" type fossil

Palaeorehniidae is an extinct family of katydid-like orthopterans that has been described from the fossil record. The family is known from the Paleocene to the end of the Eocene (65 to 35 million years ago) and has been described from North America and Scotland. Circumscription and placement of the group has changed several times since it was first described in 1939, with the group currently treated as a family that is incertae sedis in the suborder Ensifera. Five monotypic genera are assigned to the family.

== History ==
The first palaeorehniid identified was by Samuel H. Scudder (1890) who described a very partial body fossil from Florissant placed the new species as "Cymatomera maculata". The species was briefly discussed again by Theodore D. A. Cockerell (1908) who considered it as too incomplete to be certain of affinity, and the placement within Cymatomera tenuous at best. Cockerell described a much more complete wing found in 1906 and placed it into Scudders species, which he moved to the new genus Palaeorehnia. However he did not assign any placement of the genus to a specific ensiferan family. Frederick Zeuner (1937) first named the subfamily Palaeorehniinae to accommodate Palaeorehnia and the Jurassic genus Jurassobatea, which he suggested to be related, and placed the subfamily into the family Gryllacrididae as then circumscribed. Two years later Zeuner (1939) described a second species of Palaeorehnia as P. scotica, the only palaeorehniid known outside of North America, while documenting the orthopteran fossils of the British Museum. That species was revisited by Aleksandr Sharov (1962) who moved it to a separate genus Zeuneroptera. Additionally the now monotypic Palaeorehnia was moved by him from Palaeorehniinae and considered incertae sedis in the family Haglidae. Keith Kevan and Dennis Wighton (1981) described a new North American genus, Albertoilus, that they placed in Prophalangopsidae. Two years later they revisited Palaeorehniinae, which no longer included the type genus, and as such they coined the replacement name Zeuneropterinae for the group in Gryllacrididae, which they moved Albertoilus to. The placement and composition of these groups were not addressed again until 2022 when S. Bruce Archibald, Jun-Jie Gu, and Rolf Mathewes described two new genera from Ypresian sites in British Columbia and Washington state. With the description of Republicopteron and Ypopteron they reassessed the generic composition of Zeuneropterinae and its possible superfamily relationships. They deemed Palaeorehnia to be related to Albertoilus, Zeuneroptera and their two new genera, while also elevating the group as a whole from a subfamily to a family. They revived the original subfamily name Palaeorehniinae and emended it to Palaeorehniidae to reflect the re-inclusion of the type genus Palaeorehnia and the groups new family status. Due to the forewing venation of the known specimens. The superfamily Stenopelmatoidea is noted to have long CuA+CuPaα, CuPaβ, CuPb, and 1A wing veins, a feature that only some palaeorehniids show, however others do not, with venation that is closer in aspect to Hagloidea appearing. Due to the incomplete nature of all known Palaeorehniidae fossils, Archibald, Gu, and Mathewes decided to leave the family without a superfamily placement in Ensifera, and discussed the possibilities of placement within Hagloidea, Stenopelmatoidea, or an intermediate superfamily or clade that is yet unnamed.

== Distribution ==
Zeuneroptera is the only genus recovered from outside North America, and is one of the two oldest genera. The single known fossil is from the Late Paleocene, Thanetian age Staffa Formations Ardtun locality on the Isle of Mull, Scotland. Of the North American genera, Albertoilus is from the oldest strata, being from the Paskapoo Formation in Alberta which is also dated as Thanetian. From the slightly younger sediments of the Ypresian Eocene Okanagan Highlands are the genera Republicopteron and Ypopteron. They are from the coeval upland temperate strata of the Klondike Mountain Formation in Washington state and the Coldwater Beds of South central British Columbia. The youngest known occurrence of the family is by the type genus Palaeorehnia, exclusively from the Late Eocene, Priabonian sediments of the Florissant Formation in Colorado.

== Genera and species ==
The family comprises five monotypic genera:

- Albertoilus Kevan & Wighton, 1981
  - Albertoilus cervirufi Kevan & Wighton, 1981
- Palaeorehnia Cockerell, 1908
  - Palaeorehnia maculata (Scudder, 1890) - Priabonian; Florissant Formation, Colorado
- Republicopteron Archibald, Gu & Mathewes, 2022
  - Republicopteron douseae Archibald, Gu & Mathewes, 2022 - Ypresian; Klondike Mountain Formation, Washington
- Ypopteron Archibald, Gu & Mathewes, 2022
  - Ypopteron nicola Archibald, Gu & Mathewes, 2022 - Ypresian; Coldwater Beds, British Columbia
- Zeuneroptera Sharov, 1962
  - Zeuneroptera scotica (Zeuner, 1939) - Thanetian; Staffa formation, Isle of Mull
