= Sand grass =

Sand grass or sandgrass is a common name for several plants and may refer to:

- Mibora
- Stipa
- Triplasis
