= Snow Creek, California =

Unincorporated community in California, United States

Coordinates: 33.8900160°N 116.6841822°W

Snow Creek, also known as Snow Creek Village, is a small unincorporated community in Riverside County, California. It is located roughly northwest of Palm Springs, on the western edge of the Santa Rosa and San Jacinto Mountains National Monument, and roughly southeast of the San Gorgonio Pass. It is named after nearby Snow Creek.

The community consists of less than 40 dwellings, with a single 2-mile road connecting it to California State Route 111.
