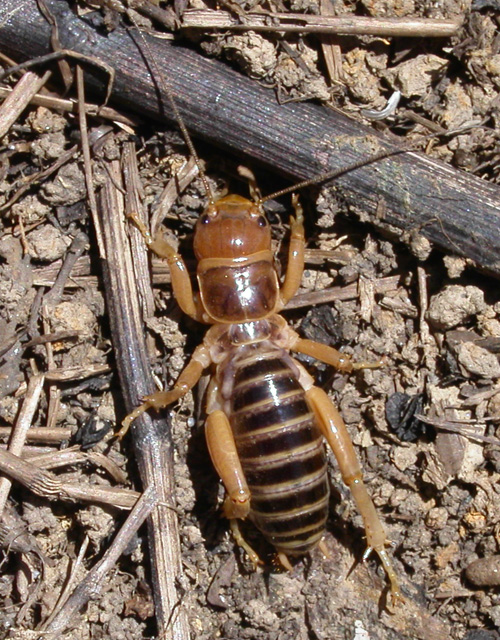
- Ammopelmatus fuscus

Scientific classification
- Kingdom: Animalia
- Phylum: Arthropoda
- Clade: Pancrustacea
- Class: Insecta
- Order: Orthoptera
- Suborder: Ensifera
- Family: Stenopelmatidae
- Subfamily: Stenopelmatinae
- Tribe: Stenopelmatini

Genera
- Ammopelmatus; Stenopelmatus

= Jerusalem cricket =

Type of cricket-like animals

Jerusalem crickets (or potato bugs) are a group of large, flightless insects in the genera Ammopelmatus and Stenopelmatus, together comprising the tribe Stenopelmatini. The former genus is native to the Western United States and parts of Mexico, while the latter genus is from Central America.

Despite their common names, these insects are neither true crickets (which belong to the family Gryllidae), nor are they native to Jerusalem. These nocturnal insects use their strong mandibles to feed primarily on dead organic matter, but can also eat other insects. Their highly adapted feet are used for burrowing beneath moist soil to feed on decaying root plants and tubers. Despite this, they are not considered serious agriculture pests. One species, Stenopelmatus talpa, is known to be cannibalistic in the immature stages, but in other species the only known cannibalism is females eating the males after mating.

While Jerusalem crickets are not venomous, they can emit a foul smell and are capable of inflicting a painful bite. Jerusalem crickets are an important food source for many species of birds, bats, mammals, and other insects during the night.

== Description ==
Their shiny wingless body consists of an exceptionally rotund abdomen with black stripes and a large, bulbous head with its thorax bearing the same width. Their coloration is most commonly a reddish-brown body with lighter legs, but this can range from light tan to a dark mahogany, depending on the habitat it lives. For instance, those found in forests will often be darker and those in deserts will often be lighter. They have relatively short, thick legs that bear small spines to help them burrow and defend themselves. Many nocturnal predators rely on the Jerusalem cricket as a food source, especially in the winter. Some that hunt them include foxes, skunks, opossums, barn owls, burrowing owls, kestrels, and pallid bats. When threatened, Jerusalem crickets will flip over to snap their powerful mandibles and kick their hind legs at its attacker.

Jerusalem crickets spend a majority of their living underground. Their egg masses are laid in holes in the soil. After hatching, nymphs perform several molts, up to 10, for about 1-2 years until they reach sexual maturity where they live for 2-6 months. Adults can reach up to 2 to 3 inches in length. There is little evidence of sexual dimorphism in Jerusalem crickets, except that females are often larger in size, while males have longer hind legs. Females will often eat their male counterparts after mating.

Jerusalem crickets are well-adapted to living in sandy soils, but can be found in sand dunes, chaparrals, grasslands, woodlands, and forests hiding underneath debris, such as rocks, wood, etc. and digging underground burrows. Geographical isolation can be seen in many species endemic to sand dunes and mountains and have become easily affected by habitat fragmentation.

== Classification ==
Nineteen species are recognized as valid in the genus Stenopelmatus, as presently delimited (with 13 more of uncertain status and potentially not valid), though the genus was formerly much larger, including most of the species now placed in the genus Ammopelmatus, which contains 20 additional species. The family Stenopelmatidae and subfamily Stenopelmatinae contain several Old World genera, but only the genera in the tribe Stenopelmatini (all New World) are referred to as Jerusalem crickets. Other families in the same superfamily (Stenopelmatoidea) in Australia and New Zealand include the weta and king crickets. They are similar to stenopelmatines in many respects.

== Communication ==
The Jerusalem cricket's song features a characteristic drumming sound.

Ammopelmatus fuscus

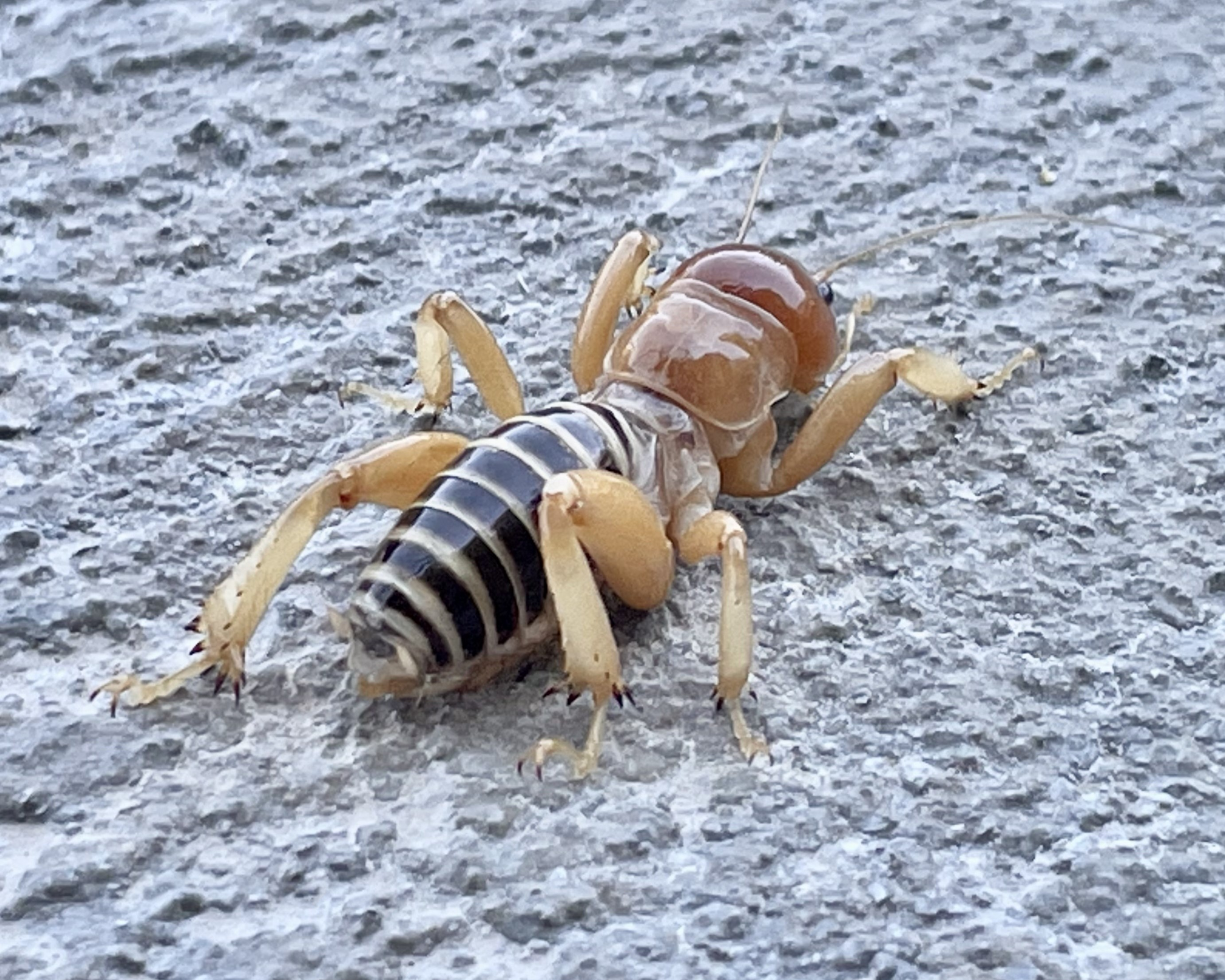
Idahoan "potato bug" A. fuscus

Similar to true crickets, each species of Jerusalem cricket produces a different song during mating. This song takes the form of a characteristic drumming in which the insect beats its abdomen against the ground.

No species have wings with sound-producing structures and do not possess organs for hearing. Instead, Jerusalem crickets rely on substrate vibrations for communication, which are felt by subgenual organs located in all six of the insect's legs. This contrasts with true crickets and katydids, which use their wings to produce sounds and have hearing organs to sense sounds of others. Jerusalem crickets seem unable to hiss by forcing air through their spiracles, as some beetles and cockroaches do. Instead, the few Jerusalem crickets that do make sound rub their hind legs against the sides of the abdomen, producing a rasping, hissing noise. This hiss may serve to deter predators rather than to communicate with other crickets.

== Cultural significance ==
The Jerusalem cricket is of great importance to several Native American cultures. The Hopi and Navajo are some of many tribes in southwestern United States that viewed this insect as a powerful cultural symbol. Its striking appearance leads some to think the Jerusalem cricket brings mortality, depicted in the folklore of the Chumash people and recorded by American entomologist Edward Oliver Essig.

The Hopi, who settled in Arizona, portray this cricket as a spirit being kachina named Sösööpa who races. As a result, it's often carved into Hopi katsina dolls as a yellow humanlike character with black beady eyes, a black-and-white plaid skirt, and antennae made from sand grass, depicting native traits of the Jerusalem cricket. The Navajo also carry many myths based on the Jerusalem cricket. For instance, the cricket was associated with the Yucca plant, in which you had to eat the plant as a cure to its bite. This possibly gave rise to the misconception that their bite is venomous. The Chumash in southern California also have many traditional stories centered around the Jerusalem cricket's identity and appearance. Indigenous communities also used this insect for food.

== Names ==
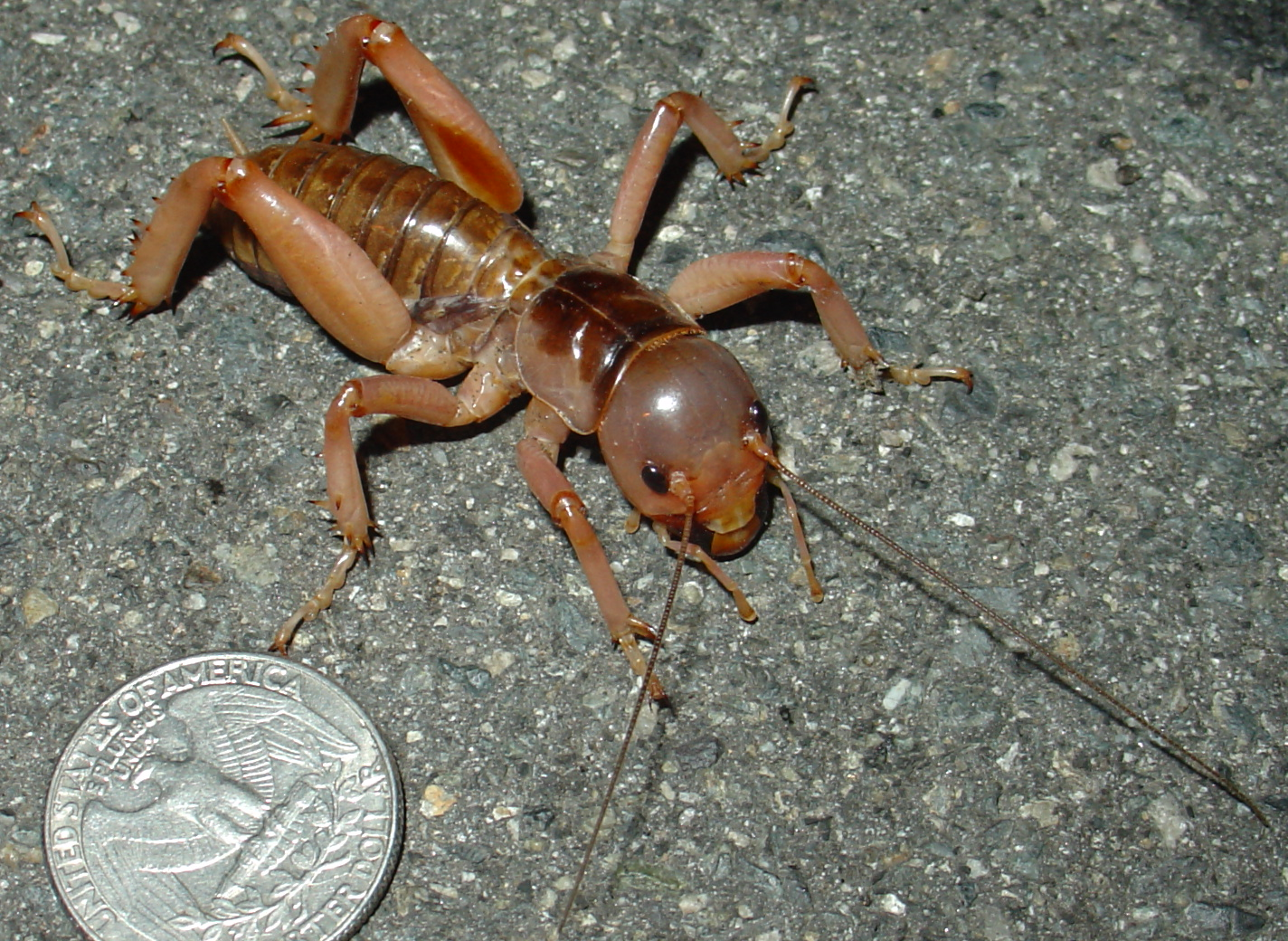
Mahogany Jerusalem cricket (Ammopelmatus n. sp. "mahogany") next to a 2.4 cm quarter

Several hypotheses attempt to explain the origin of the term "Jerusalem cricket". One suggests the term originated from a mixing of Navajo and Christian terminology, resulting from the influence Franciscan priests had on the Navajo language. Such priests may have heard the Navajos speak of a "skull insect" and took this as a reference to Calvary (also known as Skull Hill) outside Jerusalem near the place where Jesus was crucified.

Several Navajo names refer to the insect's head:

- c’ic’in lici (Tsiitsʼiin łichíʼí) "red-skull"
- c’os bic’ic lici (Chʼosh bitsiitsʼiin łichíʼí) "red-skull bug"
- c’ic’in lici’ I coh (Tsiitsʼiin łichíʼítsoh) "big red-skull"
- wo se c’ini or rositsini or yo sic’ini (Wóó tsiitsʼiin/Yaaʼ tsiitsʼiiní) "skull insect"

Other names include the Hopi qalatötö ("shiny bug"), the Spanish niño de la tierra ("child of the earth") and cara de niño ("child's face").

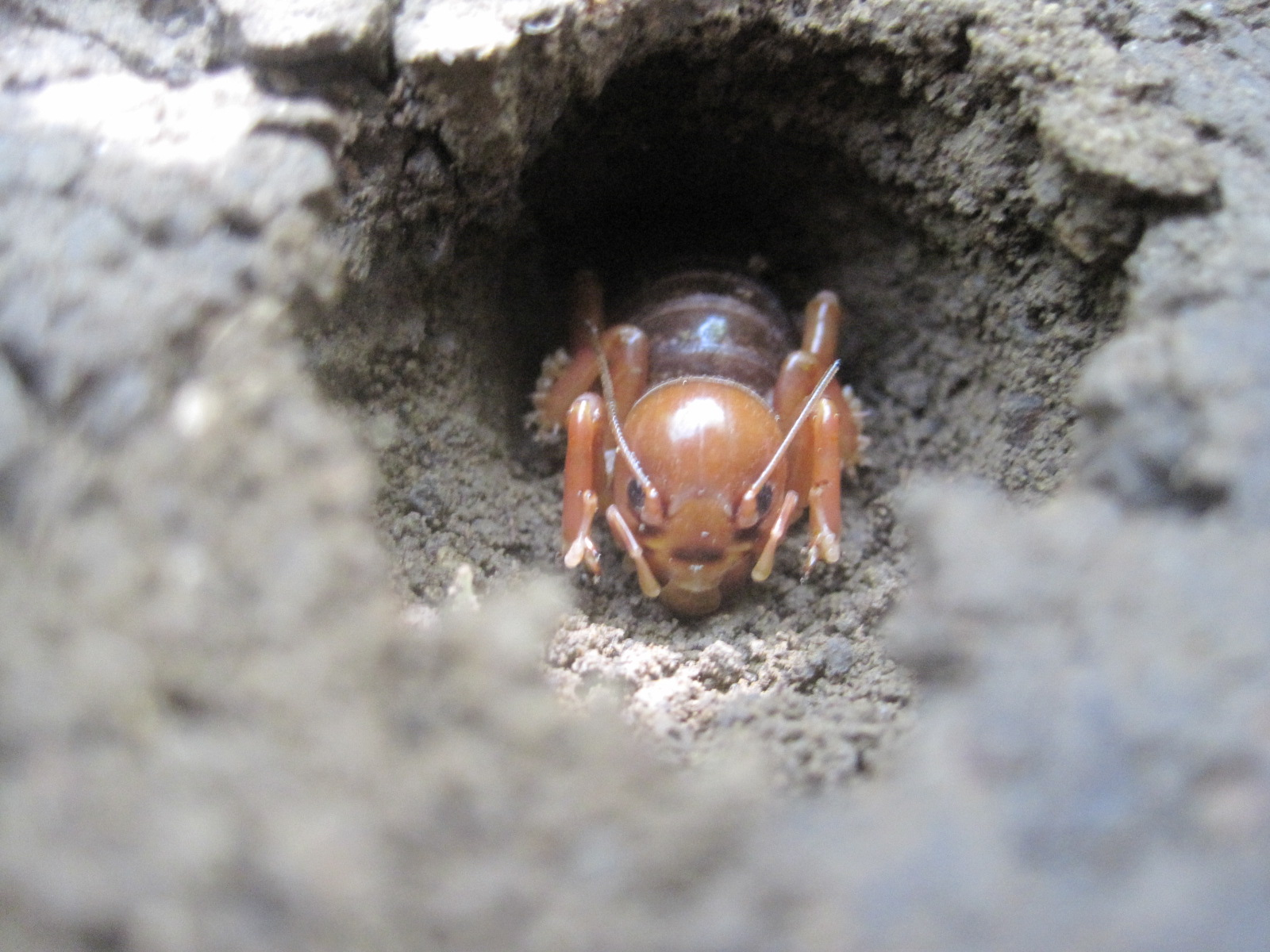
Jerusalem cricket in its burrow
