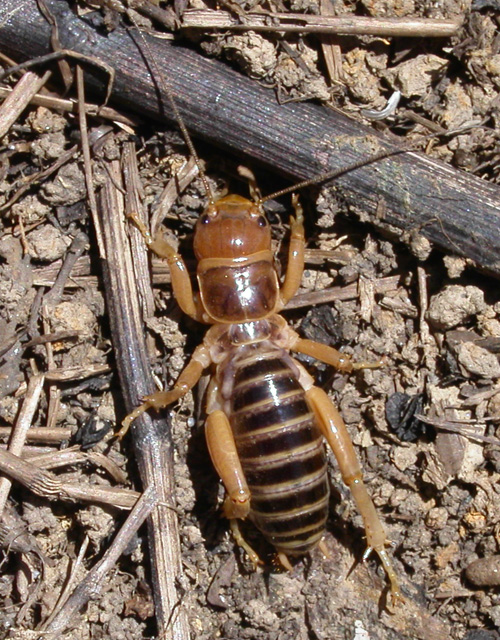
- Stenopelmatus fuscus

Scientific classification
- Kingdom: Animalia
- Phylum: Arthropoda
- Clade: Pancrustacea
- Class: Insecta
- Order: Orthoptera
- Suborder: Ensifera
- Superfamily: Stenopelmatoidea
- Family: Stenopelmatidae; Burmeister, 1838

Genera
- see text

= Stenopelmatidae =

Family of cricket-like animals

Stenopelmatidae is a family of large, mostly flightless orthopterans that includes the Jerusalem crickets. Two genera: Ammopelmatus and the type genus Stenopelmatus are found in the New World. Oryctopus and Sia are Old World genera, and previously placed in their own subfamilies (see below), but with the addition of new genera, current placement is as five tribes in the single subfamily Stenopelmatinae.

== Classification ==
The classification and constituency of Stenopelmatidae is an ongoing source of controversy, with different authorities proposing radically different arrangements. Until recently, the majority of researchers appeared to accept a major New World lineage as the subfamily Stenopelmatinae, with smaller Old World lineages and fossil groups also treated as subfamilies. At least one other authority, working exclusively with morphological characters, has instead repeatedly proposed that Stenopelmatidae contains the family Gryllacrididae as a subfamily, and also the entire superfamily Schizodactyloidea, similarly reduced to the rank of subfamily (e.g.), a result explicitly rejected by other researchers. In this morphological classification, the entire historical constituency of Stenopelmatidae is reduced to a single subfamily, with the former subfamilies all reduced to tribal rank.

As such, the majority of classifications have until recently recognized the following groups (with the genus Maxentius only removed from inclusion within the genus Sia in 2021):

- monotypic subfamily Oryctopinae Kevan, 1986
  - Tribe Oryctopini Kevan, 1986
    - Genus Oryctopus Brunner von Wattenwyl, 1888
- obsolete subfamily Siinae Gorochov, 1988
  - Genus Maxentius Stal, 1876
  - Genus Sia Giebel, 1861
- previously as subfamily Stenopelmatinae Burmeister, 1838 and now tribe Stenopelmatini
  - Genus Ammopelmatus Tinkham, 1965
  - Genus Stenopelmatus Burmeister, 1838

Note:

- the genera †Electrosia Gorochov, 2010 and †Macrelcana Karny, 1932 are now placed in the family †Elcanidae.
- genus †Zeuneroptera Sharov, 1962 is now placed in the family †Palaeorehniidae.
