= Hyphomycetes =

Scientific classification
- Kingdom: Fungi
- Division: Deuteromycota
- Class: Hyphomycetes; Fr.

Orders
- Hyphomycetales (obsolete); Stilbellales (obsolete); Tuberculariales (obsolete)

Group of fungi

Hyphomycetes are a form classification of fungi, part of what has often been referred to as fungi imperfecti, Deuteromycota, or anamorphic fungi. Hyphomycetes lack closed fruit bodies, and are often referred to as moulds (or molds). Most hyphomycetes are now mainly assigned to the Ascomycota, on the basis of genetic connections made by life-cycle studies or by phylogenetic analysis of DNA sequences; somemany remain unassigned phylogenetically. There are also some basidiomycete species, with aquatic presence noted in certain Corticiaceae and Urediniomycetes.

Although no longer considered a phylogenetically defined taxon, the prevalence of hyphomycete forms in nature, the built environment, and laboratories means that identification of members this group remains of practical importance.

== Taxonomic and nomenclatural history ==
Because asexual forms of fungi usually occur separately from their sexual forms, when microscopic fungi began to be studied in the early 19th century, it was often unknown when two morphologically different forms were actually part of one species. The tendency for some organisms to apparently only have asexual forms, or for their sexual forms to be discovered long after the asexual forms, meant that an independent taxonomy was developed for asexual fungi. Near the beginning of the 20th century, when it became clearer that many asexual and sexual forms were related, the concept of 'form taxa' was developed. The independent taxonomy of asexual forms was regarded as artificial, not representative of evolutionary relationships, and intended to be practical for identification purposes. The taxonomy of the sexual states was considered the true classification. The result was that many fungal species ended up with two accepted Latin binomials, one for the asexual form (or anamorph) and the other for the sexual form (teleomorph). This dual nomenclature was only abandoned in January 2012, and the transition to a single name system, with one name representing all morphs of a fungus, is still incomplete.

== Identification ==
Traditional identification of hyphomycetes was primarily based on microscopic morphology including: conidial morphology, especially septation, shape, size, colour and cell wall texture, the arrangement of conidia as they are borne on the conidiogenous cells (e.g. if they are solitary, in chains, or produced in slime), the type of conidiogenous cell (e.g. non-specialized or hypha-like, phialide, annellide, or sympodial), and other additional features such as the presence of sporodochia or synnemata.

For species growing in culture, or in environmental DNA studies, most identifications of Hyphomycetes are now done with DNA barcoding. This is not always possible, however, for archival specimens or samples such as microscopic slides from air samples.

== Ecological importance ==
Aquatic hyphomycetes or Ingoldian hyphomycetes are common on submerged decaying leaves and other organic matter, especially in clean running water with good aeration. Colonised leaves fall from the tree into the river. Their branched, septate mycelium penetrates through the leaf surface and spreads through leaf tissue. Conidiophores project into the water and bear conidia, which are often sigmoid, branched or tetraradiate structures. Aquatic hyphomycetes play an important role in the breakdown of organic matter in rivers, because their extracellular enzymes break down leaf tissue, which in turn is made more palatable to invertebrates. Leaves with fungi (conditioned) are a more nutritious source of food for benthic insects and snails than unconditioned leaves. Certain aquatic hyphomycetes are also found as mycoparasites, and biotrophs; like Naiadella fluitans and Gyoerffyella entomobryoides, respectively. Common species include Hymenoscuphus tetracladius and Tetracladium marchalianum.

Coprophilous or dung-loving hyphomycetes are part of the succession of fungi occurring on many kinds of herbivore faeces, playing an important role in breaking down cellulose. Several species are found only on dung, such as Angulimaya sundara, Onychophora coprophila, Pulchromyces fimicola, Sphondylocephalum verticillatum and Stilbella fimetaria.

Entomogenous, entomopathogenic or insect-pathogenic hyphomycetes infect and kill insects (and spiders) and are especially diverse in tropical and subtropical regions, especially in Asia. Most are asexual states of or phylogenetically related to the Ascomycete families, Cordycipitaceae and Ophiocordycipitaceae. Insect hosts are infected by asexual spores, which germinate and grow to fill the host body with mycelium, or hyphal bodies, and then produce sporulating structures on the insect carcass. They are often found on dead insects under bark or in soil, but some affect insect behaviour ("zombie fungus"), for example causing infected hosts to climb towards the light, ensuring that air-borne infective spores will be released higher up in the canopy of the forest or meadow. Well-known entomogenous hyphomycetes are classified in Beauveria, Metarhizium and Tolypocladium; famous anamorphic generic names such as Akanthomyces, Gibellula, Hirsutella, Hymenostilbe and Isaria are now subsumed in genera formerly considered sexual, such as Cordyceps, Ophiocordyceps and Torubiella under fungal single-name nomenclature. Species of Beauveria and Metarhizium show some promise as biological control agents against pest insects. Tolypocladium inflatum was the original source of cyclosporine A, used as a drug to prevent rejection of organ transplants.

Many food-borne fungi are also hyphomycetes. Species of Penicillium and Aspergillus are particularly common agents of food spoilage and also produce important mycotoxins that affect human health. Some species, such as Penicillium digitatum on citrus fruits, and Penicillium expansum on apples, are common on specific foods, while others are less specialized and grow on many different kinds of food.

Nematophagous or nematode-trapping hyphomycetes either live their life-cycles in the bodies of dead nematodes or trap and kill nematodes in order to supplement their nitrogen requirements. Species of the hyphomycete genus Arthrobotrys, phylogenetically related to - or being the asexual forms of Orbilia - produce constricting loops that quickly shut to grab nematodes, or non-constricting loops or hyphal networks that entangle nematodes, or sticky knobs that adhere to nematodes as they swim by. Attempts to exploit these fungi as biological control agents against agriculturally harmful nematodes have generally been unsuccessful.

== See also ==
- Acremonium
- Alternaria
- Aspergillus
- Beauveria
- Chrysosporium
- Cladosporium
- Fusarium
- Geomyces
- Geotrichum
- Gliocladium
- Graphium
- Isaria
- Madurella
- Malbranchea
- Paecilomyces
- Penicillium
- Scedosporium
- Scopulariopsis
- Sepedonium
- Stachybotrys
- Tolypocladium
- Trichoderma
- Trichothecium
- Verticillium
- Wallemia

== Literature ==
- Seifert, Keith A.; Morgan-Jones, Gareth; Gams, Walter; Kendrick, Bryce (2011). "The Genera of Hyphomycetes". CBS Biodiversity Series (9). CBS-KNAW Fungal Biodiversity Centre. ISBN 9789070351854. ISSN 1571-8859.
