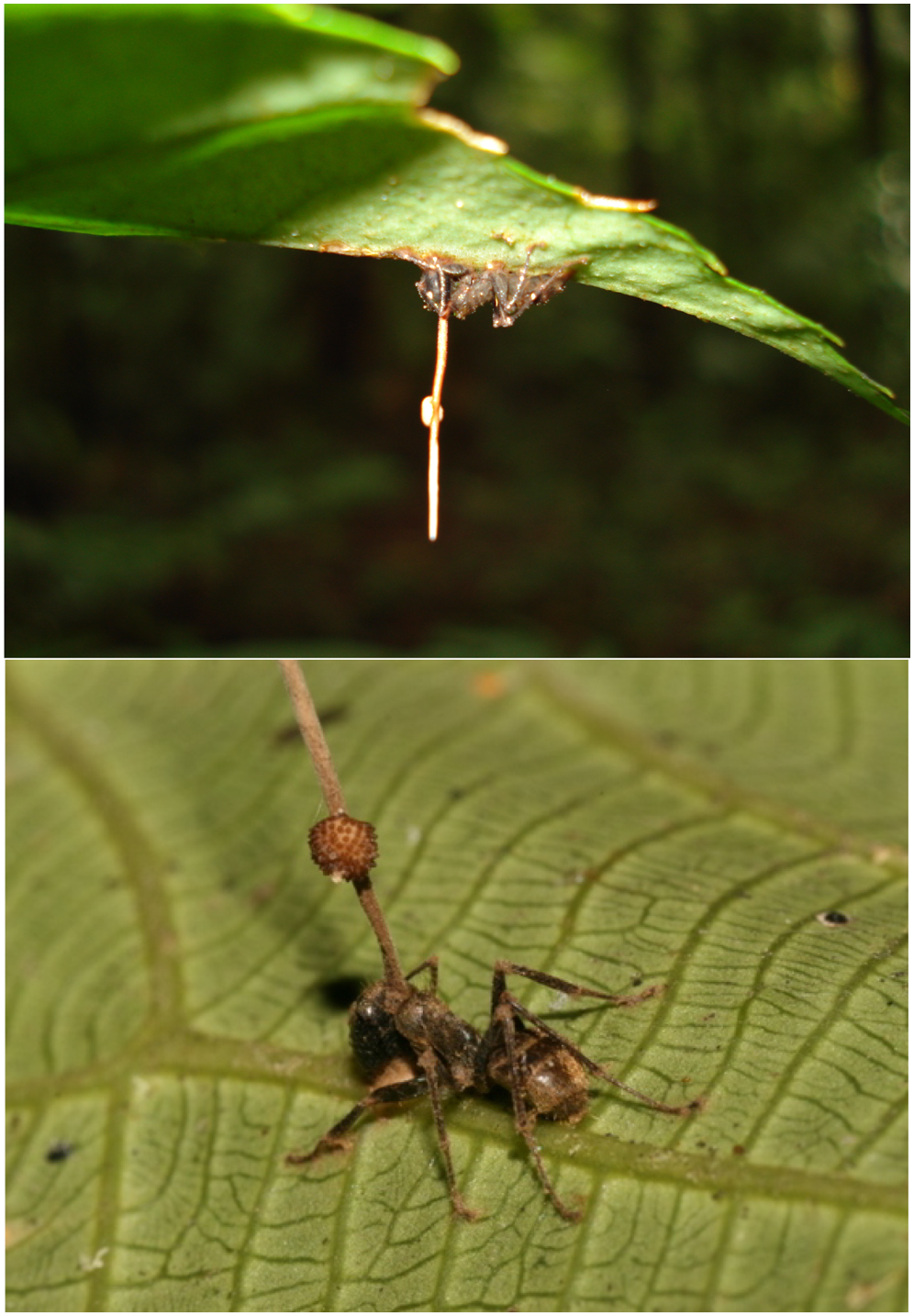
- Dead ants infected with Ophiocordyceps unilateralis

Scientific classification
- Kingdom: Fungi
- Division: Ascomycota
- Class: Sordariomycetes
- Order: Hypocreales
- Family: Ophiocordycipitaceae
- Genus: Ophiocordyceps
- Species: O. unilateralis

Binomial name
- Ophiocordyceps unilateralis (Tul.) Petch (1931)

Synonyms
- Torrubia unilateralis Tul. (1865); Cordyceps unilateralis (Tul.) Sacc. (1883)

= Ophiocordyceps unilateralis =

Species of fungus

Ophiocordyceps unilateralis, commonly known as zombie-ant fungus, is an insect-pathogenic fungus, discovered by the British naturalist Alfred Russel Wallace in 1859. Zombie ants, infected by the Ophiocordyceps unilateralis fungus, are predominantly found in tropical rainforests.

These fungi thrive in warm, humid environments, which are ideal for their growth and reproduction. However, they can also be found in warm-temperate forest systems. The fungus primarily targets ants from the tribe Camponotini, including carpenter ants (genus Camponotus).

O. unilateralis infects ants of the tribe Camponotini, with the full pathogenesis being characterized by alteration of the behavioral patterns of the infected ant. Infected hosts leave their canopy nests and foraging trails for the forest floor, an area with a temperature and humidity suitable for fungal growth; they then use their mandibles to attach themselves to a major vein on the underside of a leaf, where the host remains after its eventual death. The process, leading up to mortality, takes 4–10 days, and includes a reproductive stage where fruiting bodies grow from the ant's head, rupturing to release the fungus's spores. O. unilateralis is, in turn, also susceptible to fungal infection itself, an occurrence that can limit its impact on ant populations, which has otherwise been known to devastate ant colonies.

Related species, like Tolypocladium inflatum produce secondary metabolites that have been a source of valuable pharmaceuticals. Organisms like O. unilateralis have often evolved to produce specific metabolites for their antibacterial and/or host modulating activities. As a result, some of these metabolites may prove to be useful pharmaceuticals.

== Systematics ==
After years of research, the taxonomy of Ophiocordyceps unilateralis is becoming increasingly clear.

=== Cordyceps vs Ophiocordyceps ===
Throughout history there has been confusion about the distinction between the genera Cordyceps and Ophiocordyceps. There have been many debates about whether the zombie-ant fungus (and other fungi) belonged to one or to the other as Ophiocordyceps was only recently brought forward.

The genus Cordyceps comprises over 400 species, historically classified in the family Clavicipitaceae within the order Hypocreales. The classification was based on different morphological characteristics such as filiform ascospores and cylindrical asci. sister group with Tolypocladium, into Ophiocordycipitaceae. Fungi able to parasitize ants were also included in the transfer, such as Cordyceps unilateralis which was later renamed Ophiocordyceps unilateralis. Following this study, multiple traits such as the production of darkly pigmented, hard to flexible stromata were defined as characteristics of the family Ophiocordycipitaceae.

=== Ophiocordyceps unilateralis sensu lato ===
The fungus's scientific name is sometimes written as Ophiocordyceps unilateralis sensu lato, which means 'in the broad sense', because the species actually represents a complex of many species within O. unilateralis.

Support for this term has become increasingly important. In 2011, it was hypothesized that the zombie-ant fungus could actually be described as a complex of species which are host-specific, meaning that one O. unilateralis species can only successfully infect and manipulate one host ant species. There is a possibility that this resulted in or reinforced the reproductive isolation of the fungi, leading to its speciation. Following this, a study conducted in Brazil delimited, using morphological comparisons of the ascospores, germination processes, and asexual morphs, four different Ophiocordyceps species. Afterwards, three new species were described in the Brazilian Amazon, six in Thailand, and one in Japan.

More recently in 2018, 15 new O. unilateralis species were described based on classic taxonomic criteria, and macro-morphological data with a deeper focus on ascospore and asexual morphology. The asexual morphologies made it possible to distinguish two different clades mainly composed of species associated with ants which they termed "O. unilateralis core clade" and "O. kniphofioides subclade."

Further analyses were conducted using a set of different traits. Morphological traits were used and included both macro-morphological characters (e.g. typical single stroma arising from the host's dorsal pronotum, the ascoma (perithecia) growing from the stroma) and microscopic traits (e.g. the morphology of the ascospores in terms of size, shape, septation and germination). Moreover, other traits such as the host and the location of the death grip were added to the analyses. The morphological study led to 15 new identified species, with 14 which were distributed in the core clade, and one in the subclade. Moreover, it was found that species in the O. kniphofioides subclade specialise on neotropical ants, whereas species in the core clade specialise on Camponotini species.

Species within the O. unilateralis core clade as described in 2018:

- O. albacongiuae
- O. blakebarnesii
- O. camponoti-atricipis
- O. camponoti-balzani
- O. camponoti-bispinosi
- O. camponoti-chartificis
- O. camponoti-femorati
- O. camponoti-floridani
- O. camponoti-hippocrepidis
- O. camponoti-indiani
- O. camponoti-leonardi
- O. camponoti-melanotici
- O. camponoti-nidulantis
- O. camponoti-novogranadensis
- O. camponoti-renggeri
- O. camponoti-saundersi
- O. halabalaensis
- O. kimflemingiae
- O. naomipierceae
- O. ootakii
- O. polyrhachis-furcata
- O. pulvinata
- O. rami
- O. satoi

Species within the O. kniphofioides subclade as described in 2018:

- O. daceti
- O. kniphofioides

== Morphology ==
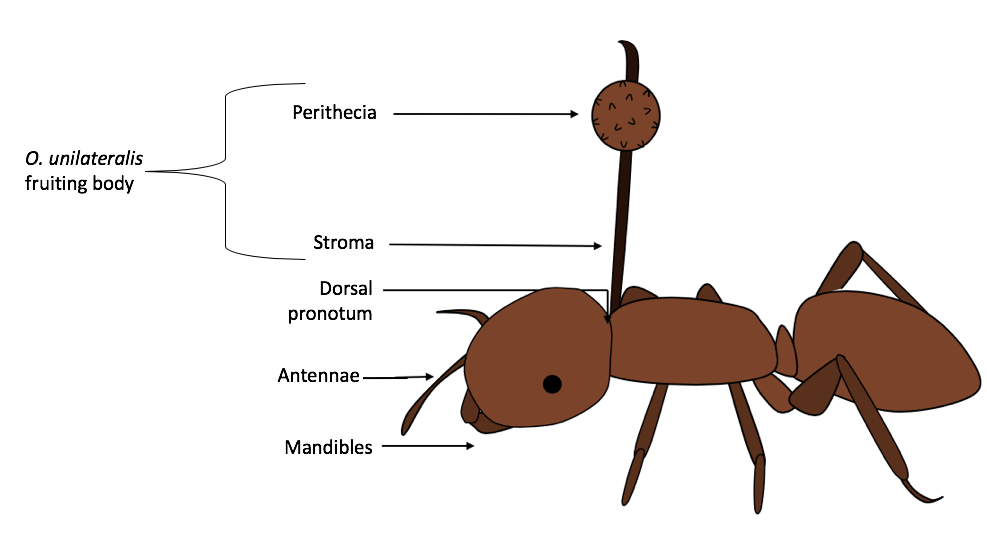
Schematic representation of Ophiocordyceps unilateralis growing out of an infected host ant

=== Typical morphology ===
The zombie-ant fungus is easily identifiable when its reproductive structure becomes apparent on its dead host, usually a carpenter ant. At the end of its life cycle, O. unilateralis typically generates a single, wiry yet pliant, darkly pigmented stroma which arises from the dorsal pronotum region of the ant once it is dead. Moreover, perithecia, the spore-bearing sexual structure, can be observed on the stalk, just below its tip. This complex forms the fungus' fruiting body.

Most species within the O. unilateralis s.l. species complex have both a sexual (teleomorph) and an asexual morph (anamorph). These are different in terms of their function and characteristics. Generally, the asexual morphs identified for Ophiocordyceps are Hirsutella and Hymenostilbe, two genera of asexually reproducing fungi.

=== Morphological variation ===
O. unilateralis species exhibit morphological variations which are most certainly due to their wide geographic range, from Japan to the Americas. Moreover, it has been hypothesized that their morphological variations may also be a result of one fungus species maximizing its infection on one specific host ant species (host-specific infections). Different subspecies of ant can occur within the same area, which means that in order to coexist they have to occupy different ecological niches. Consequently, the fungi may have evolved at the subspecies level in order to maximize its fitness.

==== O. unilateralis core clade morphological characteristics ====
The O. unilateralis core clade, as described in 2018, has distinct morphological characteristics. It exhibits a single stroma with a Hirsutella asexual morph, which arises from the dorsal neck region of the dead ant and produces a dark brown perithecia attached to its stalk. These species are also recognizable through the host species they infect, which are only Camponotini species. Once the host is killed by the fungus, it is commonly found fixed through their mandibles onto the surfaces of leaves.

==== O. kniphofioides subclade morphological characteristics ====
The O. kniphofioides subclade, as described in 2018, also has distinct morphological characteristics. Its species produce a stroma that grows laterally from the host's thorax which itself generates an orange ascoma. Moreover, species within this subclade share a Hirsutella asexual morph. As for the core clade, these species are also recognizable through the hosts they infect, which are usually neotropical ant species. The subclade does not present the same extended phenotype with the famous "death grip" that O. unilateralis species typically exhibit. Their hosts usually die at the base of large trees in the Amazonian rainforest, among the moss carpets.

== Life cycle ==
In tropical forests, the ant species Camponotus leonardi lives in the high canopy and has an extensive network of aerial trails. Sometimes the canopy gaps are too difficult to cross, so the ants' trails descend to the forest floor where they are exposed to O. unilateralis spores. The spores attach to their exoskeletons and eventually break through using mechanical pressure and enzymes. Like other fungi pathogenic to insects in the genus Ophiocordyceps, the fungus targets a specific host species, Camponotus leonardi; despite this, the fungus may parasitize other closely related species of ants with lesser degrees of host manipulation and reproductive success.

Yeast stages of the fungus spread in the ant's body and presumably produce compounds that affect the ant's hemocoel, using the evolutionary trait of an extended phenotype to manipulate the behavioral patterns exhibited by the ant. An infected ant exhibits irregularly timed full-body convulsions that dislodge it from its canopy nest to the forest floor.

The changes in the behavior of the infected ants are very specific, giving rise to the popular term "zombie ants." Behaviors are tuned for the benefit of the fungus in terms of its growth and its transmission, thereby increasing its fitness. The ant climbs up the stem of a plant and uses its mandibles with abnormal force to secure itself to a leaf vein, leaving dumbbell-shaped marks on it. The ants generally clamp to a leaf's vein at a height of 26 cm above the forest floor, on the northern side of the plant, in an environment with 94–95% humidity and temperatures between 20 and 30 °C (68 and 86 °F). Infections may lead to 20 to 30 dead ants per square meter. When the dead ants are moved to other places and positions, further vegetative growth and sporulation either fails to occur or results in undersized and abnormal reproductive structures. In temperate forests, the typical behavior of zombie ants is to attach themselves to the lower side of twigs, not leaves.

A search of plant-fossil databases revealed similar marks on a fossil leaf from the Messel Pit, which is 48 million years old. Once the mandibles of the ant are secured to the leaf vein, atrophy quickly sets in, destroying the sarcomere connections in the muscle fibers and reducing the mitochondria and sarcoplasmic reticular. The ant is no longer able to control the muscles of the mandible and remains fixed in place, hanging upside-down on the leaf. This lockjaw trait is popularly known as the death grip and is essential in the fungus's lifecycle. A study led in Thailand revealed that there is a synchronization of this manipulated biting behavior at solar noon.

The fungus then kills the ant and continues to grow as its hyphae invade more soft tissues and structurally fortify the ant's exoskeleton. More mycelia then sprout out of the ant, securely anchoring it to the plant substrate while secreting antimicrobials to ward off competition. When the fungus is ready to reproduce, its fruiting bodies grow from the ant's head and rupture, releasing the spores. This process takes 4–10 days. Dead ants are found in areas termed "graveyards" which contain high densities of dead ants previously infected by the same fungus.

The term "zombie ants" has been used in popular media as well as scientific articles, but has also been described as "catchy, yet misleading."

== Natural products ==
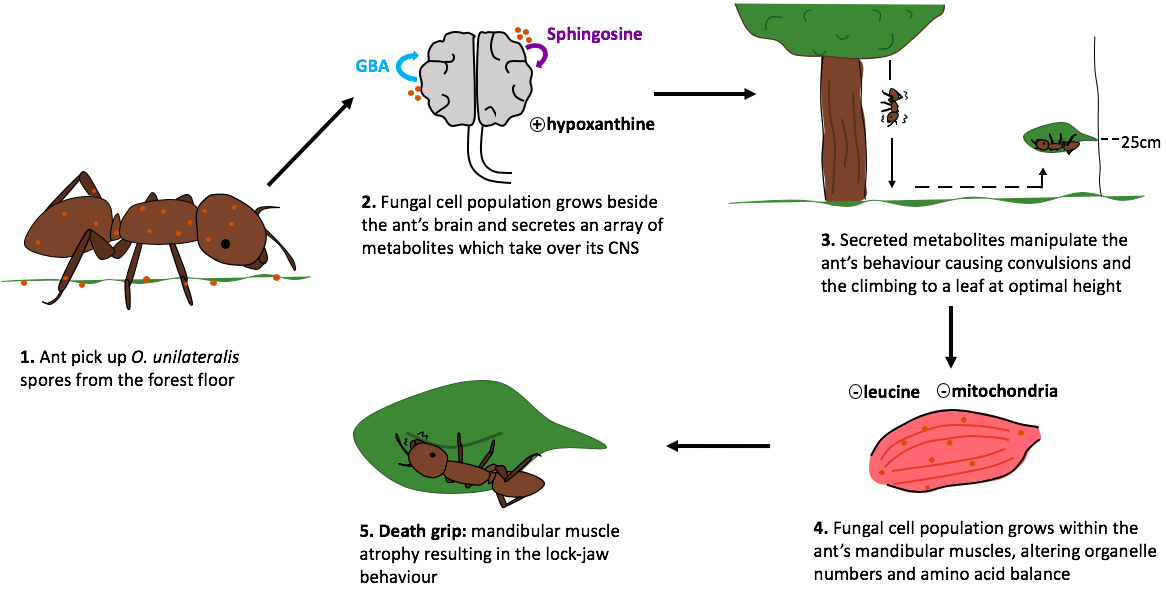
Schematic representation of the ant behavioral manipulation caused by natural products secreted by O. unilateralis

O. unilateralis' life cycle includes and depends on the infection and the manipulation of a carpenter ant, principally C. leonardi. The behavioral manipulation of the ant, which gives rise to the name "zombie-ant", is an extended phenotype of the fungus. It first affects the ant's behavior through convulsions that make it fall from its high canopy nest onto the forest floor. This is followed by the fungus controlling the climbing of the ant and the locking of its jaw (and subsequent death) onto a leaf around 25 centimetres above the ground, which is thought to be the optimal height for fungal spore growth and dispersion.

To survive, the fungal pathogen must attach securely to the arthropod exoskeleton and penetrate it—avoiding or suppressing host defenses—then, control the behavior of the host before killing it. Additionally, the fungal pathogen must protect the carcass from microbial and scavenger attack.

The behavioral manipulation of the ant would not be possible without the presence of huge fungal cell populations beside the host's brain and within muscles because these lead to the secretion of various metabolites known to have important behavioral consequences. During the infection the parasite comes across an array of environments such as different host tissues or the immune response. Studies have shown that O. unilateralis reacts heterogeneously by secreting different metabolites according to the host tissue it encounters and whether they are live or dead. The identification of these natural products is important in order to understand which aspects of the ants are under control and consequently how O. unilateralis manipulates the ant.

1. Attachment of O. unilateralis spores onto the ant's exoskeleton: The first step O. unilateralis has to overcome to have a successful infection is to attach itself onto the ant's cuticle and then infiltrate it. For this purpose, the fungus' hypha pierces the exoskeleton using enzymes such as chitinase, lipase and protease, combined with mechanical pressure.
2. Convulsions and climbing behavior: After the fungus enters the ant, it propagates, and fungal cells are found beside the host's brain. Once the population is of sufficient size, the fungus secretes compounds and takes over the central nervous system (CNS), which enables it to manipulate the ant to reach the forest floor and climb up the vegetation. Two candidate compounds, sphingosine and guanidinobutyric acid (GBA), have been identified as responsible for the manipulation of the host brain. Both compounds are known to be involved in various neurological disorders. However, more research is needed to determine whether other fungal metabolites interact with the host brain to cause higher levels of sphingosine and GBA. Some studies identified another compound, hypoxanthine, present at high extracellular concentrations. Hypoxanthine has deleterious effects on neural tissues of the cerebral cortex, which in the context of zombie ants may indicate a way for the fungus to alter the motor neurons of the ant, consequently affecting its behavior.
3. Death grip: The famous "death grip" exhibited by the ant is also a result of fungus-induced manipulation. This behavior consists of an infected ant locking its mandibles onto (i.e. biting) a leaf so tightly that the ant is prevented from falling as it dies hanging upside down, consequently enabling the proper growth of the fungus' fruiting body. This is possibly a result of the atrophy of the ant's mandibular muscles caused by the secretion of fungal compounds. In multiple studies, fungal cell populations were found within atrophied mandibular muscle tissues. These fungal cell populations have been found to be interconnected through anastomosing tubules. Researchers have proposed that these hyperconnected fungal networks may indicate cooperativity between fungal cells to control the actions of the ant's mandibular muscle. Another common hypothesis amongst researchers is that fungal cells infiltrate between the muscle fibers and then secrete chemicals which cause the muscles to atrophy. Significant decreases in leucine concentration and mitochondria number were identified in infected ants. A deficit in leucine results in the prevention of muscle regeneration because the amino acid is a nutrient regulator of muscle protein synthesis. A decrease in mitochondria ultimately results in a reduction of energy and calcium levels due to the lack of ATP and sarcoplasmic reticulum which provides calcium for actin–myosin binding which is essential for muscle cells.

More in-depth research is needed for the identification of other fungal compounds which act to atrophy the mandibular muscles, and for the understanding of their exact effects on the ant.

=== Natural products are host specific ===
Effects of O. unilateralis on the host have been found to vary according to host species. The ant species which are normally found infected in nature exhibit a manipulated behavior, whereas the species which are not typically infected are killed by the infection, but their behavior is not altered. This is likely due to the heterogeneous nature of the fungus which secretes different metabolites according to host species.

== Geographic distribution and first known appearance ==
Many studies describe Ophiocordyceps unilateralis distribution as pantropical since it occurs mainly in tropical forest ecosystems. However, there are some reports of the zombie-ant fungus in warm-temperate ecosystems.

Its distribution includes tropical rainforests located in Brazil, Australia and Thailand, and temperate forests found in South Carolina, Florida and Japan.

A 48-million-year-old fossil of a leaf stem exhibiting dumbbell-shaped marks characteristic of those made by an ant in the death-grip of Ophiocordyceps unilateralis was discovered in the Messel pit (Germany).

== Host effect ==
When O. unilateralis-infected ants die, they are mainly located in regions containing a high density of ants which were previously manipulated and killed. These areas are termed "graveyards" and can be of 20 to 30 metres (66 to 98 ft) in range, with a local density of dead ants possibly exceeding 25/m^{2} (2 per square foot; 21 per square yard).

The density of dead ants within these graveyards can vary according to climatic conditions. This means that environmental conditions such as humidity and temperature can influence O.unilateralis' effects on the host population. In fact, studies have described seasonal patterns in the density of previously infected dead ants, with an increase during the rainy season and a decrease during the dry season. It is thought that large precipitation events at the beginning and the end of the rainy season stimulates fungal development, which leads to more spores being released and ultimately more individuals being infected and killed.

== Pharmaceutical potential ==
Research on the related species Tolypocladium inflatum yielded the drug ciclosporin, an immunosuppressant used in organ donation. Similarly, a number of metabolites that are bioactive in humans have been identified in other entomopathogenic fungi such as in Massospora species.

Therefore, various secondary metabolites of O. unilateralis are being investigated for immunomodulatory, antitumor, hypoglycemic, and hypocholesterolemic effects.

=== Naphthoquinone derivatives ===
Naphthoquinone derivatives are an example of secondary metabolite with important pharmaceutical potentials produced by O. unilateralis. Six known naphthoquinone derivatives have been isolated from O. unilateralis, namely erythrostominone, deoxyerythrostominone, 4-O-methyl erythrostominone, epierythrostominol, deoxyerythrostominol, and 3,5,8-trihydroxy-6-methoxy-2-(5-oxohexa-1,3-dienyl)-1,4-naphthoquinone, which have shown activity in in vitro assays related to antimalarial drug discovery. In addition to having antimalarial activities, all six of these secondary metabolites have been demonstrated to have anticancer and antibacterial activities.

Moreover, the use of red naphthoquinone pigments produced by O. unilateralis has been studied as a dye for food, cosmetic, and pharmaceutical manufacturing processes. In fact, naphthoquinone derivatives produced by the fungus show a red color under acidic conditions, and a purple color under basic conditions. These pigments are stable against acid/alkaline conditions and light and are not cytotoxic, which makes them applicable for food coloring and as a dye for other materials. These attributes also make it a prime candidate for antituberculosis testing in secondary TB patients, by improving symptoms and enhancing immunity when combined with chemotherapeutic drugs.

=== Polyketides ===
In 2009, a study showed that O. unilateralis also produces polyketides. These secondary metabolites have been used in antibiotics such as patulin, cholesterol medication such as compactin, and antifungal treatments. It has also been reported that polyketides have other therapeutic effects such as antitumor, antioxidant and antiaging activities.

== Fungal hyperparasite ==
O. unilateralis suffers from the fungal hyperparasites Niveomyces coronatus and Torrubiellomyces zombiae, reported in the lay press as "antizombie-fungus fungi". These hyperparasites result fewer sporangia being viable, limiting the spread of O. unilateralis and the damage it inflicts on ant colonies. The hyperparasites move in to attack O. unilateralis as the fungal stalk emerges from the ant's body, which can stop the stalk from releasing its spores.

The graveyards of dead ants are numerous and spread throughout the surrounding area of the colony. Though O. unilateralis is very virulent, only about 6.5% of all fruiting bodies are viable spore producers. This is caused by the weakening of the fungus by the hyperparasite, which may limit the viability of infectious spores. Ants also groom each other to combat microscopic organisms that could potentially harm the colony. Additional fungi also grant beneficial assistance to the colony.

== Parasite adaptation ==
In host–parasite dynamics, both the host and the parasite are under selective pressure: the parasite evolves to increase its transmission, whereas the host evolves to avoid and/or resist the infection by the parasite.

=== Extended phenotype ===
Some parasites have evolved to manipulate their host's behavior in order to increase their transmission to uninfected susceptible individuals, thereby increasing their fitness. This host manipulation is termed the "extended phenotype" of the parasite and is a form of adaptation. Host ant manipulation by O. unilateralis represents one of the best-known examples of extended phenotypes.

The extended phenotype of O. unilateralis typically depicts the infected ant leaving its canopy nest and its normal foraging path to reach the forest floor and subsequently climbs to around 25 centimetres (9.8 in) above ground level, a height that is considered optimal for fungal growth due to its humidity level and temperature. This is followed by a "death grip" of the infected ant once it has reached a location with optimal conditions for post-mortem fungal development. This leads to the fungus continuing its growth and releasing fungal spores onto the forest floor. These spores will then be encountered by the ants which, when the aerial foraging route is not possible, have to occasionally descend to ground level. Therefore, O. unilateralis controls the ant's behavior and this manipulation represents an adaptation for the fungus where natural selection acts on its genes, increasing the fungus' fitness.

=== Somatic investment ===
Some studies proposed a theory in which O. unilateralis has another possible form of adaptation which ensures its repeated reproduction. This would be crucial for O. unilateralis s.l. species as they can produce and release within the air, clear and thin-walled spores which are susceptible to environmental conditions such as UV radiation and dryness.

In fact, studies suggest that the short viability of the fungal spores lead to the need of somatic investment (growth/survival) by the parasite in order to sustain the growth of the fungus' fruiting body on its host, thereby enabling successive reproduction. To do so, O. unilateralis fortifies the ant cadaver to prevent its decay, which consequently ensures the growth of the fruiting body. Therefore, the zombie-ant fungus adapts to the short viability of its spores by increasing their production using the dead ant.

== Host adaptation ==
The principal hosts of O. unilateralis evolved adaptive behaviors able to limit the contact rate between uninfected susceptible hosts and infected hosts, thereby reducing the risk of transmission.

O.unilateralis' principal hosts evolved efficient behavioral forms of social immunity. The ants clean each other's exoskeletons to decrease the presence of spores attached. Also, ants can sense that a member of the colony is infected; healthy ants carry the O. unilateralis-infected individual far away from the colony to avoid exposure to spores. There are also reports that most worker ants remain inside the nest boundaries; this would mean only foragers were at risk of infection.

Moreover, one of the fungus' principal hosts, Camponotus leonardi, provided evidence for the avoidance of the forest floor by the host ants as a defence method. In areas where O. unilateralis is present, C. leonardi builds its nests high in the canopy, and has a broad network of aerial trails. These trails occasionally move down to the ground level, where infection and graveyards occur, due to canopy gaps too difficult for the ants to cross. When the trails descend to the forest floor, their length is only of three to five meters before going back up into the canopy. This demonstrates the avoidance of the zones of infection by the ants. Additionally, more evidence participates in the favour of this defence method being adaptive as it is not observed in undisturbed forests where the zombie-ant fungus is not present.

== In fiction ==
In the video game series The Last of Us, Ophiocordyceps unilateralis has evolved to infect humans, thus creating zombie-like enemies in the game. Also, in episode two of the 2023 television series The Last of Us on HBO Max, Ophiocordyceps unilateralis is revealed to be the primary cause of the infected outbreak and subsequent collapse of human civilization. In the show, the fungus, having adapted to higher temperatures due to climate change, takes control of humans (as opposed to insects) as an alternative host and causes them to exhibit erratic behaviors, such as the desire to attack and infect non-infected humans. Craig Mazin, who co-wrote and produced the series, said that everything the series suggests fungi do, they have done forever in real life.

In the 2014 novel The Girl with All the Gifts, its 2016 film adaptation and its prequel novel entitled The Boy on the Bridge, all written by M. R. Carey, a strain of Ophiocordyceps unilateralis is similarly able to infect the human population through exchange of bodily fluids, leading to an apocalyptic world inhabited by zombie-like "hungries" who attack non-infected.

The novel The Genius Plague by David Walton, though not about this species specifically, expands on the idea of fungi influencing animals with a fungus that invades human brains and influences their actions toward its advantage.

The video game Cult of the Lamb features an ant character named Sozo who is implied to be under the influence of a parasitic fungus similar in nature to Ophiocordyceps unilateralis. A mushroom grows out of his head, causing him to act erratically and obsess over hallucinogenic mushrooms. Upon returning to his lair after completing his quest line, the player finds him dead on the ground, with the fungus on his head split in two to spread its spores.

The video game Grounded by Obsidian Entertainment has a similar type of fungal infection, known as "Fungal Growth", that portrays a few of Ophiocordyceps unilateralis' behaviors. The fungal infection can be seen growing through the bodies of infected insects, making them faster, stronger and extremely aggressive, even among normally passive creatures. It is also extremely volatile, seen to explode in a fashion often weaponized by infected enemies.

The creatures in the 2021 South African horror film Gaia are also inspired by Ophiocordyceps unilateralis.

== See also ==
- Massospora cicadina
