= Ophiocordyceps camponoti-balzani =

Scientific classification
- Kingdom: Fungi
- Division: Ascomycota
- Class: Sordariomycetes
- Order: Hypocreales
- Family: Ophiocordycipitaceae
- Genus: Ophiocordyceps
- Species: O. camponoti-balzani

Binomial name
- Ophiocordyceps camponoti-balzani Evans, Elliot and Hughes, 2011

Species of fungus

Ophiocordyceps camponoti-balzani is a species of fungus that parasitizes insect hosts of the order Hymenoptera, primarily ants. It was first isolated from Viçosa, Minas Gerais (Atlantic Forest), on Camponotus balzani. This species was formerly thought to be Ophiocordyceps unilateralis, which has subsequently been divided into four species. O. camponoti-balzani infects ants, and eventually kills the hosts after they move to an ideal location for the fungus to spread its spores. This has earned the species names such as "zombie fungus", given the fungus has been observed to cause its hosts to bite hard into the substrate it stands on, so that the fungus can then stably grow.

== Description ==
This species mycelium is a chocolate brown colour, and forms aggregations around the insects' joints, especially on legs and antennae. Its stromatal morphology is similar to O. camponoti-rufipedis, but its fertile region is dark brown when mature. Its ascomata are semi-erumpent and flask-shaped, measuring up to 200 millimetres (7.9 in), and possessing a pronounced neck.

Its asci are 8-spored, hyaline and cylindrical, while its ascospores are multiserriate, thin-walled and rounded at their bases.
