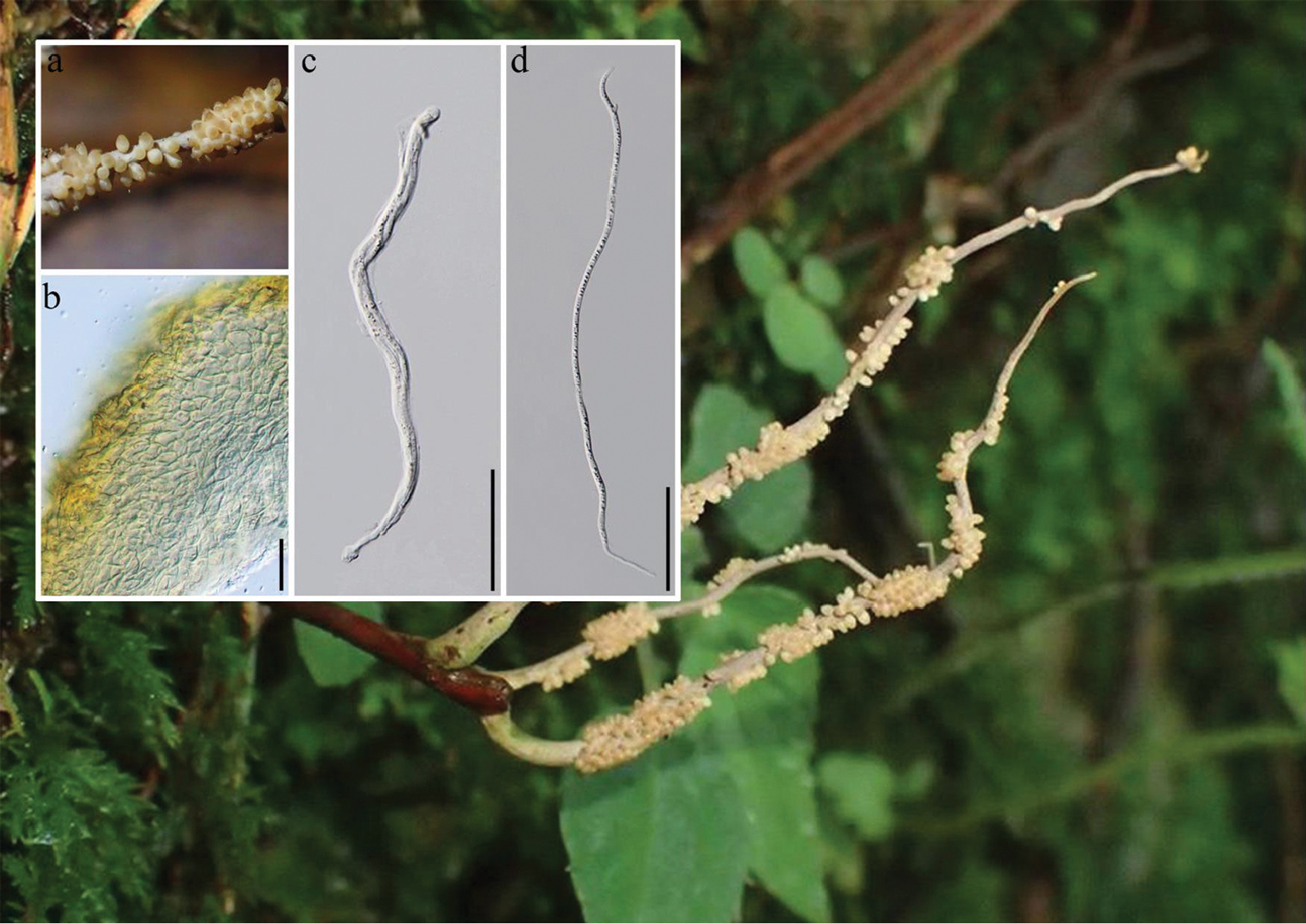

Scientific classification
- Domain: Eukaryota
- Kingdom: Fungi
- Division: Ascomycota
- Class: Sordariomycetes
- Order: Hypocreales
- Family: Ophiocordycipitaceae
- Genus: Ophiocordyceps
- Species: O. macroacicularis

Binomial name
- Ophiocordyceps macroacicularis Ban, Sakane & Nakagiri, 2014

= Ophiocordyceps macroacicularis =

Species of fungus

Ophiocordyceps macroacicularis is an entomopathogenic fungus belonging to the order Hypocreales (Ascomycota) in the family Ophiocordycipitaceae, which parasitize moth larvae. It produces superficial, oval perithecia at the apex of its stroma, and also multiseptate ascospores, while producing Hirsutella-type anamorphs on growth culture media. They are particularly distinguished by the size and shape of their stromata.
