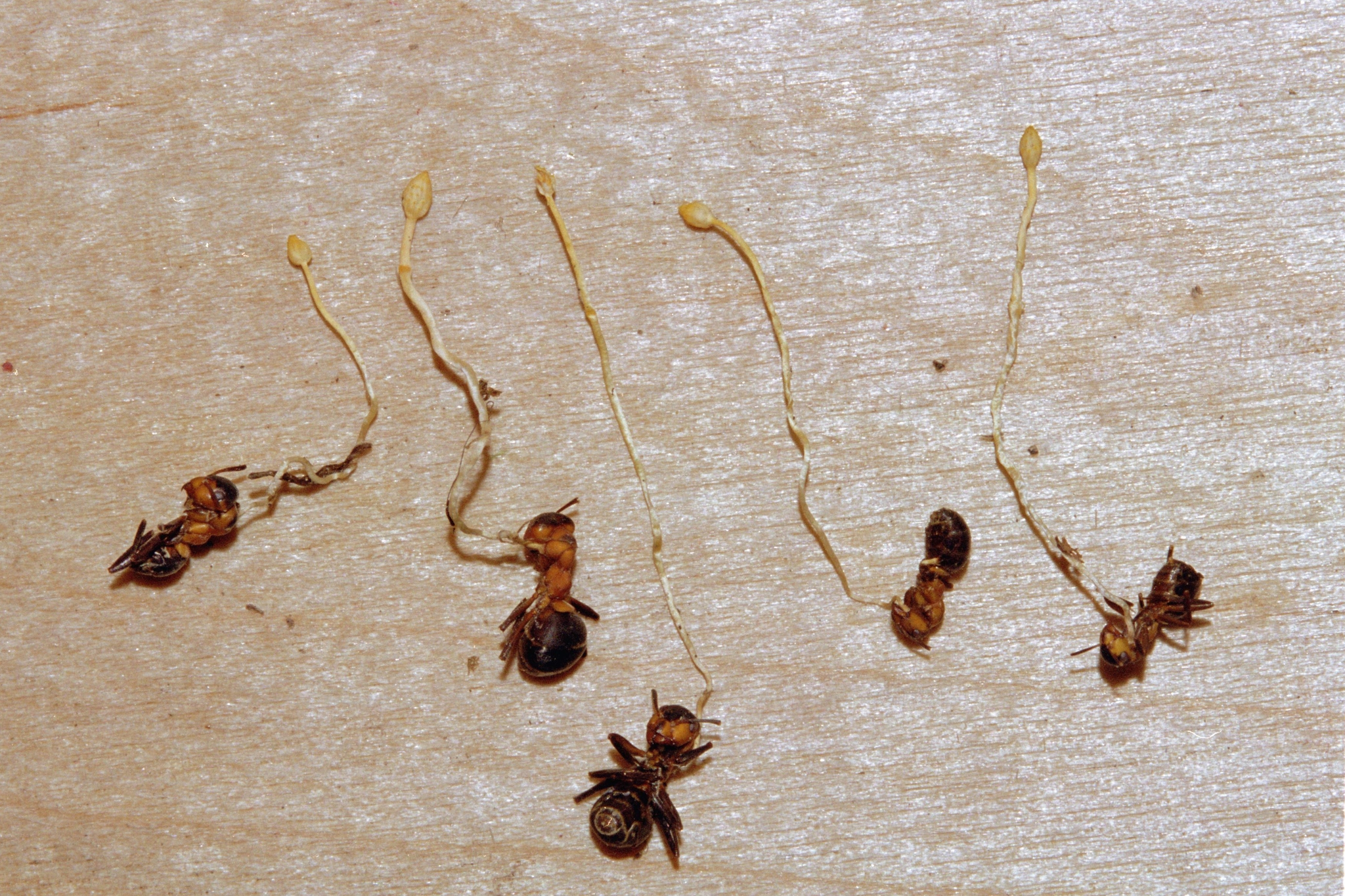

Scientific classification
- Kingdom: Fungi
- Division: Ascomycota
- Class: Sordariomycetes
- Order: Hypocreales
- Family: Ophiocordycipitaceae
- Genus: Ophiocordyceps
- Species: O. myrmecophila

Binomial name
- Ophiocordyceps myrmecophila (Ces.) G.H. Sung, J.M. Sung, Hywel-Jones & Spatafora

Synonyms
- Cordyceps myrmecophila Ces.; Torrubia myrmecophila (Ces.) Tul. & C. Tul.

= Ophiocordyceps myrmecophila =

Species of fungus

Ophiocordyceps myrmecophila, commonly known as the ant fungus or ant eater, is a species of fungus that parasitizes insect hosts, in particular members of the order Hymenoptera.

== Phylogeny ==
The new genus was separated recently from an 'outdated' entomopathogenic genus, Cordyceps, due to DNA analysis and phylogenetic differences in stromata and apices.

== Description ==
The ochraceous fruiting body, rising from an ant (which is sometimes buried), is up to 8 millimetres (3/8 in) wide and 9.5 centimetres (3 3/4 in) long.

== Distribution and habitat ==
Ophiocordyceps myrmecophila has been noted as one of the more dominant entomopathogenic fungi of formicine ants in the tropical rainforests of Thailand. This species and others like it can parasitize multiple arthropod hosts. Although entomopathogenic fungi have been identified as a widespread organism, tending obviously to be found in similar habitats to that of their arthropod host; ubiquity of the host, as well as evolutionary cospeciation are key factors of host specificity and therefore location.
