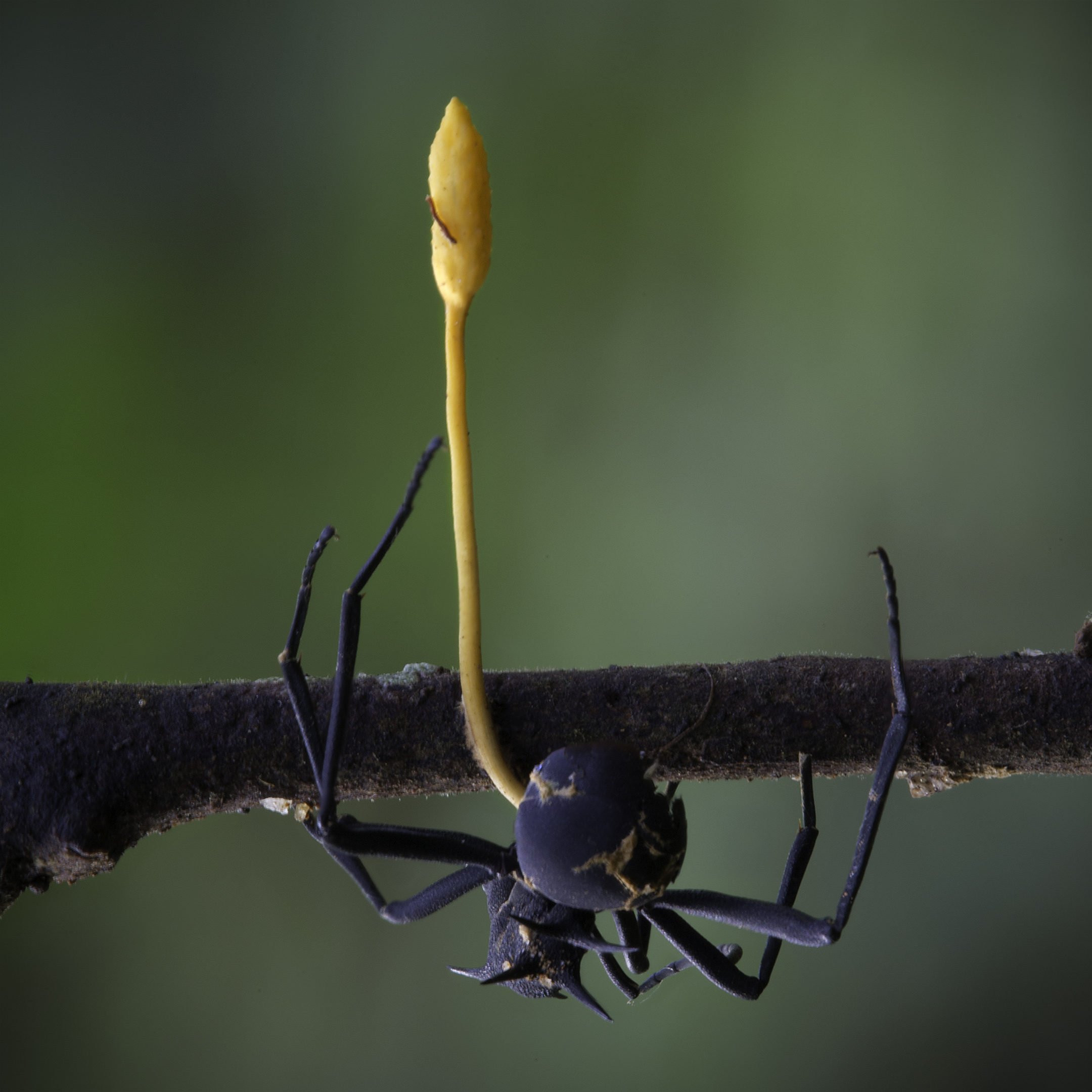
- Ophiocordyceps formicarum on an arthropod in Chiang Mai, Thailand-

Scientific classification
- Kingdom: Fungi
- Division: Ascomycota
- Class: Sordariomycetes
- Order: Hypocreales
- Family: Ophiocordycipitaceae
- Genus: Ophiocordyceps
- Species: O. formicarum

Binomial name
- Ophiocordyceps formicarum (Kobayasi) G.H.Sung, J.M.Sung, Hywel-Jones & Spatafora (2007)

Synonyms
- Cordyceps formicarum Kobayasi (1939)

= Ophiocordyceps formicarum =

Species of fungus

Ophiocordyceps formicarum is an entomopathogenic fungus belonging to the order Hypocreales (Ascomycota) in the family Ophiocordycipitaceae. The fungus was first described by mycologist George S. Kobayashi in 1939 as a species of Cordyceps. Originally found in Japan growing on an adult Hercules ant (Camponotus herculeanus var. obscuripes), it was reported from Guizhou, China, in 2003. It was transferred to the new genus Ophiocordyceps in 2007 when the family Cordycipitaceae was reorganized. A technique has been developed to grow the fungus in an agar growth medium supplemented with yeast extract, inosine, and glucose.
