= Ophiocordyceps arborescens =

Scientific classification
- Domain: Eukaryota
- Kingdom: Fungi
- Division: Ascomycota
- Class: Sordariomycetes
- Order: Hypocreales
- Family: Ophiocordycipitaceae
- Genus: Ophiocordyceps
- Species: O. arborescens

Binomial name
- Ophiocordyceps arborescens Ban, Sakane & Nakagiri, 2014

Species of fungus

Ophiocordyceps arborescens is an entomopathogenic fungus belonging to the order Hypocreales (Ascomycota) in the family Ophiocordycipitaceae. It produces superficial, oval perithecia at the apex of its stroma, and also multiseptate ascospores, while producing Hirsutella-type anamorphs on growth culture media. They are particularly distinguished by the shape and size of their stroma.
