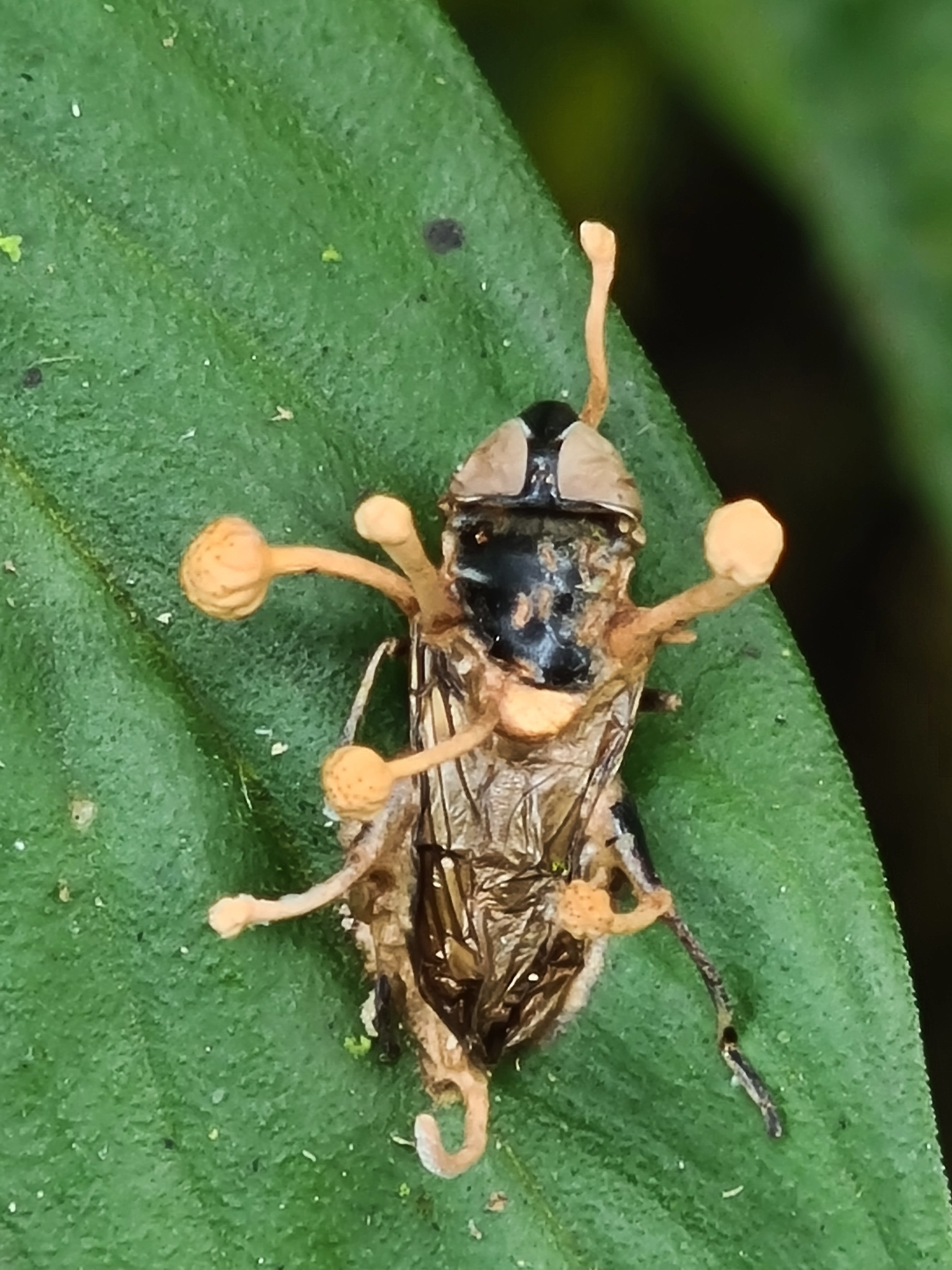

Scientific classification
- Kingdom: Fungi
- Division: Ascomycota
- Class: Sordariomycetes
- Order: Hypocreales
- Family: Ophiocordycipitaceae
- Genus: Ophiocordyceps
- Species: O. dipterigena

Binomial name
- Ophiocordyceps dipterigena (Berk. & Broome) G.H.Sung, J.M.Sung, Hywel-Jones & Spatafora

Synonyms
- Cordyceps dipterigena Berk. & Broome (1873); Cordyceps muscicola Möller (1901); Cordyceps surinamensis Henn. (1902); Cordyceps oumensis Höhn. (1909); Cordyceps thwaitesii Lloyd (1921); Cordyceps opposita Syd. (1922); Hymenostilbe dipterigena Petch (1931)

= Ophiocordyceps dipterigena =

Species of fungus

Ophiocordyceps dipterigena is an entomopathogenic fungi species from the genus Ophiocordyceps. This species was originally described in 1873 as Cordyceps dipterigena.

== Description ==
Other entomopathogenic fungi manipulate their hosts by making the fly look for the part of the plant where the stem is, and then the fly hangs itself by its legs. This hanging behavior seems to help the fungus grow and develop. O. dipterigena manipulates its host to land on a leaf without needing to hang itself. In this particular species, once the fly dies, a part of the fungus grows out from inside the insect through its head, resembling its antennae. The stroma of O. dipterigena is yellow.

== Biomedical role ==
Ophiocordyceps dipterigena provide a source for β-glucans.

== Ecology ==
Ophiocordyceps dipterigena might be considered as a potential candidate for the biological control of Agromyzid flies, opening new possibilities for the use of entomopathogenic fungi in biological control programs.
