= Ophiocordyceps camponoti-melanotici =

Scientific classification
- Kingdom: Fungi
- Division: Ascomycota
- Class: Sordariomycetes
- Order: Hypocreales
- Family: Ophiocordycipitaceae
- Genus: Ophiocordyceps
- Species: O. camponoti-melanotici

Binomial name
- Ophiocordyceps camponoti-melanotici Evans, Elliot and Hughes, 2011

Species of fungus

Ophiocordyceps camponoti-melanotici is a species of fungus that parasitizes insect hosts, in particular members of the order Hymenoptera. It was first isolated from Viçosa, Minas Gerais, on Camponotus melanoticus.

== Description ==
This species' mycelium is a dark brown colour, and is quite sparse. Its stromatal morphology is similar to O. camponoti-rufipedis. Its fertile area is also a dark brown colour, measuring up to 1.0mm. Its ascomata are semi-erumpent and flask-shaped, with a prominent neck. Its asci possesses 8 spores, the apical cap measuring up to 8 millimetres (0.31 in). The ascospores are hyaline and thin-walled.
