= Ophiocordyceps camponoti-novogranadensis =

Scientific classification
- Kingdom: Fungi
- Division: Ascomycota
- Class: Sordariomycetes
- Order: Hypocreales
- Family: Ophiocordycipitaceae
- Genus: Ophiocordyceps
- Species: O. camponoti-novogranadensis

Binomial name
- Ophiocordyceps camponoti-novogranadensis Evans, Elliot and Hughes, 2011

Species of fungus

Ophiocordyceps camponoti-novogranadensis is a species of fungus that parasitizes insect hosts, in particular members of the order Hymenoptera. It was first isolated from Parque Estadual de Itacolomi in Ouro Preto, at an altitude of 1,000 metres (3,300 ft), on Camponotus novogranadensis.

== Description ==
Its mycelium is a chocolate brown colour, and is especially dense around its feet, forming distinctive pads. Its stromatal morphology is the same as O. camponotirufipedis. Its fertile region is brown, its ascomata being semi-erumpent and crowded. The asci are 8-spored, hyaline and cylindrical, with a prominent apical cap, while the ascospores are hyaline, thin-walled, and 5–10-septate.
