= Ophiocordyceps coenomyia =

Scientific classification
- Domain: Eukaryota
- Kingdom: Fungi
- Division: Ascomycota
- Class: Sordariomycetes
- Order: Hypocreales
- Family: Ophiocordycipitaceae
- Genus: Ophiocordyceps
- Species: O. coenomyia

Binomial name
- Ophiocordyceps coenomyia Ban, Sakane & Nakagiri, 2014

Species of fungus

Ophiocordyceps coenomyia is an entomopathogenic fungus belonging to the order Hypocreales (Ascomycota) in the family Ophiocordycipitaceae. It is parasitic to awl-fly larvae. This species is characterized by a globose, alutaceous fertile part at the apex of its light yellow stroma, its immersed perithecia, and ascospores dividing in turn into partspores. The species is closely related to O. heteropoda.
