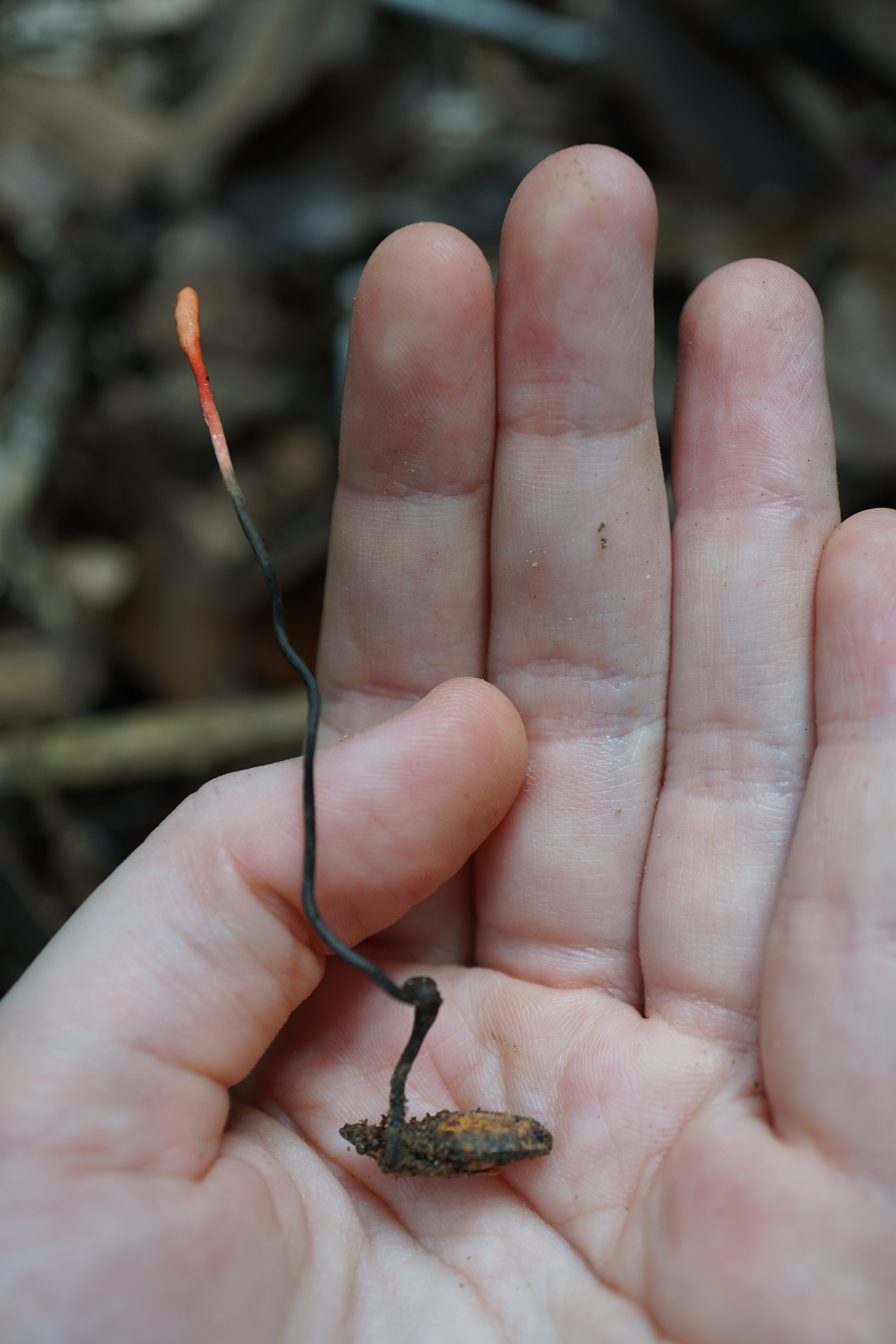
- Ophiocordyceps nutans in the Sakaerat Biosphere Reserve, Thailand

Scientific classification
- Kingdom: Fungi
- Division: Ascomycota
- Class: Sordariomycetes
- Order: Hypocreales
- Family: Ophiocordycipitaceae
- Genus: Ophiocordyceps
- Species: O. nutans

Binomial name
- Ophiocordyceps nutans (Pat.)

Synonyms
- Cordyceps nutans Pat., Bull. 1887; Cordyceps bicephala subsp. nutans (Pat.) Moureau 1949

= Ophiocordyceps nutans =

Species of fungus

Ophiocordyceps nutans is an entomopathogenic fungus belonging to the order Hypocreales (Ascomycota) in the family Ophiocordycipitaceae. O. nutans only parasitizes Hemipterans, namely stinkbugs. In Korea, O. nutans is one of the most common species of Cordyceps. O. nutans, as well as other Cordyceps species, are mainly classified morphologically by their colour, fruit body shape, and host insect species. Stinkbugs cause considerable damage to agriculture and forestry, and the anamorph of O. nutans, Hymenostilbe nutans, is a potential selective biological control agent against the stinkbugs.

== Distribution ==
Ophiocordyceps nutans is found in the tropical forest regions of Japan, Taiwan, China, New Guinea, and Korea, as well as other places.
