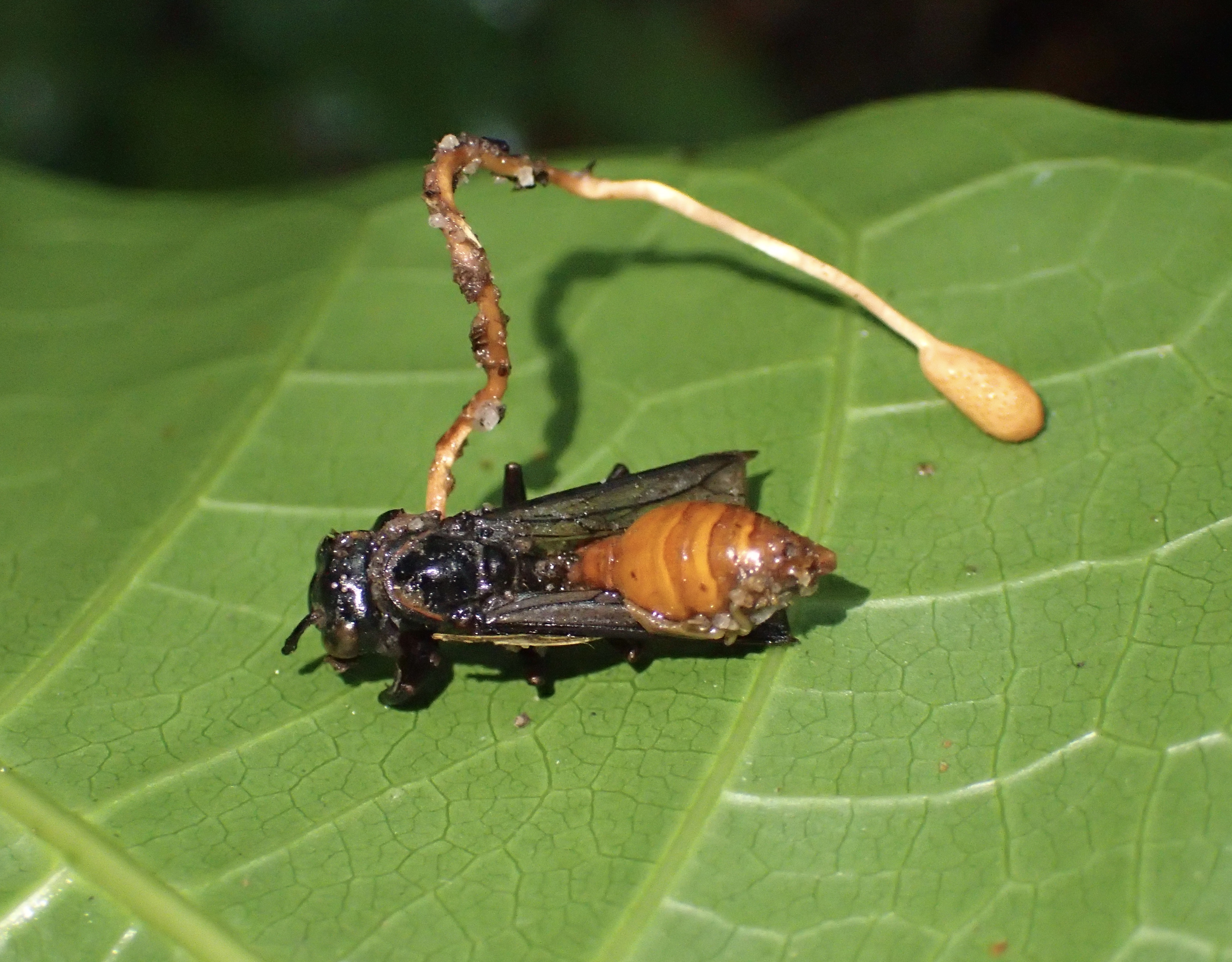

Scientific classification
- Kingdom: Fungi
- Division: Ascomycota
- Class: Sordariomycetes
- Order: Hypocreales
- Family: Ophiocordycipitaceae
- Genus: Ophiocordyceps
- Species: O. sphecocephala

Binomial name
- Ophiocordyceps sphecocephala (Klotzsch ex Berk.) G.H. Sung, J.M. Sung, Hywel-Jones & Spatafora (2007)

Synonyms
- Cordyceps sphaecophila (Klotzsch ex Berk.) Berk. & M.A. Curtis (1868); Cordyceps sphecocephala (Klotzsch ex Berk.) Berk. & M.A. Curtis (1869); Sphaeria sphecocephala Klotzsch ex Berk. (1843); Torrubia sphecocephala (Klotzsch ex Berk.) Tul. & C. Tul. (1865)

= Ophiocordyceps sphecocephala =

Species of fungus

Ophiocordyceps sphecocephala is a species of insect-pathogenic fungus, meaning it grows within insects, particularly wasps of the genera Polistes, Tachytes, and Vespa. It has been reported across the Americas and China.

Physically, its stromata can be 2–10 cm long and form an egg-shaped head. It is typically cream or yellow in color.

The fungus may also have potential medical implications, including possible anti-asthmatic or anti-cancer properties.

After the fungus takes control of the insect, the host typically moves to an elevated location, where the fungus eventually sprouts from the body.

Studies have shown that a higher mycelial yield of Ophiocordyceps sphecocephala is produced in media containing organic nitrogen, while media lacking organic nitrogen result in lower mycelial growth. This indicates that the presence of organic nitrogen is essential for the growth of Ophiocordyceps sphecocephala.
