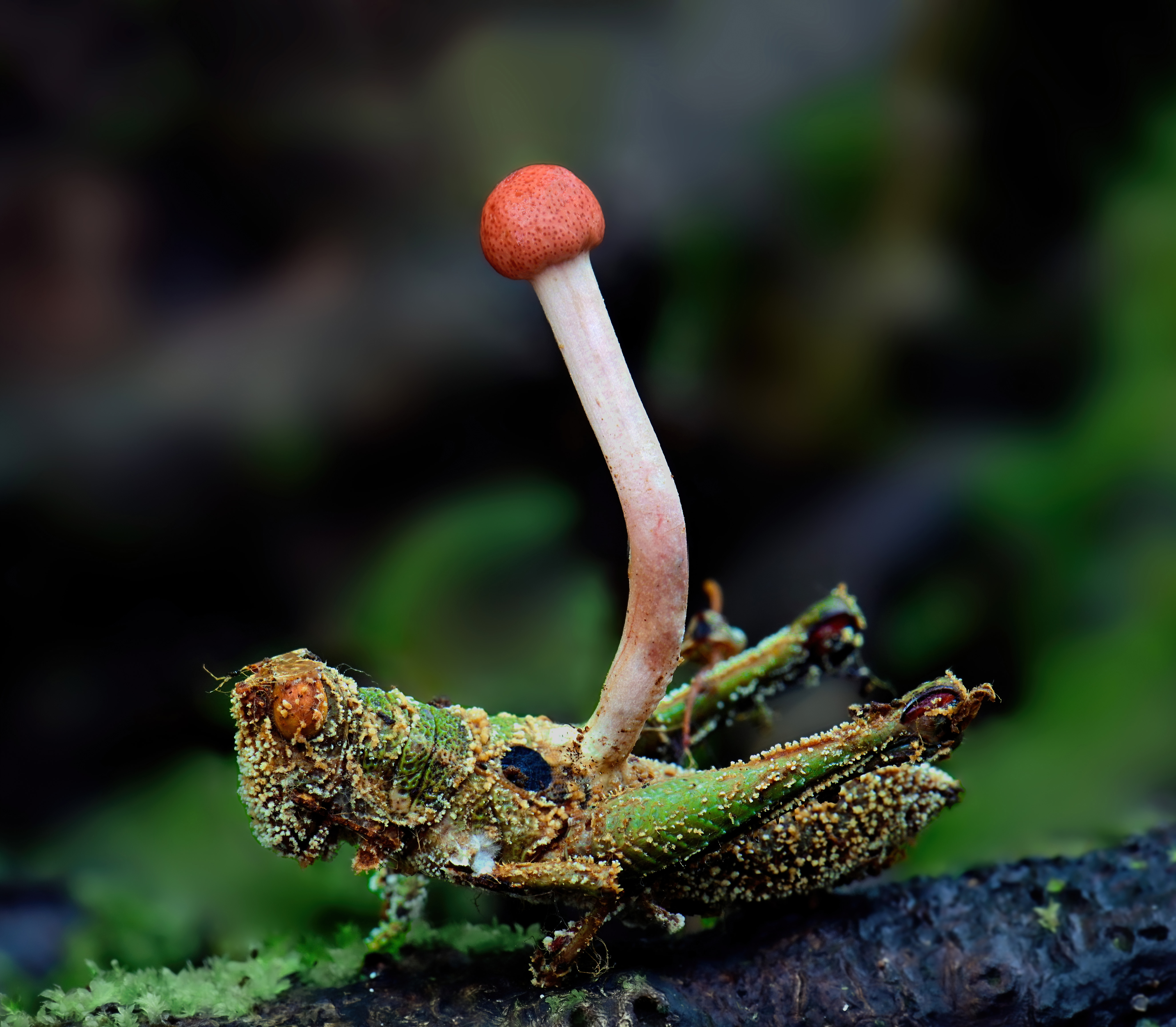
- Paraisaria amazonica

Scientific classification
- Kingdom: Fungi
- Division: Ascomycota
- Class: Sordariomycetes
- Order: Hypocreales
- Family: Ophiocordycipitaceae
- Genus: Paraisaria; Samson & B.L. Brady 1983

Species
- Paraisaria gracilioides Paraisaria myrmicarum

= Paraisaria =

Genus of fungi

Paraisaria is a genus of fungi in the Ophiocordycipitaceae family. Members are anamorph names of Ophiocordyceps.
