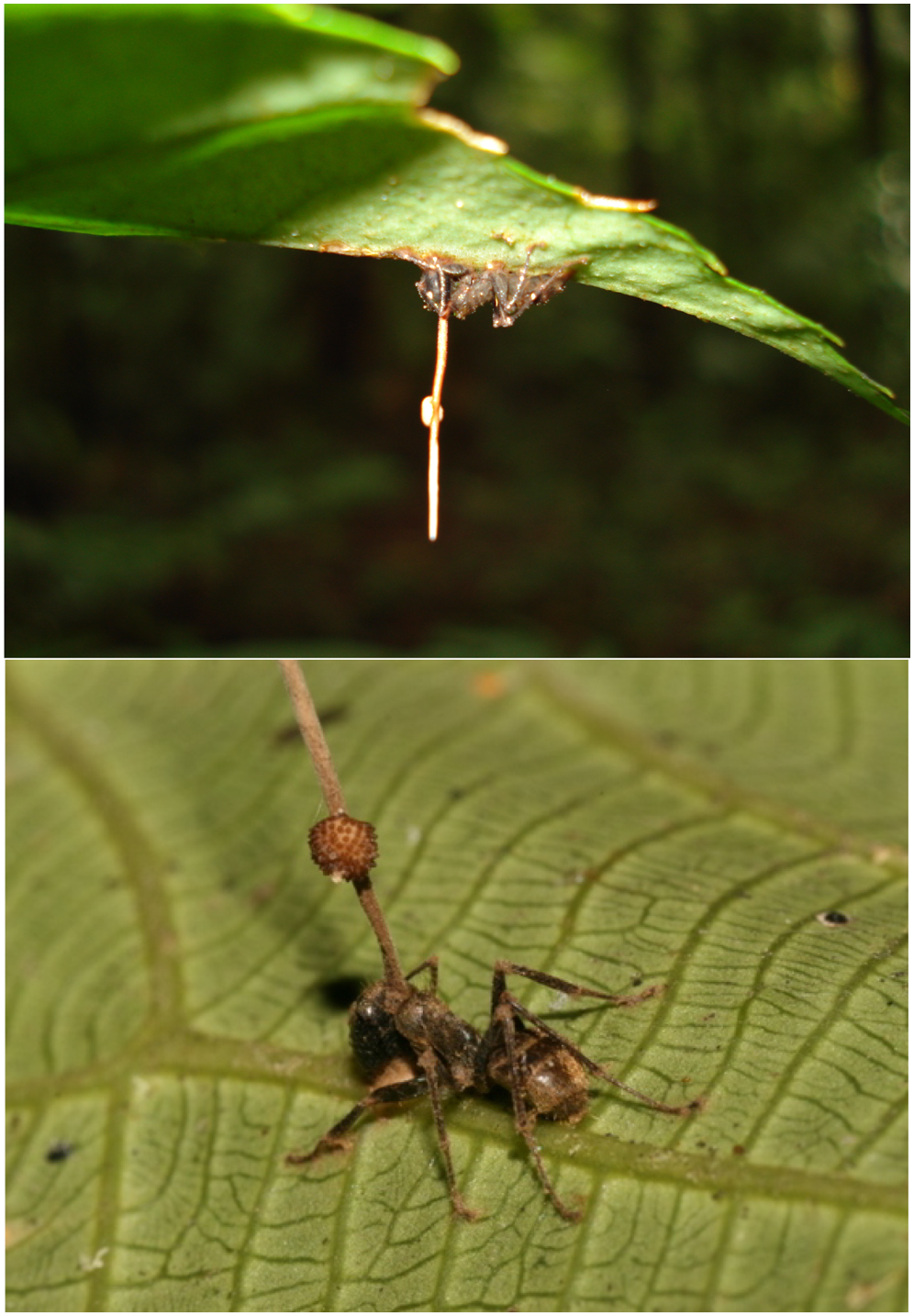
- Dead ants infected with Ophiocordyceps unilateralis

Scientific classification
- Kingdom: Fungi
- Division: Ascomycota
- Class: Sordariomycetes
- Order: Hypocreales
- Family: Ophiocordycipitaceae
- Genus: Ophiocordyceps; Petch (1931)

Type species
- Ophiocordyceps blattae (Petch) Petch (1931)

Synonyms
- List: Cordycepioideus Stifler (1941); Desmidiospora Thaxt. (1891); Papiliomyces Luangsa-ard, Samson & Thanakitp. (2020); Podonectrioides Kobayasi & Shimizu (1983); Syngliocladium Petch (1932)

= Ophiocordyceps =

Genus of fungi

Ophiocordyceps is a genus of fungi within the family Ophiocordycipitaceae. The widespread genus, first described scientifically by British mycologist Tom Petch in 1931, contains about 140 species that grow on insects. Anamorphic genera that correspond with Ophiocordyceps species are Hirsutella, Hymenostilbe, Isaria, Paraisaria, and Syngliocladium.

One species complex, Ophiocordyceps unilateralis, is known for its parasitism on ants, in which it alters the behavior of the ants in such a way as to propagate itself more effectively. The parasite starts on the ground and comes in contact with an ant, killing it and then growing its fruiting bodies from the ant's head and releasing its spores. To accomplish this, infected ants are stripped of their instinctive fear of heights, and leaving the relative safety of their nests, climb up the nearest plant—a syndrome known as "summit disease". The ant then clamps its jaws around the plant in a "death grip" and mycelia grow from the ant's feet and stitch them to the surface of the plant. The spores released from the ant carcass fall to the ground and infect other ants that come in contact with the spores so that this cycle continues. Areas with high densities of ants that have this fungus growing out of them are known as graveyards.

A 48-million-year-old fossil of an ant in the death-grip of Ophiocordyceps unilateralis was discovered in Germany.

Not all fungi of this genus are harmful to host insects. A few act as yeast-like symbioants of cicadas, having retired from the parasitic lifestyle of O. sobolifera to take on the role of the degraded Hodgkinia (bacterial) symbioant.

== Sources and uses ==
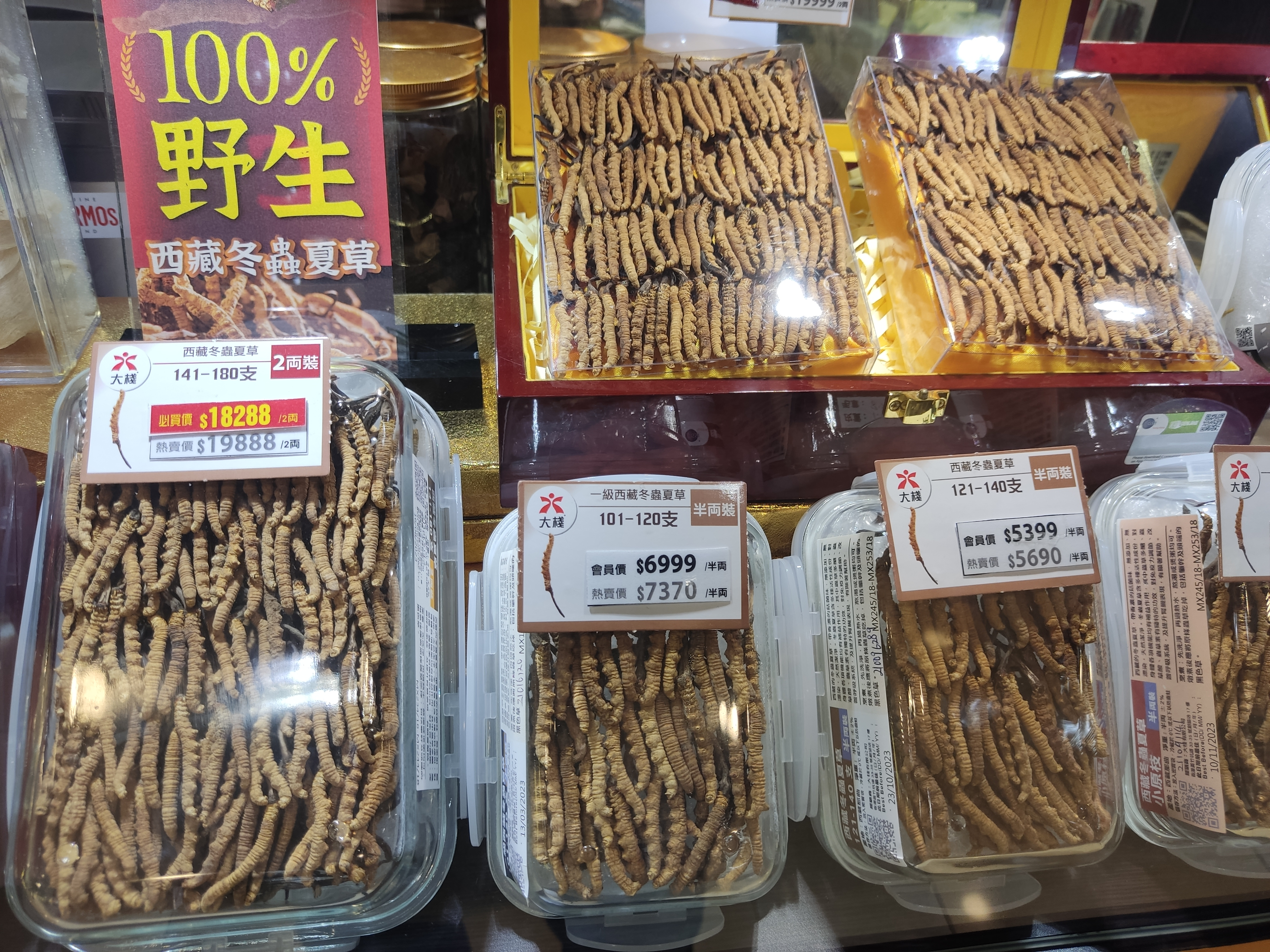
Moth larvae infested by Ophiocordyceps sinensis sold as herbal medicine

Ophiocordyceps sinensis is a species that infects the larvae of Tibetan ghost moths, and is used extensively in traditional Chinese medicine. There is currently no scientific evidence that use of this species has any clinically detectable effect on human diseases.

Ophiocordyceps robertsii is used by the Māori people of New Zealand as food and a source of ink for tattoos. The charred insect-fungus complex was mixed with tree sap to make an almost black ink.

Ophiocordyceps nutans in its anamorphic form Hymenostilbe nutans is used as a biological control for stinkbugs.

== Non-insect hosts ==
One not-yet-named fungus that falls into Ophiocordyceps infects juvenile edible crabs. Infection is fatal once the fungus becomes established in the hemocoel.

== Species ==
- Ophiocordyceps arborescens
- Ophiocordyceps acicularis
- Ophiocordyceps agriotidis
- Ophiocordyceps ainictos
- Ophiocordyceps amazonica
  - Ophiocordyceps amazonica var. neoamazonica
- Ophiocordyceps aphodii
- Ophiocordyceps appendiculata
- Ophiocordyceps arachneicola
- Ophiocordyceps araracuarensis
- Ophiocordyceps arbuscula
- Ophiocordyceps armeniaca
- Ophiocordyceps asyuënsis
- Ophiocordyceps aurantia
- Ophiocordyceps australis
- Ophiocordyceps barnesii
- Ophiocordyceps bicephala
- Ophiocordyceps brunneipunctata
- Ophiocordyceps bispora
- Ophiocordyceps blattae
- Ophiocordyceps blattarioides
- Ophiocordyceps caloceroides
- Ophiocordyceps camponoti-balzani
- Ophiocordyceps camponoti-chartificis
- Ophiocordyceps camponoti-floridani
- Ophiocordyceps camponoti-melanotici
- Ophiocordyceps camponoti-novogranadensis
- Ophiocordyceps camponoti-rufipedis
- Ophiocordyceps camponoti-sexguttati
- Ophiocordyceps cantharelloides
- Ophiocordyceps carabidicola
- Ophiocordyceps cicadicola
- Ophiocordyceps clavata
- Ophiocordyceps clavulata
- Ophiocordyceps coccidiicola
- Ophiocordyceps coccigena
- Ophiocordyceps cochlidiicola
- Ophiocordyceps coenomyia
- Ophiocordyceps communis
- Ophiocordyceps corallomyces
- Ophiocordyceps crassispora
- Ophiocordyceps crinalis
- Ophiocordyceps cuboidea
- Ophiocordyceps cucumispora
  - Ophiocordyceps cucumispora var. dolichoderi
- Ophiocordyceps curculionum
- Ophiocordyceps cylindrostromata
- Ophiocordyceps daceti
- Ophiocordyceps dayiensis
- Ophiocordyceps dermapterigena
- Ophiocordyceps dipterigena
- Ophiocordyceps discoideicapitata
- Ophiocordyceps ditmarii
- Ophiocordyceps dovei
- Ophiocordyceps elateridicola
- Ophiocordyceps elongata
- Ophiocordyceps elongatiperitheciata
- Ophiocordyceps elongatistromata
- Ophiocordyceps emeiensis
- Ophiocordyceps engleriana
- Ophiocordyceps entomorrhiza
- Ophiocordyceps evansii
- Ophiocordyceps evdogeorgiae
- Ophiocordyceps falcata
- Ophiocordyceps falcatoides
- Ophiocordyceps fasciculatistromata
- Ophiocordyceps ferruginosa
- Ophiocordyceps filiformis
- Ophiocordyceps formicarum
- Ophiocordyceps forquignonii
- Ophiocordyceps fulgoromorphila
- Ophiocordyceps furcicaudata
- Ophiocordyceps gansuënsis
- Ophiocordyceps geniculata
- Ophiocordyceps gentilis
- Ophiocordyceps glaziovii
- Ophiocordyceps goniophora
- Ophiocordyceps gracilioides
- Ophiocordyceps gracilis
- Ophiocordyceps gryllotalpae
- Ophiocordyceps halabalaensis
- Ophiocordyceps heteropoda
- Ophiocordyceps hirsutellae
- Ophiocordyceps hiugensis
- Ophiocordyceps huberiana
- Ophiocordyceps humbertii
- Ophiocordyceps indica
- Ophiocordyceps insignis
- Ophiocordyceps irangiensis
- Ophiocordyceps japonensis
- Ophiocordyceps jiangxiensis
- Ophiocordyceps jinggangshanensis
- Ophiocordyceps kangdingensis
- Ophiocordyceps kniphofioides
  - Ophiocordyceps kniphofioides var. dolichoderi
  - Ophiocordyceps kniphofioides var. monacidis
  - Ophiocordyceps kniphofioides var. ponerinarum
- Ophiocordyceps koningsbergeri
- Ophiocordyceps konnoana
- Ophiocordyceps lachnopoda
- Ophiocordyceps laojunshanensis
- Ophiocordyceps larvarum
- Ophiocordyceps larvicola
- Ophiocordyceps lloydii
  - Ophiocordyceps lloydii var. binata
- Ophiocordyceps longissima
- Ophiocordyceps lutea
- Ophiocordyceps macroacicularis
- Ophiocordyceps macularis
- Ophiocordyceps melolonthae
  - Ophiocordyceps melolonthae var. rickii
- Ophiocordyceps michiganensis
- Ophiocordyceps minutissima
- Ophiocordyceps monticola
- Ophiocordyceps mrciensis
- Ophiocordyceps multiaxialis
- Ophiocordyceps myrmecophila
- Ophiocordyceps myrmicarum
- Ophiocordyceps naomipierceae
- Ophiocordyceps neovolkiana
- Ophiocordyceps nepalensis
- Ophiocordyceps nigra
- Ophiocordyceps nigrella
- Ophiocordyceps nigripes
- Ophiocordyceps nutans
- Ophiocordyceps obtusa
- Ophiocordyceps octospora
- Ophiocordyceps odonatae
- Ophiocordyceps oecophyllae
- Ophiocordyceps osuzumontana
- Ophiocordyceps owariensis
  - Ophiocordyceps owariensis f. viridescens
- Ophiocordyceps oxycephala
- Ophiocordyceps paludosa
- Ophiocordyceps paracuboidea
- Ophiocordyceps pentatomae
- Ophiocordyceps petchii
- Ophiocordyceps proliferans
- Ophiocordyceps prolifica
- Ophiocordyceps pruinosa
- Ophiocordyceps pseudolloydii
- Ophiocordyceps pseudolongissima
- Ophiocordyceps pulvinata
- Ophiocordyceps purpureostromata
  - Ophiocordyceps purpureostromata f. recurvata
- Ophiocordyceps ravenelii
- Ophiocordyceps rhizoidea
- Ophiocordyceps ridleyi
- Ophiocordyceps robertsii - Vegetable caterpillar, āwheto
- Ophiocordyceps rubripunctata
- Ophiocordyceps rubiginosiperitheciata
- Ophiocordyceps ryogamiensis
- Ophiocordyceps salebrosa
- Ophiocordyceps salganeicola
- Ophiocordyceps satoi
- Ophiocordyceps scottiana
- Ophiocordyceps selkirkii
- Ophiocordyceps sichuanensis
- Ophiocordyceps smithii
- Ophiocordyceps sobolifera
- Ophiocordyceps sinensis—Caterpillar fungus, chong cao
- Ophiocordyceps sphecocephala
- Ophiocordyceps stipillata
- Ophiocordyceps stylophora
- Ophiocordyceps subflavida
- Ophiocordyceps subunilateralis
- Ophiocordyceps superficialis
  - Ophiocordyceps superficialis f. crustacea
- Ophiocordyceps takaoënsis
- Ophiocordyceps taylorii
- Ophiocordyceps thyrsoides
- Ophiocordyceps tiputini
- Ophiocordyceps tricentri
- Ophiocordyceps truncata
- Ophiocordyceps uchiyamae
- Ophiocordyceps unilateralis
  - Ophiocordyceps unilateralis var. clavata
- Ophiocordyceps variabilis
- Ophiocordyceps voeltzkowii
- Ophiocordyceps volkiana
- Ophiocordyceps wuyishanensis
- Ophiocordyceps yakusimensis
- Ophiocordyceps zhangjiajiensis

== Phylogeny ==
A relatively broad phylogeny of the genus was published in 2024 as part of the effort to distinguish more species from inside the O. sinensis complex.

== In popular culture ==
Simply referred to as "cordyceps", an unspecified species in this genus is the cause of a worldwide pandemic and the zombie-like "infected" in the 2013 video game The Last of Us, its 2020 sequel, and the 2023 television adaptation.

In the 2014 novel The Girl with All the Gifts and its 2016 film adaptation, a mutation of Ophiocordyceps unilateralis is responsible for an infection that causes the collapse of civilization.

In the 2022 comic-book series Poison Ivy written by G. Willow Wilson, the titular character makes use of a fictitious species belonging to this genus.

The Pokémon Paras and Parasect are based on insects parasitized by Ophiocordyceps.

== See also ==
- Cordyceps
