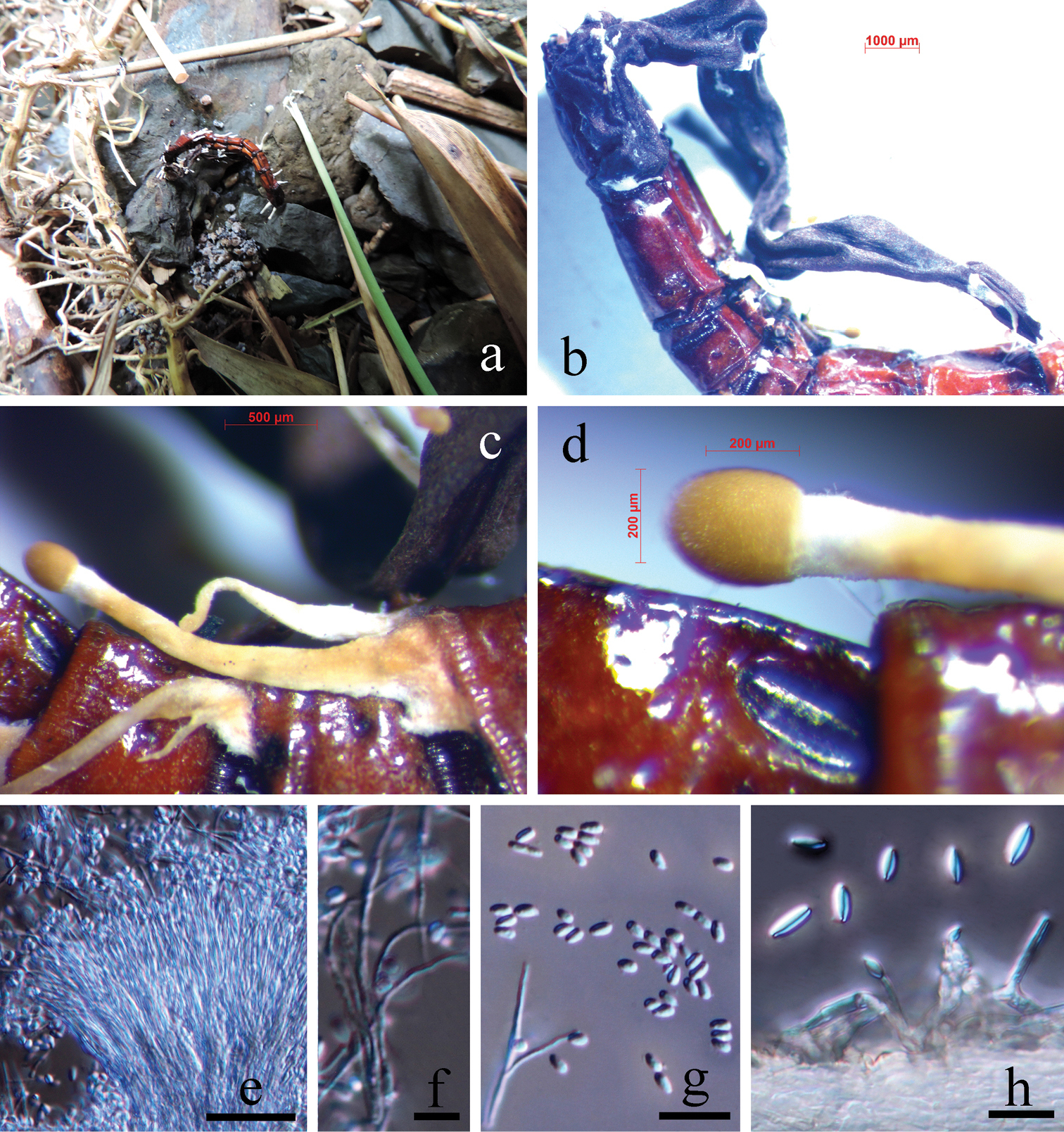
- Polycephalomyces formosus

Scientific classification
- Kingdom: Fungi
- Division: Ascomycota
- Class: Sordariomycetes
- Order: Hypocreales
- Family: Ophiocordycipitaceae
- Genus: Polycephalomyces; Kobayasi (1941)

Synonyms
- Blistum B.C. Sutton (1973)

= Polycephalomyces =

Genus of fungi

Polycephalomyces is a genus of fungi in the family Ophiocordycipitaceae. Members of the genus are parasites or hyperparasites of insects and are found in sub-tropical regions.

== Species ==
The following species are recognised in the genus Polycephalomyces:

- Polycephalomyces agaricus Hong Yu bis & Y.B. Wang 2015
- Polycephalomyces albiramus Y.P. Xiao, T.C. Wen, J.Z. Sun & K.D. Hyde 2023
- Polycephalomyces aurantiacus Y.P. Xiao, T.C. Wen & K.D. Hyde 2018
- Polycephalomyces bannaensis X. Zhang, N.Y. Liu, K.D. Hyde & T.C. Wen 2026
- Polycephalomyces chiangraiensis X. Zhang, K.D. Hyde & T.C. Wen 2026
- Polycephalomyces cuboideus (Kobayasi & Shimizu) Kepler & Spatafora 2013
- Polycephalomyces cylindrosporus Samson & H.C. Evans 1981
- Polycephalomyces ditmarii Van Vooren & Audibert 2005
- Polycephalomyces elaphomyceticola W.Y. Chuang, H.A. Ariyaw., J.I. Yang & M. Stadler 2020
- Polycephalomyces formosus Kobayasi 1941
- Polycephalomyces jinghongensis Hong Yu bis, Z.Heng Liu & D.X. Tang 2024
- Polycephalomyces kanzashianus (Kobayasi & Shimizu) Kepler & Spatafora 2013
- Polycephalomyces lianzhouensis W.M. Zhang & L. Wang 2014
- Polycephalomyces marginaliradians Y.P. Xiao, T.C. Wen & K.D. Hyde 2018
- Polycephalomyces multiperitheciatae Hong Yu bis, Z.Heng Liu & D.X. Tang 2024
- Polycephalomyces myrmecophilus Hong Yu bis, Z.Heng Liu & D.X. Tang 2024
- Polycephalomyces nipponicus (Kobayasi) Kepler & Spatafora 2013
- Polycephalomyces onorei Kautman & Kautman. 2017
- Polycephalomyces paludosus Mains 1948
- Polycephalomyces paracuboideus (S. Ban, Sakane & Nakagiri) Kepler & Spatafora 2013
- Polycephalomyces phaothaiensis Mongkols., Noisrip., Lamlertthon & Luangsa-ard 2017
- Polycephalomyces ponerae Z.Q. Liang, W.H. Chen, J.D. Liang, Y.F. Han & X. Zou 2016
- Polycephalomyces prolificus (Kobayasi) Kepler & Spatafora 2013
- Polycephalomyces ramosus (Peck) Mains 1948
- Polycephalomyces ryogamiensis (Kobayasi & Shimizu) Kepler & Spatafora 2013
- Polycephalomyces sinensis (Q.T. Chen, S.R. Xiao & Z.Y. Shi) W.J. Wang, X.L. Wang, Y. Li, S.R. Xiao & Y.J. Yao 2012
- Polycephalomyces tengchongensis Y. Wang tris & T.C. Wen 2024
- Polycephalomyces tomentosus (Schrad.) Seifert 1985
- Polycephalomyces yunnanensis Hong Yu bis, Y.B. Wang & Y.D. Dai 2014
