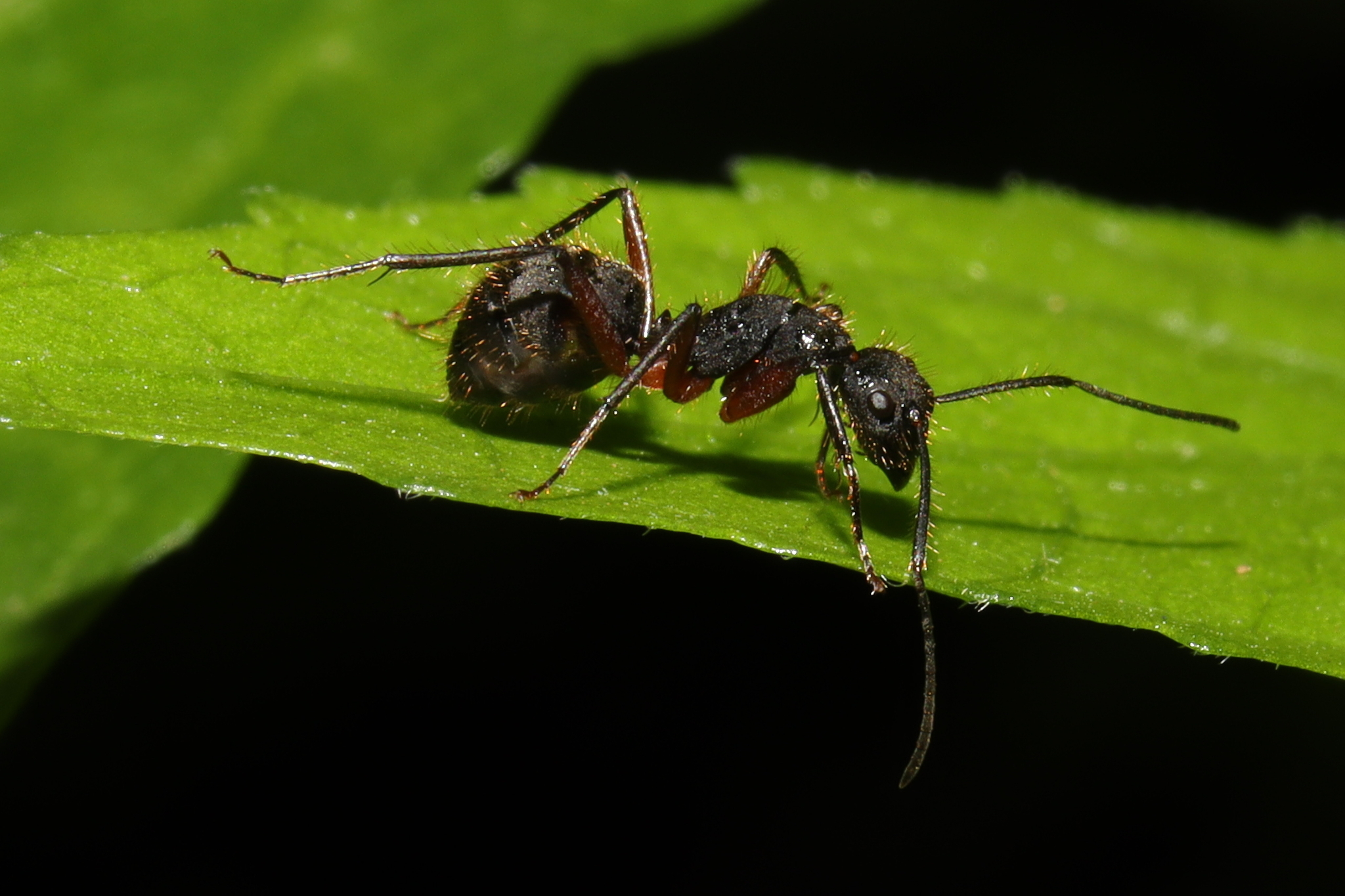

Scientific classification
- Domain: Eukaryota
- Kingdom: Animalia
- Phylum: Arthropoda
- Class: Insecta
- Order: Hymenoptera
- Family: Formicidae
- Subfamily: Formicinae
- Genus: Camponotus
- Subgenus: Myrmosericus
- Species: C. rufipes

Binomial name
- Camponotus rufipes (Fabricius, 1775)

= Camponotus rufipes =

Species of ant

Camponotus rufipes is a dark-brown ant with reddish-yellow legs and a body covered in fine reddish hairs. Workers of this species measure about 6 mm in length. Nocturnal in habit, they attack beehives and build ground nests shaped like a mound of dry grass, approximately 20–30 cm in diameter.

These ants are very common in Southeastern Brazil and are highly aggressive, delivering painful bites accompanied by venom secretion at the bite site, which can cause mild burns. They lack a stinger, and their venom is primarily composed of formic acid.

This is a still poorly studied ant species, with limited research on its biology. Males undergo four larval stages, featuring various types of hairs that play a role in their life cycle.

== Gallery ==
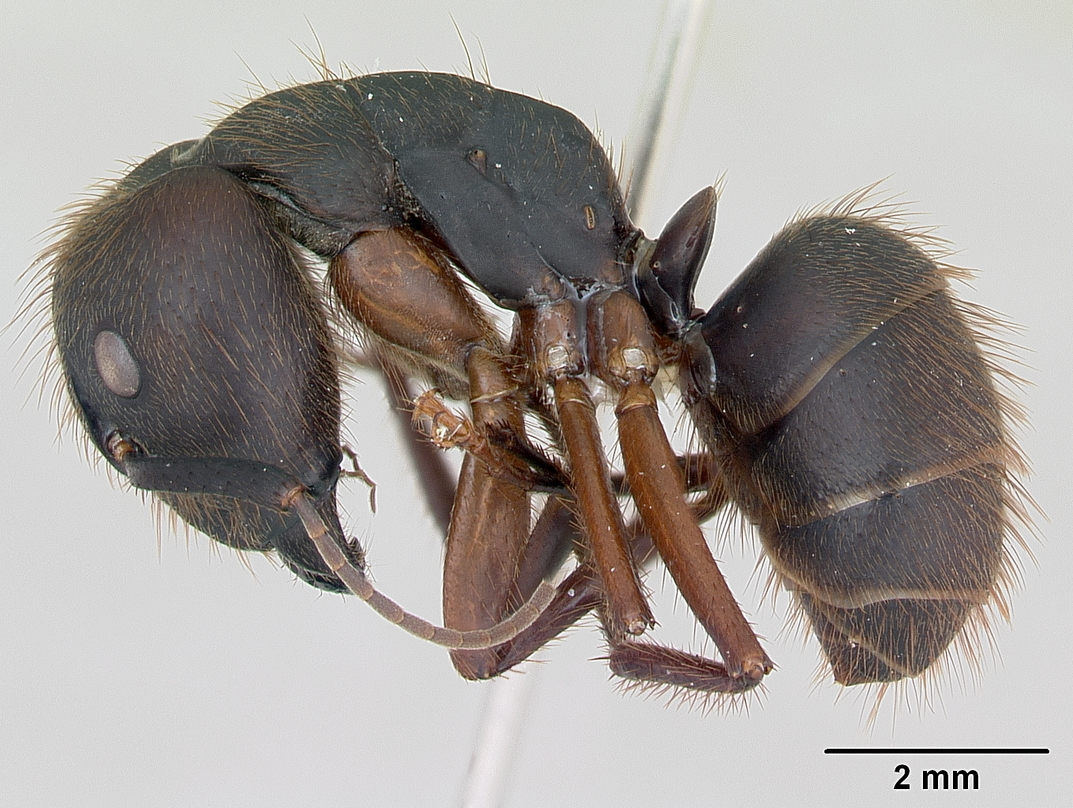
Lateral view

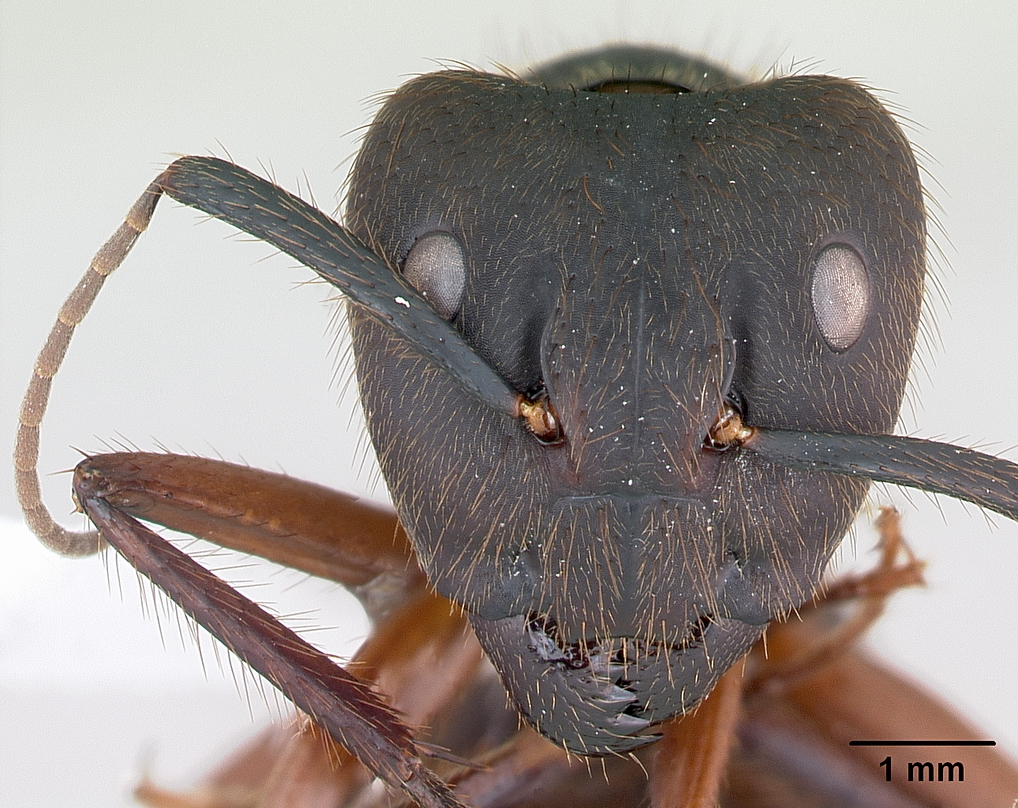
Frontal view

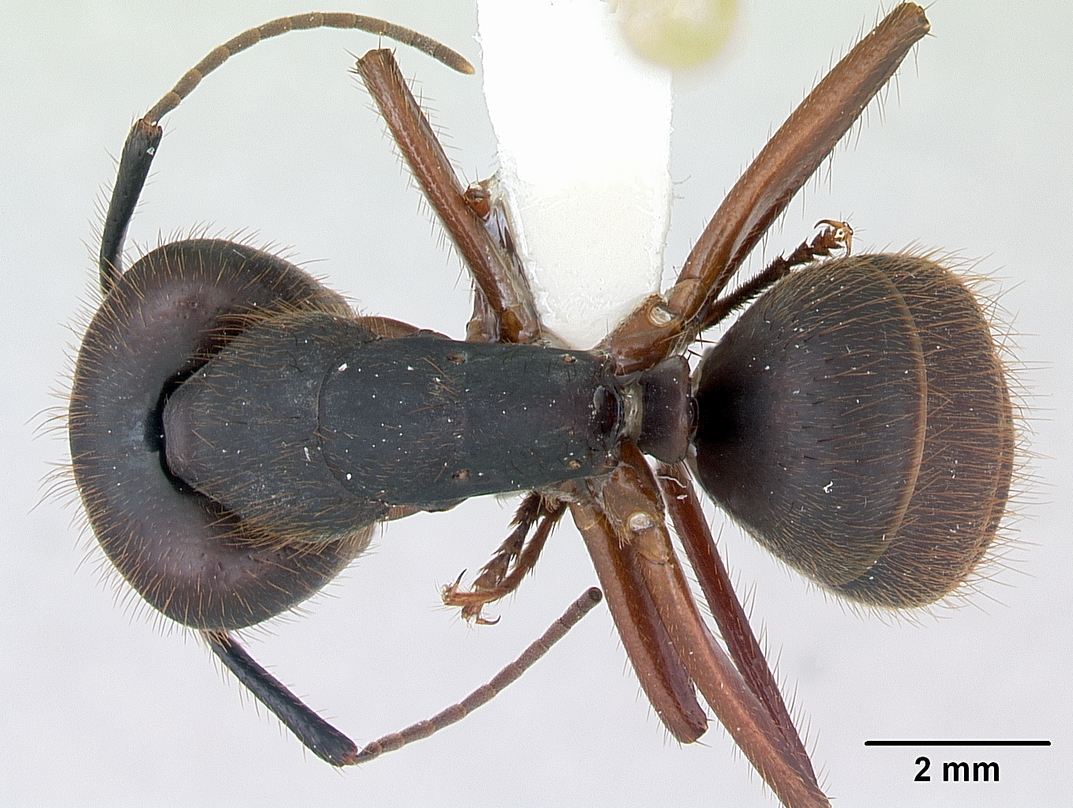
Dorsal view

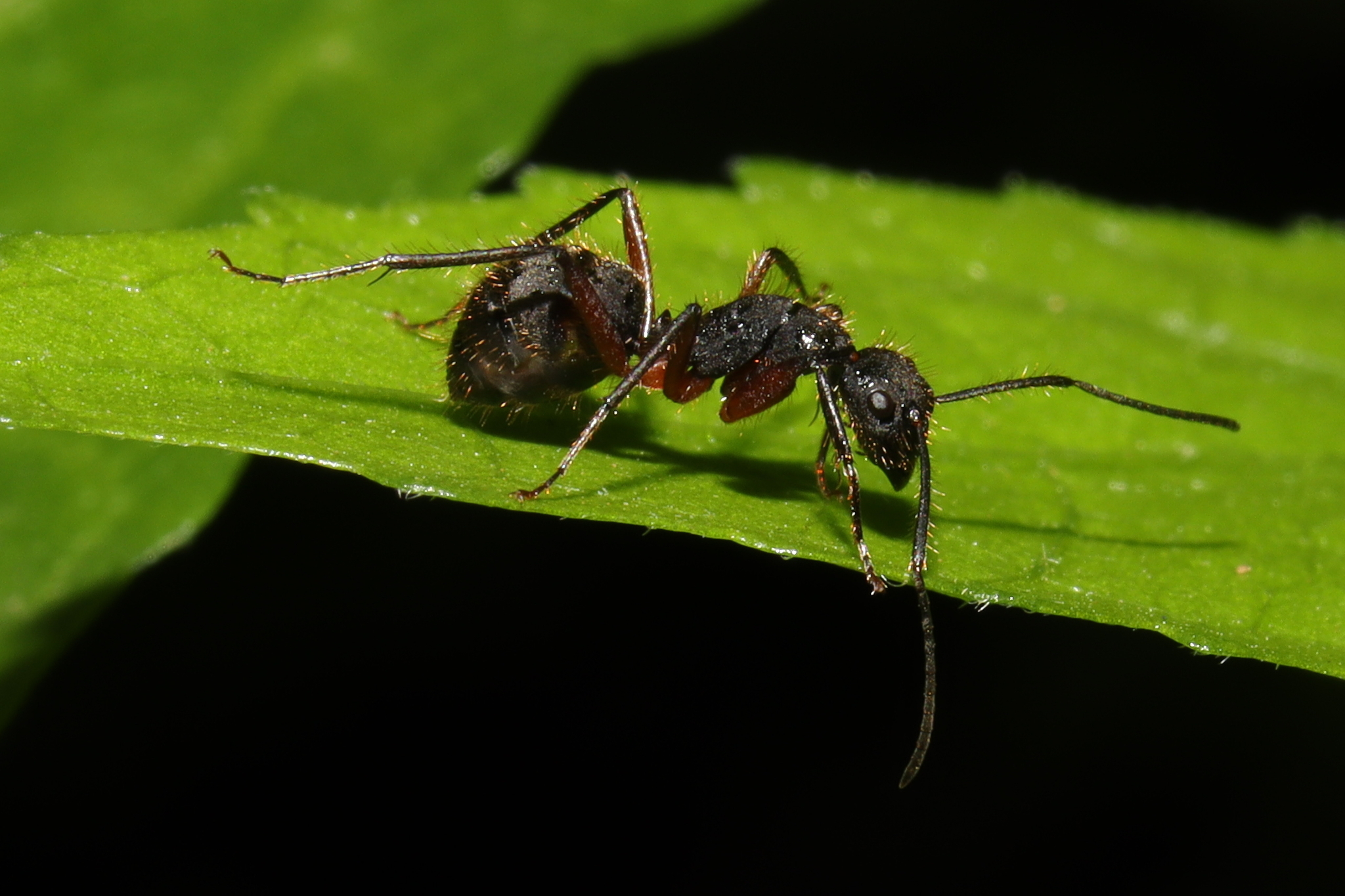
