= Ophiocordyceps camponoti-rufipedis =

Scientific classification
- Kingdom: Fungi
- Division: Ascomycota
- Class: Sordariomycetes
- Order: Hypocreales
- Family: Ophiocordycipitaceae
- Genus: Ophiocordyceps
- Species: O. camponoti-rufipedis

Binomial name
- Ophiocordyceps camponoti-rufipedis Evans, Elliot and Hughes, 2011

Species of fungus

Ophiocordyceps camponoti-rufipedis is a species of fungus that parasitizes insect hosts, in particular members of the order Hymenoptera. It was first isolated from Viçosa, Minas Gerais, at an altitude of 700 metres (2,300 ft) on Camponotus rufipes.

== Description ==
This species' mycelium is densely produced from all of its orifices and sutures; it is initially a silky white, becoming a ginger colour. Its stromata is single, produced from a dorsal pronotum measuring between 5 to 8 millimetres (0.20 to 0.31 in) and 15 millimetres (0.59 in) in length, which is cylindrical, dark brown at its base, and pinkish in the fertile upper part. The ascomata are immersed and flask-shaped, measuring up to 130 millimetres (5.1 in), including a short ostiole.

Its asci are 8-spored, hyaline and cylindrical, while the ascospores are multiserriate and vermiform; its apex is acute, with a rounded base.
