= Hymenostilbe =

Scientific classification
- Kingdom: Fungi
- Division: Ascomycota
- Class: Sordariomycetes
- Order: Hypocreales
- Family: Ophiocordycipitaceae
- Genus: Hymenostilbe; Petch 1931

Genus of fungi

Hymenostilbe is a genus of fungi in the Ophiocordycipitaceae family. All members are anamorph names of Ophiocordyceps.

== Species ==
- Hymenostilbe ampullifera
- Hymenostilbe aphidis
- Hymenostilbe aurantiaca
- Hymenostilbe australiensis
- Hymenostilbe campanoti
- Hymenostilbe dipterigena
- Hymenostilbe formicarum
- Hymenostilbe fragilis
- Hymenostilbe furcata
- Hymenostilbe ghanensis
- Hymenostilbe ichneumonophila
- Hymenostilbe kedrovensis
- Hymenostilbe kobayasii
- Hymenostilbe lecaniicola
- Hymenostilbe longispora
- Hymenostilbe melanopoda
- Hymenostilbe muscaria
- Hymenostilbe nutans
- Hymenostilbe odonatae
- Hymenostilbe sphingum
- Hymenostilbe spiculata
- Hymenostilbe sulphurea
- Hymenostilbe ventricosa
- Hymenostilbe verrucosa
