= Tom Petch =

English mycologist and plant pathologist (1870–1948)

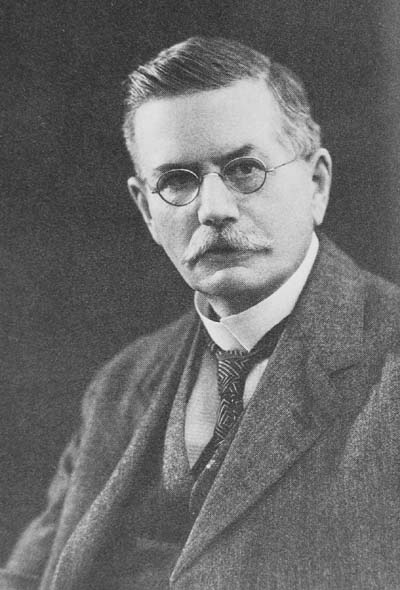
Thomas Petch, c.1930

Thomas Petch (born Hornsea, Yorkshire, 11 March 1870; died King's Lynn, Norfolk, 24 December 1948) was a prolific English mycologist and plant pathologist best remembered for his work on the interaction between fungi and insects.

== Biography ==
Petch was educated at the choir school of Holy Trinity at Hull, and taught at the King's Lynn Grammar School and Leyton Technical Institute while preparing for external degrees at the University of London. Petch had an early interest in natural history, but Charles Plowright, a doctor and mycologist in King's Lynn, encouraged him to study fungi. Through a friendship with George Massee of the Royal Botanical Gardens Petch was appointed Mycologist to the Government of Ceylon in 1905. He returned to England briefly to marry Edith Mary Plowright (b. 1875), Charles' daughter, in 1908.

Petch held this position until 1924. After a leave to visit England, he returned to Ceylon as the founding director of the Tea Research Institute. In 1928 he retired to England, where he lived in North Wootton in the house formerly owned by his father-in-law, near King's Lynn.

During his time in Ceylon, Petch studied the fungal diseases of rubber, cocoanut palm, tea, pepper, tobacco, and other crops grown there. He wrote The Diseases and Pests of the Rubber Tree (1921) and Diseases of the Tea Bush (1924), which were used for decades afterwards. He studied all the local fungi as well, and his life work, published posthumously in 1950, was his Fungi of Ceylon.

Petch became interested in fungi which lived with or on insects, starting in 1906 with a paper on fungi in termite nests. Between 1921 and 1944 he wrote 13 "Studies on entomogeneous fungi" and 7 "Notes on entomogeneous fungi", all except the first published in the Transactions of the British Mycological Society (which Petch had served as president of in 1920). He also compiled a list of entomogeneous fungi in England (1932).

== Family ==
Tom and Emily Petch had at least one son, Charles Plowright Petch (1909-1988), who became a surgeon like his grandfather, was also interested in mycology, and published a Flora of Norfolk of 1968.

== See also ==
- Category:Taxa named by Thomas Petch
