= Hirsutella =

Scientific classification
- Kingdom: Fungi
- Division: Ascomycota
- Class: Sordariomycetes
- Order: Hypocreales
- Family: Ophiocordycipitaceae
- Genus: Hirsutella; Pat., 1892

Type species
- Hirsutella entomophila Pat.

Genus of fungi

Hirsutella is a genus of asexually reproducing fungi in the Ophiocordycipitaceae family. Originally described by French mycologist Narcisse Théophile Patouillard in 1892, this genus includes species that are pathogens of insects, mites and nematodes; there is interest in the use of these fungi as biological controls of insect and nematode pests. The teleomorphs of Hirsutella species are thought to belong to the genus Ophiocordyceps.

== Species ==
- Hirsutella abietina
- Hirsutella acerosa
- Hirsutella acridiorum
- Hirsutella aphidis
- Hirsutella asiae
- Hirsutella atewensis
- Hirsutella barberi
- Hirsutella besseyi
- Hirsutella brownorum
- Hirsutella citriformis
- Hirsutella clavispora
- Hirsutella coccidiicola
- Hirsutella crinita
- Hirsutella cryptosclerotium
- Hirsutella danubiensis
- Hirsutella darwinii
- Hirsutella dendritica
- Hirsutella dipterigena
- Hirsutella entomophila
- Hirsutella exoleta
- Hirsutella floccosa
- Hirsutella formicarum
- Hirsutella fusiformis
- Hirsutella gigantea
- Hirsutella graptopsaltriae
- Hirsutella gregis
- Hirsutella guignardii
- Hirsutella guyana
- Hirsutella haptospora
- Hirsutella heteroderae
- Hirsutella heteropoda
- Hirsutella huangshanensis
- Hirsutella hunanensis
- Hirsutella illustris
- Hirsutella jonesii
- Hirsutella kirchneri
- Hirsutella lecaniicola
- Hirsutella leizhouensis
- Hirsutella liberiana
- Hirsutella liboensis
- Hirsutella longicolla
- Hirsutella longissima
- Hirsutella minnesotensis
- Hirsutella necatrix
- Hirsutella neovolkiana
- Hirsutella nivea
- Hirsutella nodulosa
- Hirsutella nutans
- Hirsutella ovalispora
- Hirsutella parasitica
- Hirsutella patouillardii
- Hirsutella petchabunensis
- Hirsutella pichilinguensis
- Hirsutella piligena
- Hirsutella proturicola
- Hirsutella radiata
- Hirsutella ramosa
- Hirsutella rhossiliensis
- Hirsutella rostrata
- Hirsutella rubripunctata
- Hirsutella satumaensis
- Hirsutella saussurei
- Hirsutella setosa
- Hirsutella sphaerospora
- Hirsutella sporodochialis
- Hirsutella stilbelliformis
- Hirsutella strigosa
- Hirsutella stylophora
- Hirsutella subramanianii
- Hirsutella subulata
- Hirsutella surinamensis
- Hirsutella thompsonii
- Hirsutella tydeicola
- Hirsutella uncinata
- Hirsutella vandergeestii
- Hirsutella vermicola
- Hirsutella versicolor
- Hirsutella verticillioides
- Hirsutella volkiana
- Hirsutella yunnanensis
- Hirsutella zhangjiajiensis
