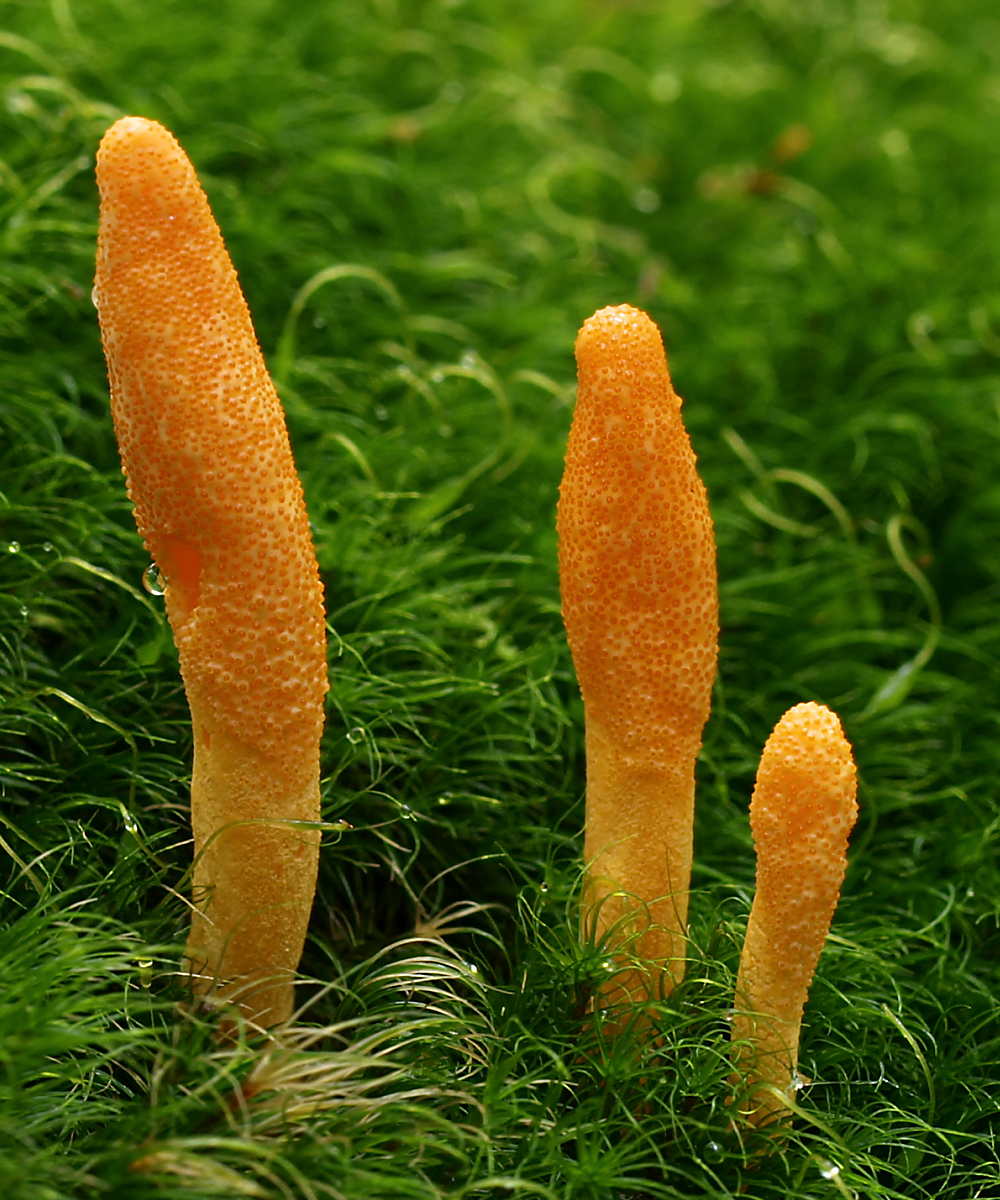
- Cordyceps militaris

Scientific classification
- Kingdom: Fungi
- Division: Ascomycota
- Class: Sordariomycetes
- Order: Hypocreales
- Family: Cordycipitaceae
- Genus: Cordyceps; Fr. (1818)

Type species
- Cordyceps militaris (L.) Fr. (1818)

Synonyms
- List: Akrophyton Lebert (1858); Alphitomyces Reissek (1856); Amphichorda Fr. (1825); Campylothecium Ces. (1846); Cordylia Fr. (1818); Cordyliceps Fr. (1832); Coremiopsis Sizova & Suprun (1957); Corynesphaera Dumort.2 (1822); Evlachovaea B.A. Borisov & Tarasov (1999); Hypoxylum Juss. (1789); Isaria Pers. (1794); Phytocordyceps C.H. Su & H.H. Wang (1986); Polistophthora Lebert (1858); Racemella Ces. (1861); Ramaria Holmsk. (1781); Tettigorhyza G. Bertol. (1875); Torrubia Lév. (1863); Xylaria Hill ex Grev (1823)

= Cordyceps =

Genus of fungi

Cordyceps /ˈkɔːrdɪsɛps/ is a genus of ascomycete fungi (sac fungi) that includes over 260 species worldwide, many of which are parasitic. Diverse variants of cordyceps have had more than 1,500 years of use in Chinese medicine. Most Cordyceps species are endoparasitoids, parasitic mainly on insects and other arthropods (they are thus entomopathogenic fungi); a few are parasitic on other fungi.

The generic name Cordyceps is derived from the ancient Greek κορδύλη kordýlē, meaning "club", and the Latin -ceps, derived from Latin caput, meaning "head". The genus has a worldwide distribution, with most of the known species being from Asia.

== Taxonomy ==
There are two recognized subgenera:

- Cordyceps subgen. Cordyceps Fr. 1818
- Cordyceps subgen. Cordylia Tul. & C. Tul. 1865

Cordyceps in the strict sense are the fruiting bodies of several genera of entomopathogenic fungi such as Beauveria (Cordyceps bassiana), Septofusidium, and Lecanicillium.

=== Splits ===
Cordyceps subgen. Epichloe was at one time a subgenus, but is now regarded as a separate genus, Epichloë.

Cordyceps subgen. Ophiocordyceps was at one time a subgenus defined by morphology. Nuclear DNA sampling reveals that members, including "C. sinensis" and "C. unilateralis", as well as some others not placed in the subgenus, were distantly related to most of the remainder of species then placed in Cordyceps (e.g. the type species C. militaris). As a result, it became its own genus, absorbing new members.

The 2007 study also peeled off Metacordyceps (anamorph Metarhizium, Pochonia) and Elaphocordyceps. A number of species remain unclearly assigned and provisionally retained in Cordyceps in the broad sense.

=== Selected species ===
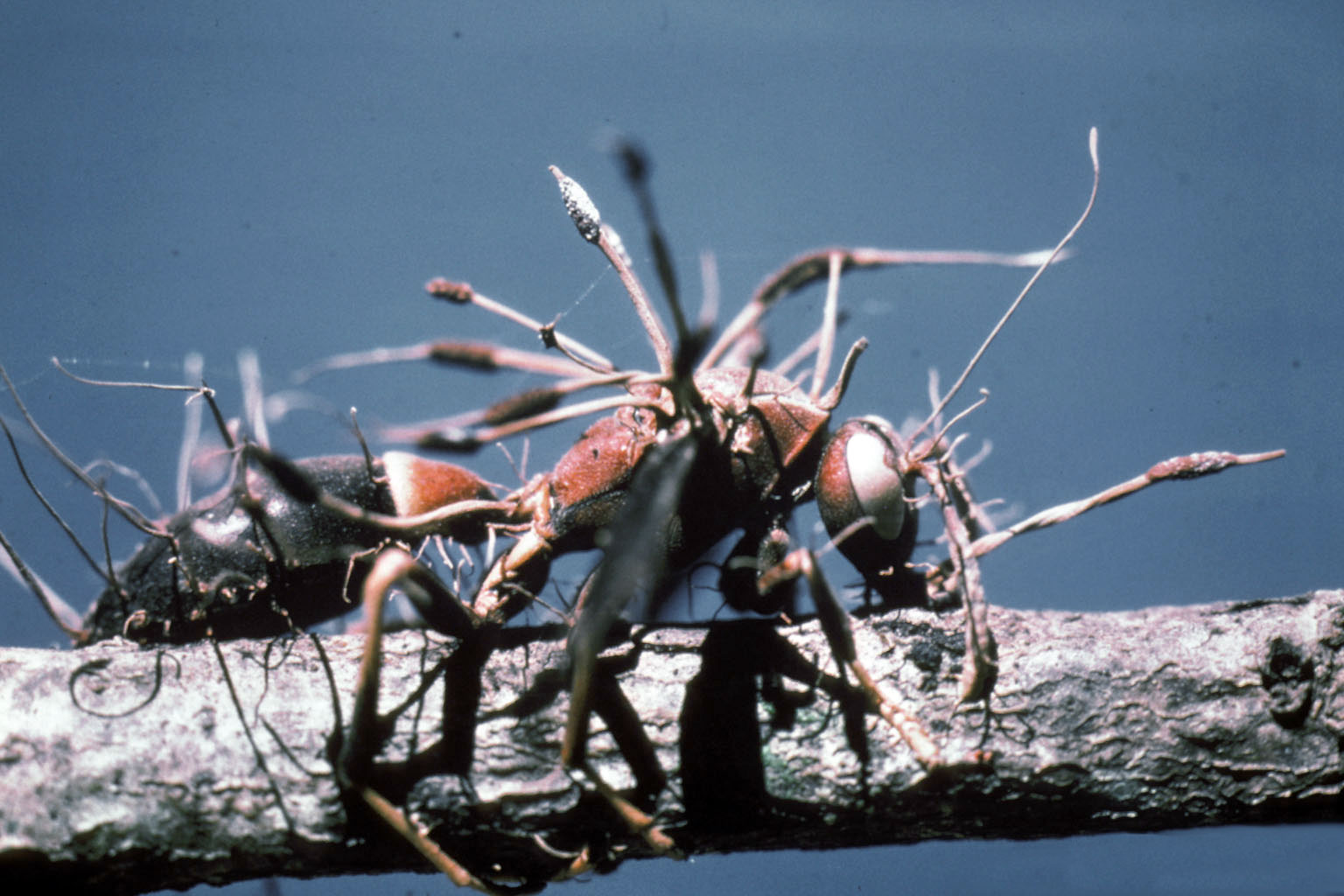
A wasp parasitized by an entomopathogenic species of Cordyceps

There are over 260 species in the genus Cordyceps.

=== Anamorphic genera ===
Isaria is a genus name that has been applied to many anamorphs (asexual reproductive stages) of Cordyceps species. Isaria is treated as a synonym of Cordyceps in Species Fungorum following the one fungus, one name change, but many species names with Isaria are still preferred by Species Fungorum over the synonyms in other genera (e.g. Isaria sinclairii is preferred over Cordyceps sinclairii). Though confusing, this does match the "equal footing for priority" approach of the "one fungus one name" concept. To add to the complexity, Isaria is a conserved name with a conserved type. What remains under Isaria as of 2016 remains polyphyletic and can be divided into three main clades.

Anamorphic genera closely allied to Cordyceps in the strict sense include Evlachovaea, Lecanicillium and Beauveria.

== Biology ==
When Cordyceps attacks a host, the mycelium invades and eventually replaces the host tissue, while the elongated fruit body (ascocarp) may be cylindrical, branched, or of complex shape. The ascocarp bears many small, flask-shaped perithecia containing asci. These, in turn, contain thread-like ascospores, which usually break into fragments and are presumably infective. Cordyceps are used by drab stinkbugs to protect their eggs from parasitoid wasps.

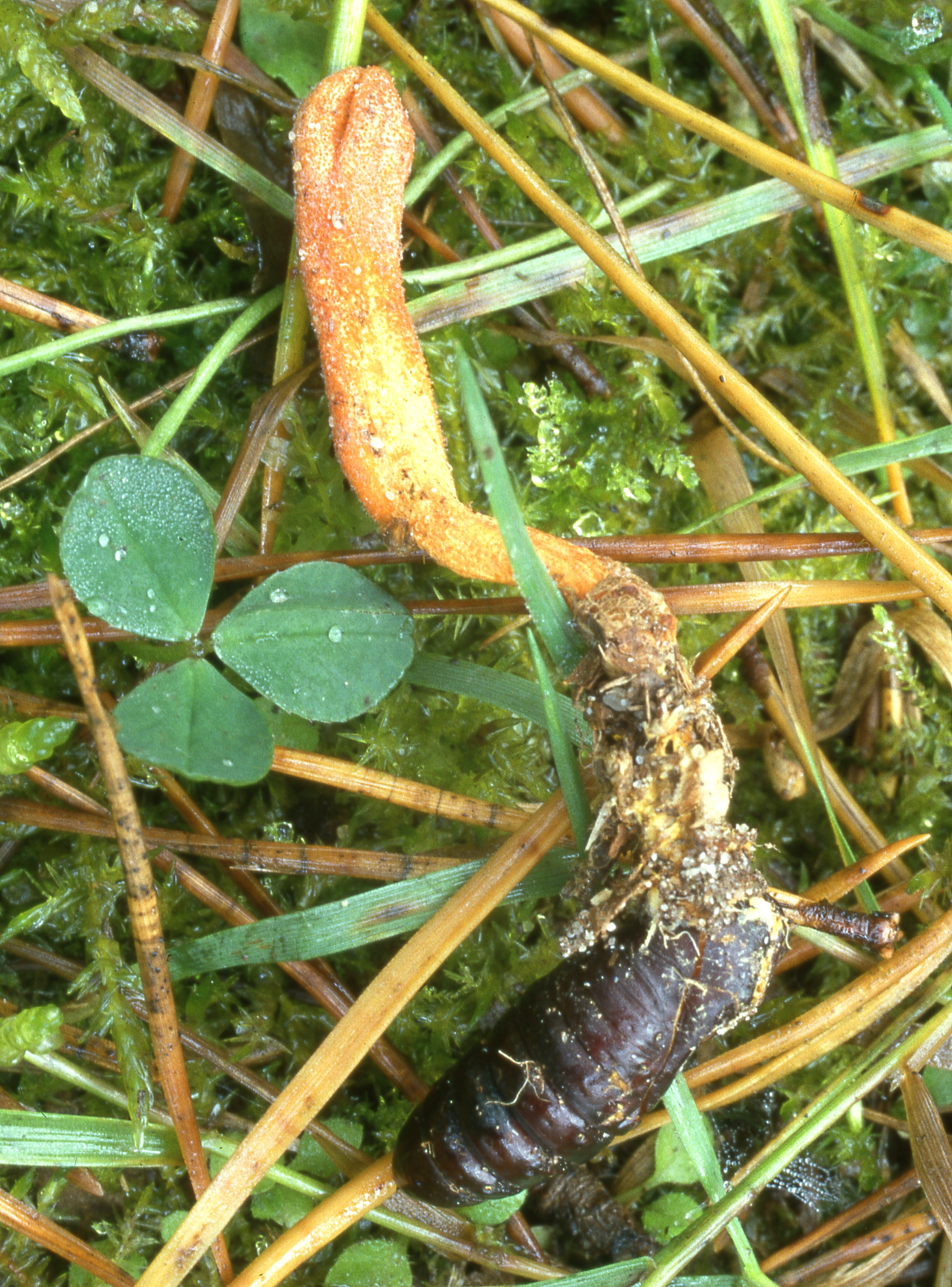
Cordyceps militaris

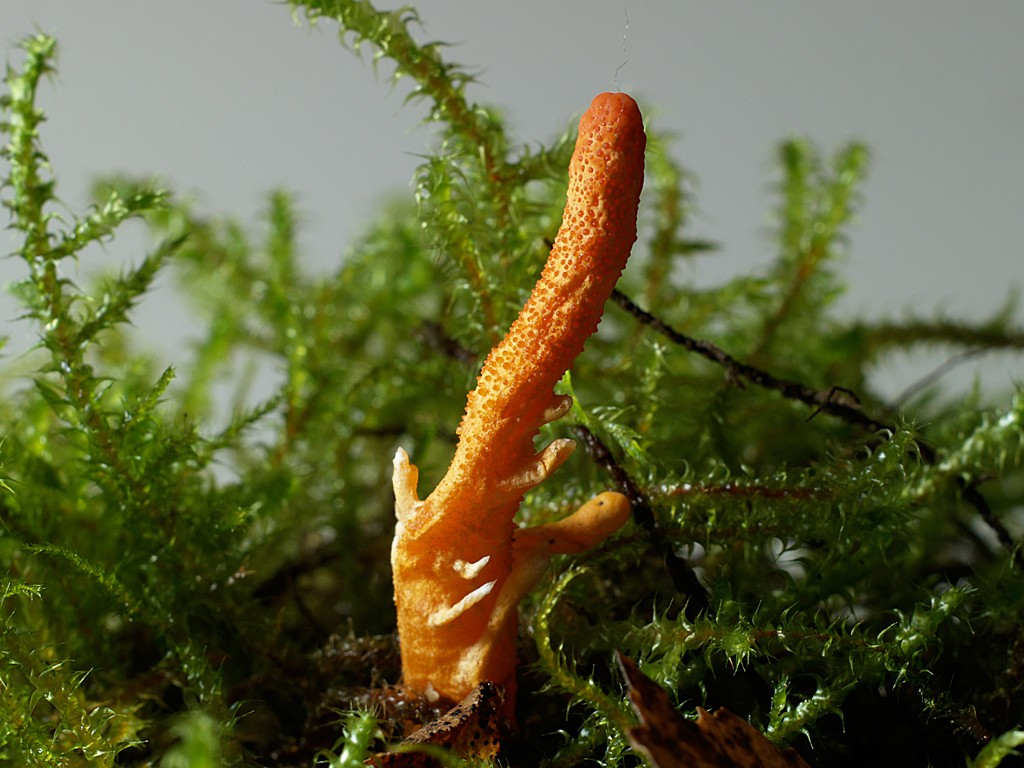
Cordyceps militaris

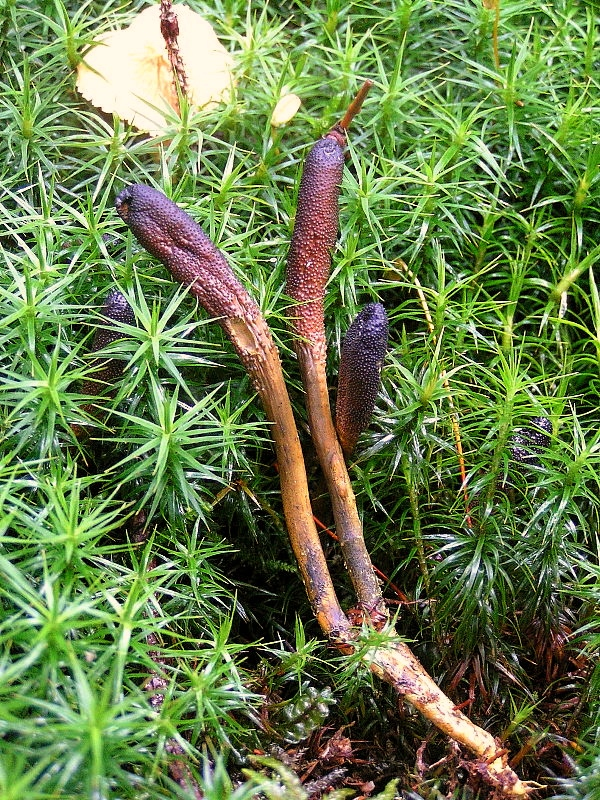
Cordyceps ophioglossoides

== Research ==
Cordycepin

Polysaccharide components and the nucleoside cordycepin isolated from C. militaris are under basic research, but more advanced clinical research has been limited and too low in quality to identify any therapeutic potential of cordyceps components.

== Uses ==
Cordyceps in the broad sense (which now includes Ophiocordyceps and many other genera holding species originally in this genus) has long been used in traditional Chinese medicine in the belief it can be used to treat diseases.

== Cultural representations ==
The video game series The Last of Us (2013–2021) and its television adaptation proceeds from the premise that a new species of Cordyceps manages to jump the species barrier to infect humans, resulting in a zombie apocalypse. Reflecting real Cordyceps biology, the fictional fungi's human hosts initially become violent before turning into blind zombies with fungal growths emerging from their heads, then seek out a dark place in which to die and release the fungal spores, enabling the parasite to complete its life cycle. Scientific American notes that some species in the genus "are indeed body snatchers–they have been making real zombies for millions of years", though of ants or tarantulas, not of humans.

In the 2014 postapocalyptic novel The Girl with All the Gifts and its 2016 film adaptation the human-infecting fungus is a mutated form of Ophiocordyceps unilateralis (a group of species now split off from Cordyceps) which alters the behaviour of infected insects.

== See also ==
- Medicinal fungi
