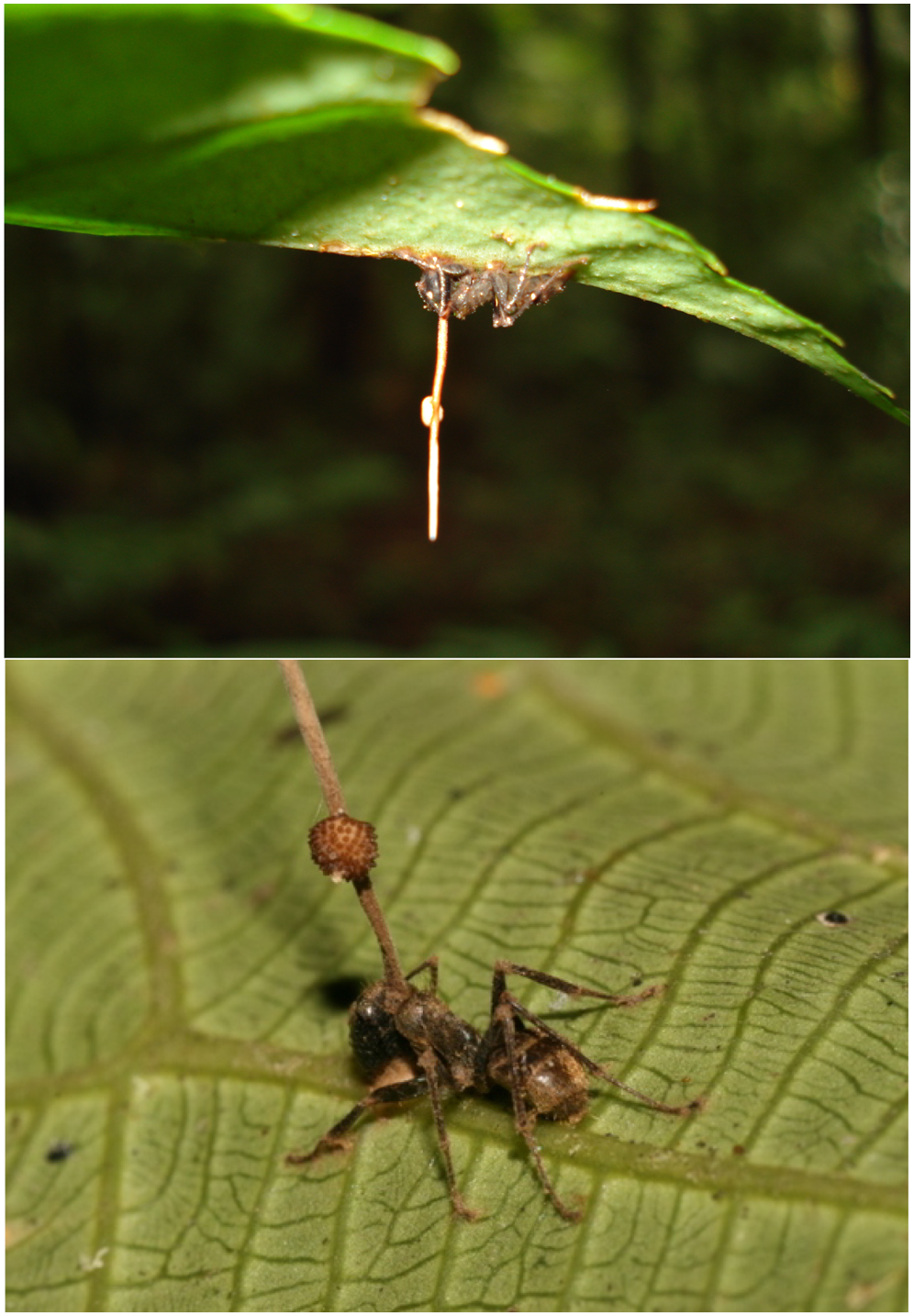
- Dead ants infected with Ophiocordyceps unilateralis

Scientific classification
- Kingdom: Fungi
- Division: Ascomycota
- Class: Sordariomycetes
- Order: Hypocreales
- Family: Ophiocordycipitaceae; G.H.Sung, J.M.Sung, Hywel-Jones & Spatafora (2007)

Type genus
- Ophiocordyceps Petch (1931)

= Ophiocordycipitaceae =

Ophiocordycipitaceae Temporal range: Middle Cretaceous - Recent, 105–0 Ma

Family of fungi

Ophiocordycipitaceae is a family of parasitic fungi in the phylum Ascomycota, class Sordariomycetes. It was created in 2007 to resolve the paraphyly of Calvicipitaceae. It was updated in 2020.

== Genera ==
As accepted in 2020; (with number of species)

- Hantamomyces Crous (1)
- Unilateralis T. F. Kirschtein (1)
- Harposporium Lohde (37) (Anamorphic)
- Hirsutella Pat. (50+)
- Hymenostilbe Petch (12)
- Ophiocordyceps Petch (263)
- Paraisaria Samson & B.L. Brady (11)
- Perennicordyceps Matočec & I. Kušan (4)
- Pleurocordyceps Y.J. Yao, Y.H. Wang, S. Ban, W.J. Wang, Yi Li, Ke Wang & P.M. Kirk (10)
- Polycephalomyces Kobayasi (18)
- Purpureocilium Luangsa-ard, Hywel-Jones, Houbraken & Samson (5)
- Syngliocladium Petch 1932 (5)
- Tolypocladium W. Gams (47)

Former assignments:

- Blistum split up into different genera
- Didymobotryopsis Accepted by Species Fungorum but not 2020 Outline
- Haptocillium moved to Drechmeria, Clavicipitaceae
- Synnematium synonym for Hirsutella
- Trichosterigma synonym for Hirsutella

=== Fossil species ===
- †Paleoophiocordyceps

== See also ==
- Cordycipitaceae
- Cordyceps
