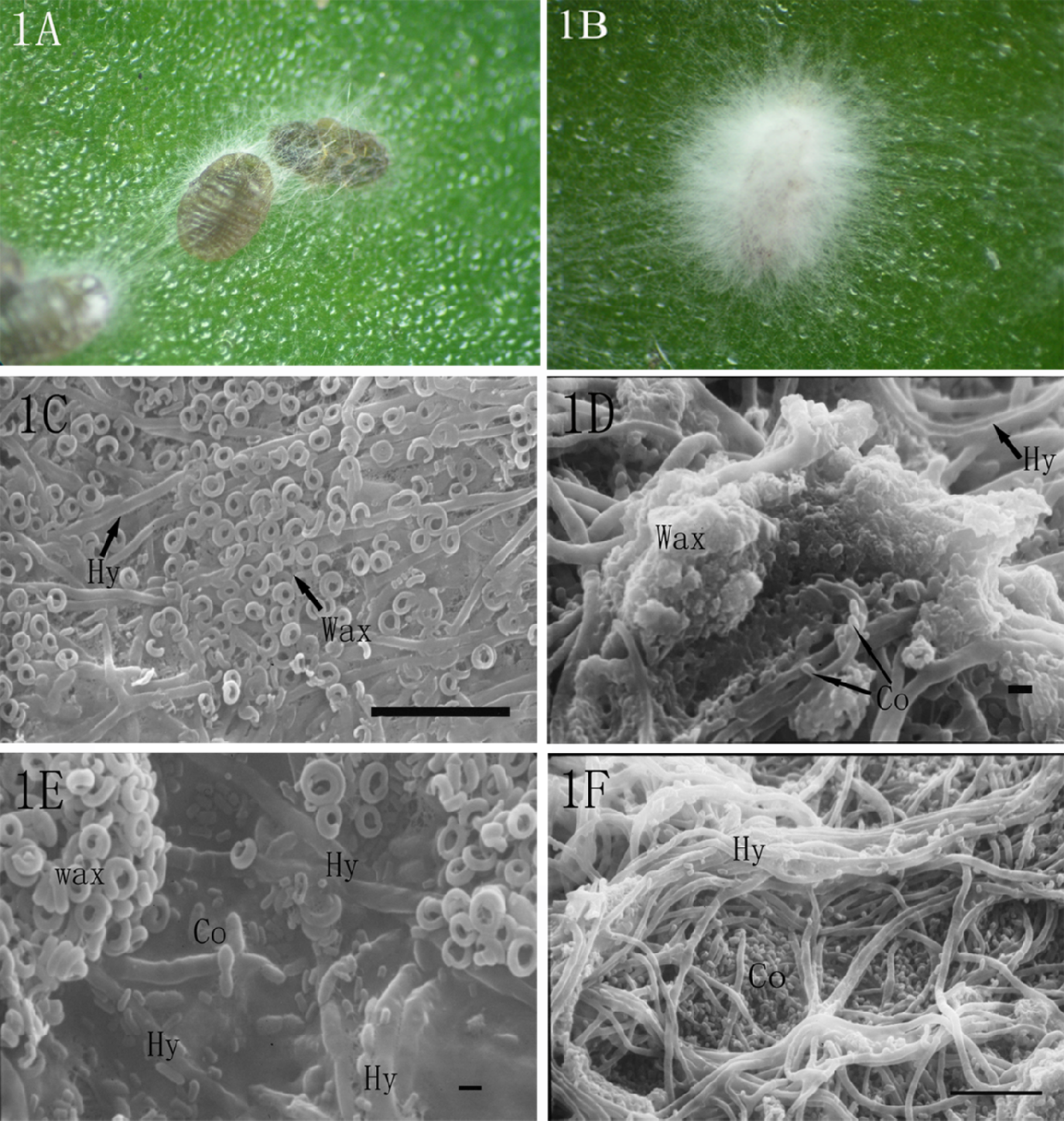
- Hyphae on the nymph body surface of Phencacoccus fraxinus. (1A) The hyphae grew around the body marginal regions. (1B) The body of nymph was completely covered by white mycelium. (1C) The hyphae (Hy) passed through the waxy filament (3000×, bar = 10 μm). (1D) The hyphae (Hy) passed through the wet waxy agglomeration (4000×, bar = 1 μm). (1E) The intersegmental folds were invaded by the conidia (Co) and by the hyphae (Hy) (5000×, bar = 1 μm). (1F) Many spores scattered among the hyphae (Hy) (2000×, bar = 10 μm).

Scientific classification
- Kingdom: Fungi
- Division: Ascomycota
- Class: Sordariomycetes
- Order: Hypocreales
- Family: Cordycipitaceae
- Genus: Lecanicillium
- Species: L. lecanii

Binomial name
- Lecanicillium lecanii R. Zare & W. Gams, 2001

= Lecanicillium lecanii =

Species of fungus

Lecanicillium lecanii is now an approved name of an entomopathogenic fungus species, that was previously widely known as Verticillium lecanii (Zimmerman) Viegas), but is now understood to be an anamorphic form in the Cordyceps group of genera in the Clavicipitaceae. Isolates formerly classified as V. lecanii could be L. attenuatum, L. lecanii, L. longisporum, L. muscarium or L. nodulosum. For example, several recent papers, such as Kouvelis et al. who carried out mitochondrial DNA studies, refer to the name L. muscarium.

L. lecanii itself appears primarily to be a pathogen of soft scale insects (Coccidae).

== Synonyms ==
The Index Fungorum, referring to L. lecanii, lists the following synonyms:

- Cephalosporium coccorum Petch, Trans. Br. mycol. Soc. 10: 175 (1925) [1924]
- Cephalosporium dipterigenum Petch, Naturalist (Hull), ser. 3: 102 (1931)
- Cephalosporium lecanii Zimm., Teysmannia 9: 243 (1898)
- Cephalosporium lecanii f. coccorum (Petch) Bałazy, Borbäsia 14: 132 (1973)
- Cephalosporium subclavatum Petch, Trans. Br. mycol. Soc. 25: 262 (1942) [1941]
- Cordyceps confragosa (Mains) G.H. Sung, J.M. Sung, Hywel-Jones & Spatafora, in Sung, Hywel-Jones, Sung, Luangsa-ard, Shrestha & Spatafora, Stud. Mycol. 57: 49 (2007)
- Sporotrichum lichenicola Berk. & Broome, J. Linn. Soc., Bot. 14(2): 102 (1875)
- Torrubiella confragosa Mains, Mycologia 41(3): 305 (1949)
- Verticillium coccorum (Petch) Westerd., CBS List of Cultures (Baarn): 103 (1935)
- Verticillium lecanii (Zimm.) Viégas, Revista Inst. Café São Paulo 14: 754 (1939)

== Role in Horticulture ==
This fungus was first described in 1861 and has a worldwide distribution. Insects are infected when they come into contact with the sticky fungal spores which then grow and invade the body, thus the internal organs are consumed, leading to their death. In horticulture and agriculture, "V. lecanii" isolates were developed for controlling insect pests such as whitefly, thrips and aphids, by RA Hall and HD Burges (scientists at the Glasshouse Crops Research Institute, now Warwick HRI: formerly part of Horticulture Research International). Biological pesticides based on Lecanicillium spp. are now marketed as 'Mycotal' (now L. muscarium) and 'Vertalec' (now L. longisporum) by Koppert in the Netherlands (who provide good illustrations of the fungus). Other products based on these fungi have been developed elsewhere for use in cash crops, oil seeds, soybeans, ornamentals and vegetables.
