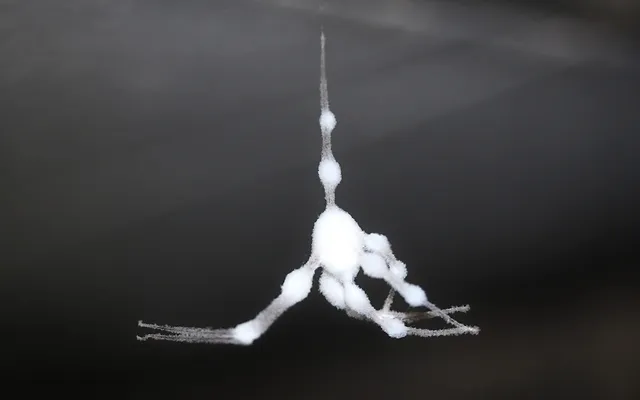
- Engyodontium aranearum

Scientific classification
- Domain: Eukaryota
- Kingdom: Fungi
- Division: Ascomycota
- Class: Sordariomycetes
- Order: Hypocreales
- Family: Cordycipitaceae
- Genus: Engyodontium de Hoog

= Engyodontium =

Genus of fungi

Engyodontium is a genus of fungi belonging to the group Hyphomycetes and contains about 6 species. This fungus was formerly included in Beauveria, but is now recognized as a distinct genus.

Outdoors it is common in soil and plant debris. Indoors, it can be found on paper, textiles, jute, and painted walls. The most common species is E. album. It forms a cottony, white colony producing numerous dry, tiny conidia. Production of mycotoxins by this fungus has not been reported at this time. It is an opportunist fungus and causes brain abscesses, keratitis, and native valve endocarditis to immunocompromised people.

In 2023, Australian scientists discovered the ability of E. album to decompose polypropylene plastic completely in 140 days.

== List of species ==
According to GBIF, Catalogue of Life and Encyclopedia of Life, these are the species of Engyodontium:

- Engyodontium album (Limber) de Hoog 1978
- Engyodontium aranearum (Cavara) W. Gams, de Hoog, Samson & H. C. Evans 1984
- Engyodontium geniculatum H.C.Evans & Samson
- Engyodontium parvisporum (Petch) de Hoog
- Engyodontium rectidentatum (Matsush.) W.Gams, de Hoog, Samson & H.C.Evans
