= Lecanicillium longisporum =

Scientific classification
- Kingdom: Fungi
- Division: Ascomycota
- Class: Sordariomycetes
- Order: Hypocreales
- Family: Cordycipitaceae
- Genus: Lecanicillium
- Species: L. longisporum

Binomial name
- Lecanicillium longisporum R. Zare & W. Gams, 2001

Species of fungus

Lecanicillium longisporum is the approved name of an entomopathogenic fungus species, that was previously widely known as Verticillium lecanii (Zimmerman) Viegas, but is now understood to be an anamorphic form in the Cordyceps group of genera in the Cordycipitaceae. It now appears that isolates formerly classified as V. lecanii could be L. attenuatum, L. lecanii, L. longisporum, L. muscarium or L. nodulosum.

"V. lecanii" was first described in 1861 and has a worldwide distribution. Insects are infected when they come into contact with the sticky fungal spores which then grow and invade the body, thus the internal organs are consumed, leading to their death. In horticulture and agriculture, the Lecanicillium longisporum Isolate (GCRI 1-72; IMI 179172) was first isolated and developed by scientists, Drs R.A.Hall and H.D.Burges at the Glasshouse Crops Research Institute (now Warwick HRI: formerly part of Horticulture Research International).

== Products and important isolates ==
L. longisporum is now marketed as 'Vertalec', for management of aphid pests, by Koppert in the Netherlands (who provide good illustrations of the fungus). 'Vertalec', based on strain IMI 179172, was first commercialised and registered in the UK through the collaboration of GCRI and Tate and Lyle Ltd (UK).
