= Lecanicillium muscarium =

Scientific classification
- Kingdom: Fungi
- Division: Ascomycota
- Class: Sordariomycetes
- Order: Hypocreales
- Family: Cordycipitaceae
- Genus: Lecanicillium
- Species: L. muscarium

Binomial name
- Lecanicillium muscarium R. Zare & W. Gams, 2001

Species of fungus

Lecanicillium muscarium is the approved name of an entomopathogenic fungus species, that was previously widely known as Verticillium lecanii (Zimmerman) Viegas), but is now understood to be an anamorphic form in the Cordyceps group of genera in the Cordycipitaceae. It now appears that isolates formerly classified as V. lecanii could be L. attenuatum, L. lecanii, L. longisporum, L. muscarium or L. nodulosum. For example, several recent papers, such as Kouvelis et al. carried out mitochondrial DNA studies, refer to this name.

This fungus was first described in 1861 and has a worldwide distribution. Insects are infected when they come into contact with the sticky fungal spores which then grow and invade the body, thus the internal organs are consumed, leading to their death. In horticulture and agriculture, the Lecanicillium muscarium isolate (isolate GCRI 19–79) was first developed by scientists, Drs Richard A Hall and HD Burges at the Glasshouse Crops Research Institute (now Warwick HRI: formerly part of Horticulture Research International).

== Important isolates ==
L. muscarium isolate Ve6 (GCRI 19–79; IMI 268317; ARSEF 5128; CBS 102 071) is marketed as 'Mycotal' and has been re-registered in the EU: especially for control of whiteflies such as Trialeurodes vaporariorum and thrips by Koppert in the Netherlands, who provide good illustrations of the fungus. Commercialisation of the fungus and registration in the UK, in the form of 'Mycotal', was originally through the collaboration of the Glasshouse Crops Research Institute and Tate and Lyle Ltd (UK).

Other products, possibly based on this fungus have been developed elsewhere for use in cash crops, oil seeds, soybeans, ornamentals and vegetables.
