= Gibellula attenboroughii =

Scientific classification
- Kingdom: Fungi
- Division: Ascomycota
- Class: Sordariomycetes
- Order: Hypocreales
- Family: Cordycipitaceae
- Genus: Gibellula
- Species: G. attenboroughii

Binomial name
- Gibellula attenboroughii H.C. Evans & J.P.M. Araújo

Species of parasitic fungus

Gibellula attenboroughii is a species of parasitoid fungus found on arachnids. It was first discovered in 2021 during the BBC Winterwatch television series and is named after the naturalist and broadcaster David Attenborough. It parasitises the spiders Meta menardi and Metellina merianae. G. attenboroughii has only been recorded on the island of Ireland & in Western Sweden, although there are specimens of Gibellula tentatively identified as G. attenboroughii known from Wales. The spiders the fungus parasitises are found predominantly in caves and man-made spaces like cellars and culverts. Spiders infected by the fungus undergo behavioural changes that lead them to move to more open areas before dying, facilitating the dispersal of the fungal spores.

== Taxonomy ==
The species was first discovered in 2021 during the BBC Winterwatch television series. An infected Metellina merianae spider was found on the ceiling of an abandoned gunpowder storeroom at Castle Espie, located in County Down, Northern Ireland. The specimen was provisionally identified as Gibellula pulchra. The BBC sent images of the specimen to H.C. Evans, suggesting that the specimen might represent a new species of Gibellula. This hypothesis was discussed in the following year's Springwatch series, following which the specimen was removed from the storeroom and sent for examination. Analysis of the morphology of the fungus in the wild and in culture, as well as genetic data, led to the description of G. attenboroughii as a new species distinct from G. pulchra. Genetic data supports the position of Gibellula attenboroughii in the G. pulchra complex, but its exact relationships with close species such as G. flava are speculative.

Gibellula attenboroughii is named after the naturalist and broadcaster David Attenborough, who served as controller of BBC 2 and helped develop the Natural History Unit of BBC Studios, which produced the documentary during which this species was discovered. Popular science reporting informally described the fungus as turning the spiders into "zombies".

== Morphology ==
In the holotype specimen on Metellina merianae, the mycelial mat is dense and white, turning creamish yellow upon drying. There are many cylindrical, swollen, and woolly (floccose) synnemata all over the specimen. The synnemata are creamish-white in color and have a diameter of up to 250 μm at the base, tapering at the tip. They are 3–7 mm long and have the tip swollen and club- or oval-shaped. The conidiophores are present along the entire synnemata, more sparsely at the base and becoming more dense towards the tip. The conidiophores at the base have long stipes 80–120 × 5–8 μm in dimension, while those towards the tip have shorter stipes 20–30 × 6–8 μm in dimension. The heads are aspergilliform or occasionally penicillioid, with a rough wall, and 1 or 2 prominent septa.

== Habitat ==
Gibellula attenboroughii is currently known only from the island of Ireland. In Northern Ireland, it has been recorded from County Down and County Fermanagh. In the Republic of Ireland, it is known from County Cavan. Specimens of Metellina merianae spiders infected with Gibellula fungi from Wales may also represent records of G. attenboroughii, but this identification is tentative.

Metellina merianae inhabits the twilight zone near the entrances to caves, as well as man-made spaces such as cellars, culverts, and storage-rooms. Meta menardi is more common in the dark zone, but is specially adapted to the epigean/hypogean ecotone and frequently shares an overlapping niche with Metellina merianae. In one case, infected specimens of both species were found around 3 cm apart around 20 m from the entrance to a cave.

== Biology ==
Both Meta menardi and Metellina merianae are rather cryptic spiders, preferring to stay close to their webs and use sit-and-wait strategies to hunt prey. However, all specimens of spiders infected by G. attenboroughii have been found exposed in the open on the ceiling of caves and man-made structures. This may be a behavioural change caused by G. attenboroughii, as specimens that die in more open areas would be more exposed to air currents that spread spores. Similar behavioural changes have been observed in Welsh specimens of spiders tentatively identified as being infected by G. attenboroughii; as there were no cave systems in that locality, the spiders instead moved from their usual niches to more open sphagnum moss.
