= José Torrubia =

Spanish Catholic missionary, scientist and author

José Torrubia was born in 1698 in Spain, professed his vows as priest and as a Franciscan in 1714. He was also a naturalist (interested in Geology and palaeontology).

He volunteered for missionary service in the Philippines, arriving there in 1721. He traveled to Canton. His talents were recognized early and he moved rapidly into significant positions, most notably in 1734 when he was picked to represent the Philippine Franciscans in Spain and Rome.

After almost a decade in Spain, he had become embroiled with the Philippine Franciscans over disputed interpretations of his instructions as their representative.

He went to Mexico with Spanish Franciscans destined for the Philippines, but intuiting that his welcome there would be uncertain but probably hostile, he joined a Mexican group of Franciscans in 1745. The disputes engendered a small mountain of paper as the parties tried to convince the Spanish king, Charles III and the Pope, Benedict XIV of the validity of their competing claims and charges. At one point Torrubia was jailed in Cuba, but ultimately Spanish royal officials, ecclesiastical authorities, and even the Franciscans in Spain and Rome absolved him of all fault and dismissed the charges brought by the Philippine Franciscans. He went on to hold important positions in Rome, dying there in 1761 with a significant body of published work to his credit.

== Honours ==
In 1825, botanist Vell. published Torrubia (a flowering plant in the family Nyctaginaceae) but it was later classed as a synonym of Guapira. Then in 1885 mycologist, Jean Louis Émile Boudier published Torrubiella, which is a genus of fungi in the family Cordycipitaceae and also named after Jose.
