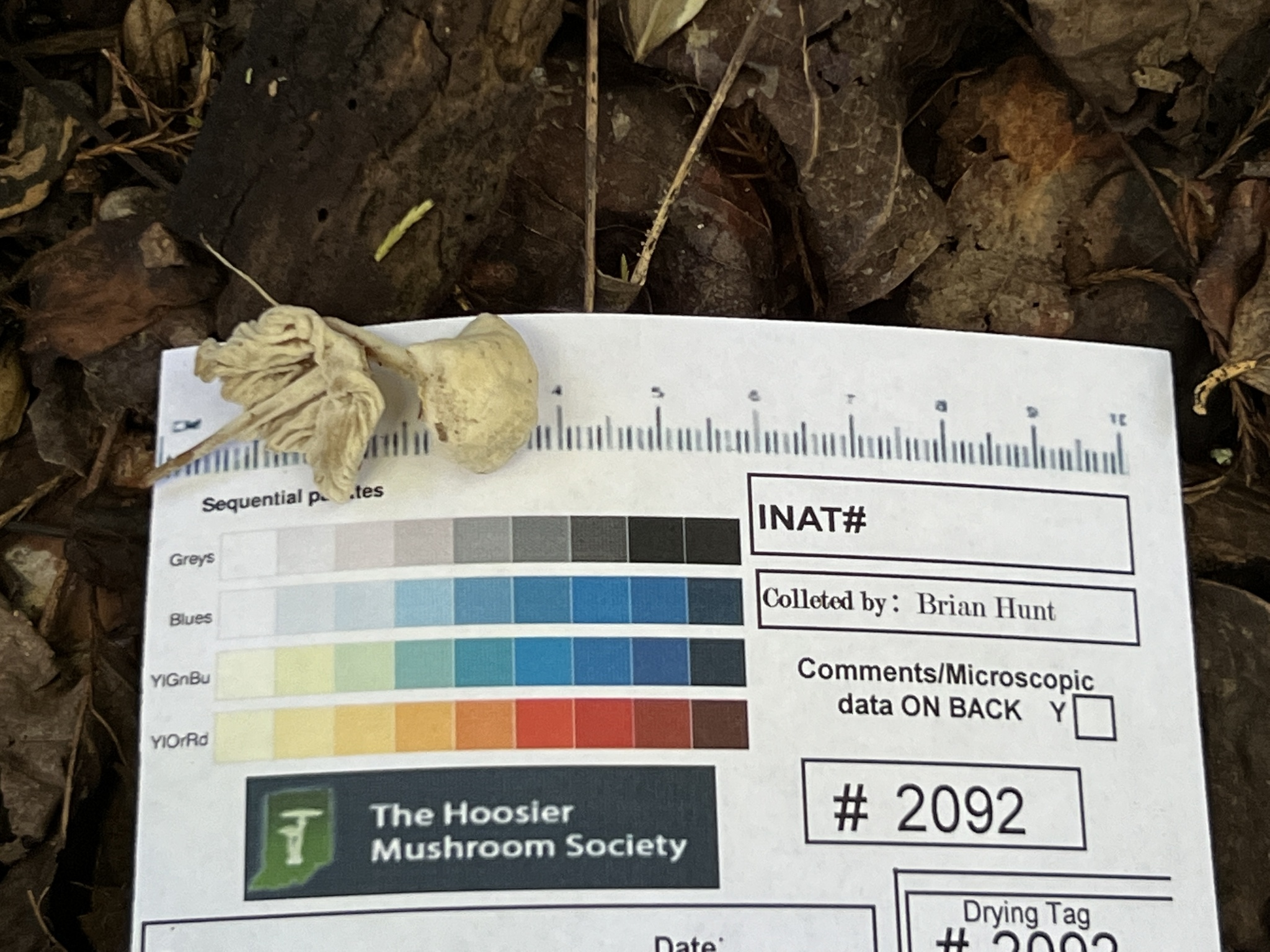

Scientific classification
- Kingdom: Fungi
- Division: Ascomycota
- Class: Sordariomycetes
- Order: Hypocreales
- Family: Cordycipitaceae
- Genus: Lecanicillium
- Species: L. fungicola

Binomial name
- Lecanicillium fungicola (Preuss) Zare & W.Gams (2008)

Synonyms
- Acrostalagmus fungicola Preuss (1851); Cephalosporium costantinii F.E.V.Sm. (1924); Verticillium malthousei Ware (1933); Verticillium fungicola (Preuss) Hassebr. (1936); Verticillium fungicola var. aleophilum W.Gams & Zaayen (1982); Lecanicillium fungicola var. aleophilum (W.Gams & Zaayen) W.Gams & Zare (2008)

= Verticillium dry bubble =

Species of fungus

Verticillium dry bubble, recently named Lecanicillium fungicola, is a mycoparasite that attacks white button mushrooms (Agaricus bisporus), among other hosts, during its generative period. L. fungicola infects the casing layer on the cap structure of several edible mushrooms. This fungal pathogen does not typically infect wild mushrooms, but more commonly cultivated mushrooms are infected such as A. bisporus, which are typically grown in large quantities. Severity of disease depends on several factors, including timing of infection and environmental conditions. Dry bubble follows the typical verticillium life cycle, although insect vectors play a large role in the spread of this disease. Control for L. fungicola is limited, and strict measures must be taken to prevent the spread of infection. L. fungicola is a devastating pathogen in the mushroom industry and causes significant losses in the commercial production of its main host A. bisporus. Annual costs for mushroom growers are estimated at 2–4% of total revenue.

== Host range and symptoms ==
Dry bubble mainly affects three different species of mushrooms: Agaricus bisporus, A. bitorquis, and Pleurotus ostreatus. It has been isolated from numerous other basidiomycetes, including a few wild mushrooms. However, there has not been enough research into dry bubble pathogenicity to define an exact host range.

A. bisporus, white button mushroom, is the main host of Verticillium dry bubble disease. Worldwide, 40% of commercially produced mushrooms are A. bisporus. When infecting A. bisporus, dry bubble is unable to infect the vegetative mycelium and can only infect the fruit bodies. This means infection must take place in the casing layer, a layer of material, usually mulch put on top of the mushroom. In general, dry bubble symptoms are dependent on the time point of infection, affecting both the type and severity of the disease symptoms. Symptoms are mild when inoculation occurs during casing layer applications, and severe when inoculation takes place 14 days after the casing layer has gone down after the mushrooms have poked through.

Interactions between the pathogen and the host in the casing layer can either result in stipe blow-out or dry bubble. Early infections can cause stipe blow-out in which part of the fruit body of the mushroom becomes deformed, accompanied by splitting or peeling of the stipe tissue. L. fungicola also causes totally deformed and undifferentiated white masses of mushroom. If inoculation occurs in the late stage of the mushroom life cycle, symptoms include small necrotic lesions on the cap of the mushroom. Other symptoms may include brown, light brown, or gray discolorations on the cap or the stipe of the mushroom. Infection by L. fungicola does not decrease the weight of the mushroom crop, but has the potential to decrease the total number of mushrooms produced. Therefore, dry bubble is thought of mainly as a cosmetic disease.

== Life cycle ==
The symptoms of infection depend on the developmental stage of which the fungal host becomes infected. Irregularly shaped, light brown necrotic lesions are found on mushroom caps infected later in their development. Characteristic malformed mushrooms, classically known as dry bubble, infection occurred during the early stages of development.

Spread of dry bubble disease is associated with insect vectors. Mites and springtails get stuck on the dry bubbles because their movement becomes impeded by globules of spores stuck to their legs. These insects fly from mushroom cap to cap and spread the conidial L. fungicola spores, which are stuck to their legs from landing on infected mushroom caps.

Sclerotia from L. fungicola can remain viable in the soil for more than a year in natural soil. Most conidial spores do not germinate, and the few that do germinate in soil only have short germ tubes. In sterilized soil and peat, however, spores readily germinate, and after 7 days, extensive mycelium and sporulation is visible. The phenomenon that germination and growth of fungal propagules is inhibited by active soil microorganisms is typical for most soils and is known as soil fungistasis. Germination of L. fungicola spores requires an external nutrient source. Even though spores of the pathogen can germinate in sterile water, germination and germ tube growth are greatly stimulated by the addition of nutrients. It was proposed that carbon is the stimulating factor. Fungistasis is not only caused by nutrient depletion, the production of inhibiting compounds also contributes to inhibition of spore germination. The earliest infestation by the L. fungicola spores can happen as early as casing time, but not before. Usually the spores that land on the deposited compost will not cause disease. It has been observed that even spores that are on the compost before casing do not cause disease development. On the other hand, it has been recently shown that very high populations of spores applied to the compost before casing can induce disease development. Once the casing is applied and rhizomorphs start to mature, then it seems Verticillium spores can become viable and spore source. These asymptomatic mushrooms can carry conidial spores and sclerotia that can be spread by growers, harvesters and other personnel.

== Control ==
=== Hygiene ===
Management and control of dry bubble disease relies mainly on hygiene and prevention of introducing inoculum on mushroom farms. Strict hygiene practices are the best mechanism of control once dry bubble has been identified. Farmers can maintain strict hygiene practices by removing all wastes immediately from the farm. Prevention of mites and flies can help eliminate the spread of the pathogen throughout the crop, because whiteflies and springtails are capable of transporting spores from infected to healthy mushrooms. Casing mixture should be prepared and stored in a clean room away from mushroom wastes, outside soil, insects, and rodents help prevent introduction of the pathogen to the crop.

=== Disease recognition ===
Disease recognition also helps control the disease early on. Once the symptoms of the disease are present in part of the crop, removal of the infected mushrooms is necessary as soon as possible. Teaching harvesters and workers to identify and treat dry bubble disease is a practice that will reduce or eliminate the level of inoculum. All infected mushrooms should especially be removed before harvesting and watering takes place in order to prevent further spread of inoculum on workers' clothes or in splashing water.

=== Fungicides ===
The use of select fungicides to control L. fungicola can be effective by reducing the amount of present inoculum, but there are many issues with this approach. First, few chemicals can be used because all mushroom hosts are naturally sensitive to fungicides. Second, the pathogen has developed resistance to many fungicides over time and they are found to be increasingly less effective. The capability of the fungicide to kill the pathogen has been greatly diminished to a point where fungicide is almost ineffective. For example, L. fungicola has become resistant to benomyl, a common fungicide that is toxic to microorganisms. Third, the use of fungicides to combat L. fungicola may be banned in the near future and not be available to control the pathogen. Legislative involvement is restricting the type of chemical controls that can be used to fight this particular pathogen. The only effective and currently legal chemical control for dry bubble disease is Sporgon (active ingredient: Prochlorax-Manganese). Sensitivity of L. fungicola to Sporgon has decreased, so increasing concentrations of Sporgon must be used to combat dry bubble disease.

=== Resistant strains ===
Resistant strains of A. bisporus to L. fungicola have granted a lot of research but only reveal strains with partial resistance. The commercial and susceptible A. bisporus strain is Sylan A15 and the main partial resistance strain is MES01497. While there are still necrotic lesions present on the cap surface of the brown partial resistant cultivar there has been shown to be less hyphae and sporulation. A lack of pathogen recognition would imply that mushrooms rely on constitutive and wound induced defenses. The response of partially resistant strains of Agaricus are similar to the hypersensitive response in plants where cells in the infected tissue die and encapsulate the infection. The discovery of A. bisporus defense responses might help explain the differences in susceptibility between Sylvan A15 and MES01497. More research is needed to look into additional strains of A. bisporus that show resistance to L. fungicola.

=== Environmental controls ===
Spores of dry bubble are capable of resting for 7–8 months in dry environments without germinating, resulting in a reservoir of inoculum which may reinfect. Three environmental conditions of growth unfavorable to spores may be used in prevention: anaerobic conditions, low PH, or high temperatures above 40 °C. Anaerobic conditions and high temperatures may both be achieved by heated composting of casing and debris which is removed from the growing area in order to eliminate viable spores. In between crops, steam treatments of the growing area can effectively eliminate inoculum; this technique is best used when the facility can be completely sealed and heated in between crops.

=== New methods ===
Another management technique that has been recently researched is the use of volatile 1-octen-3-ol on infected hosts of L. fungicola. While more research is needed to contribute its effects on management, it has been shown that 1-octen-3-ol inhibits the germination of L. fungicola and that enhanced levels can effectively control the pathogen. Another function of 1-octen-3-ol, is that application stimulates growth of bacterial populations in the casing and of the Pseudomonas spp., demonstrated to play part in the onset of mushroom formation in A. bisporus.

== Environment ==
Environmental conditions within the growing area can greatly affect the rate of growth and spread of dry bubble. Most importantly, factors of RH (relative humidity) and temperature are most important. Dry bubble favors warm, humid environments for growth. This coincides with environmental preferences of white button mushroom, its primary host, which favors a RH of 85% and warm temperatures of 25 °C. Given that dry bubble cannot actively grow without a host, this is logical; however, it makes the use of environmental controls of the pathogen challenging. If timed well with harvest, dry bubble may be suppressed to some degree by controlling the environment. If RH is lowered 10% and temperature lowered 5–10 °C, the growth of pathogenic mycelia and germination of spores may be slowed with minimal impact to harvest. However, it is inevitable that any environmental alterations which affect dry bubble will similarly affect the mushroom crop which is its host.

== Importance ==
Verticillium dry bubble is the most prevalent disease of A. bisporus, and the most serious fungal pathogen of all commercial mushrooms. Commercial losses to white button mushroom growers are 2–4% of annual revenue. If dry bubble infects and is left uncontrolled in the mushroom growing environment, the disease can wipe out an entire crop in 2–3 weeks. Moreover, the disease may be devastating for years following the initial infection because spores are capable of resting in debris and reinfecting crop to crop.

Dry bubble was first detected in a commercial planting in North America in 1981. However, literature on dry bubble has been published in India as early as 1960, proving that it has been an economic problem for mushroom growers during much of the 20th century. Dry bubble is thought to originate from North America or Europe, and is prevalent on both continents. Because few fungicides are effective and even fewer are legal, dry bubble is likely to remain the most critical disease to mushroom growers in Europe and North America in the future unless breakthroughs in research are made.
