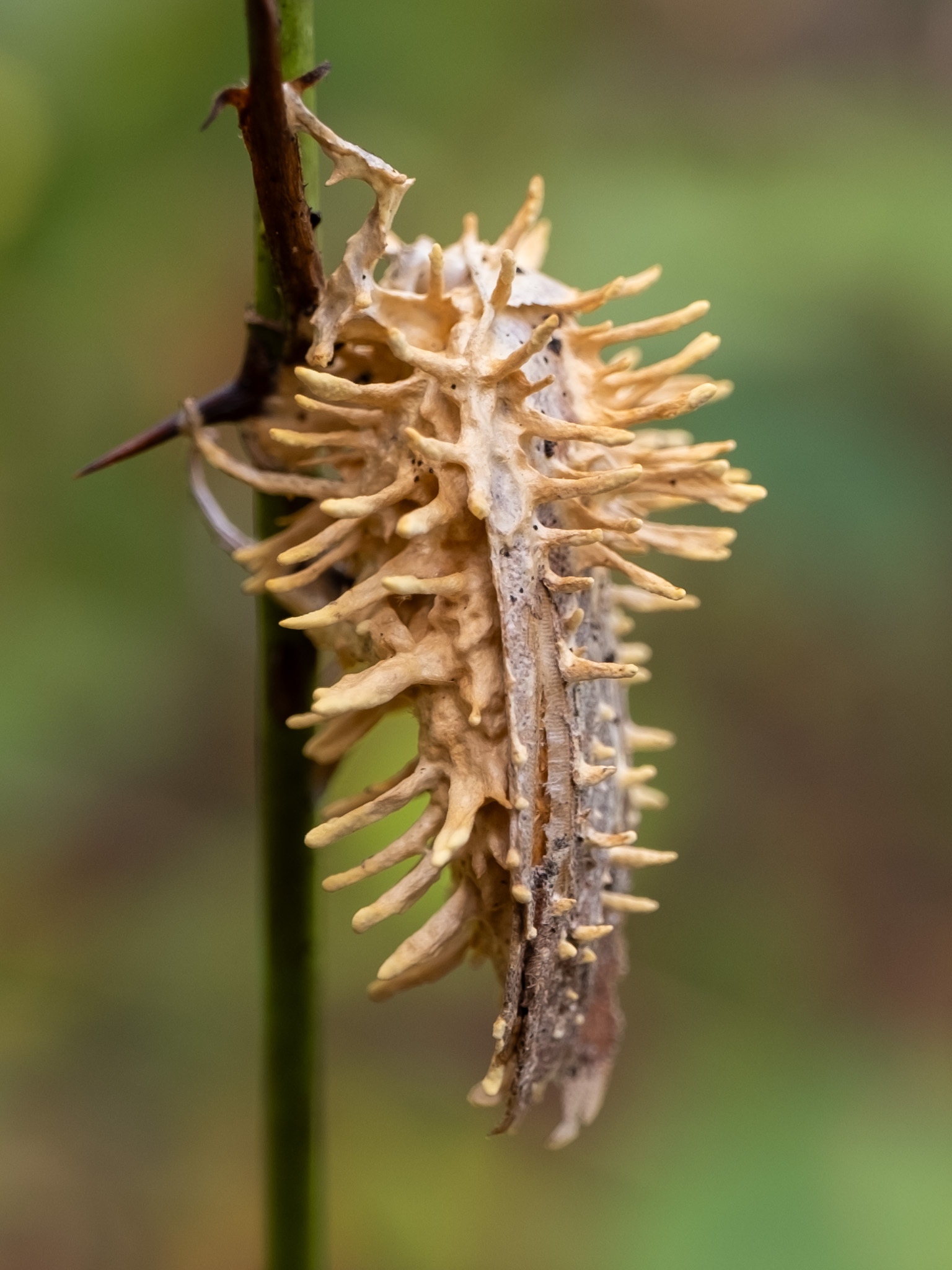
- Akanthomyces aculeatus consuming a moth

Scientific classification
- Kingdom: Fungi
- Division: Ascomycota
- Class: Sordariomycetes
- Order: Hypocreales
- Family: Cordycipitaceae
- Genus: Akanthomyces
- Species: A. aculeatus

Binomial name
- Akanthomyces aculeatus Lebert

= Akanthomyces aculeatus =

Species of fungus

Akanthomyces aculeatus is a species of fungus belonging to the family Cordycipitaceae.

It is native to Europe and America.
