= Verticillium klebahnii =

Scientific classification
- Kingdom: Fungi
- Division: Ascomycota
- Class: Sordariomycetes
- Order: Glomerellales
- Family: Plectosphaerellaceae
- Genus: Verticillium
- Species: V. klebahnii

Binomial name
- Verticillium klebahnii Inderb., Bostock, R.M. Davis & K.V. Subbarao

Species of fungus

Verticillium klebahnii is a fungus often pathogenically inhabiting lettuce. It causes verticillium wilt (a disease state) in some plant species. It produces yellow-pigmented hyphae and microsclerotia, while producing abundant chlamydospores and resting mycelium. It is most closely related to V. tricorpus and V. isaacii.
