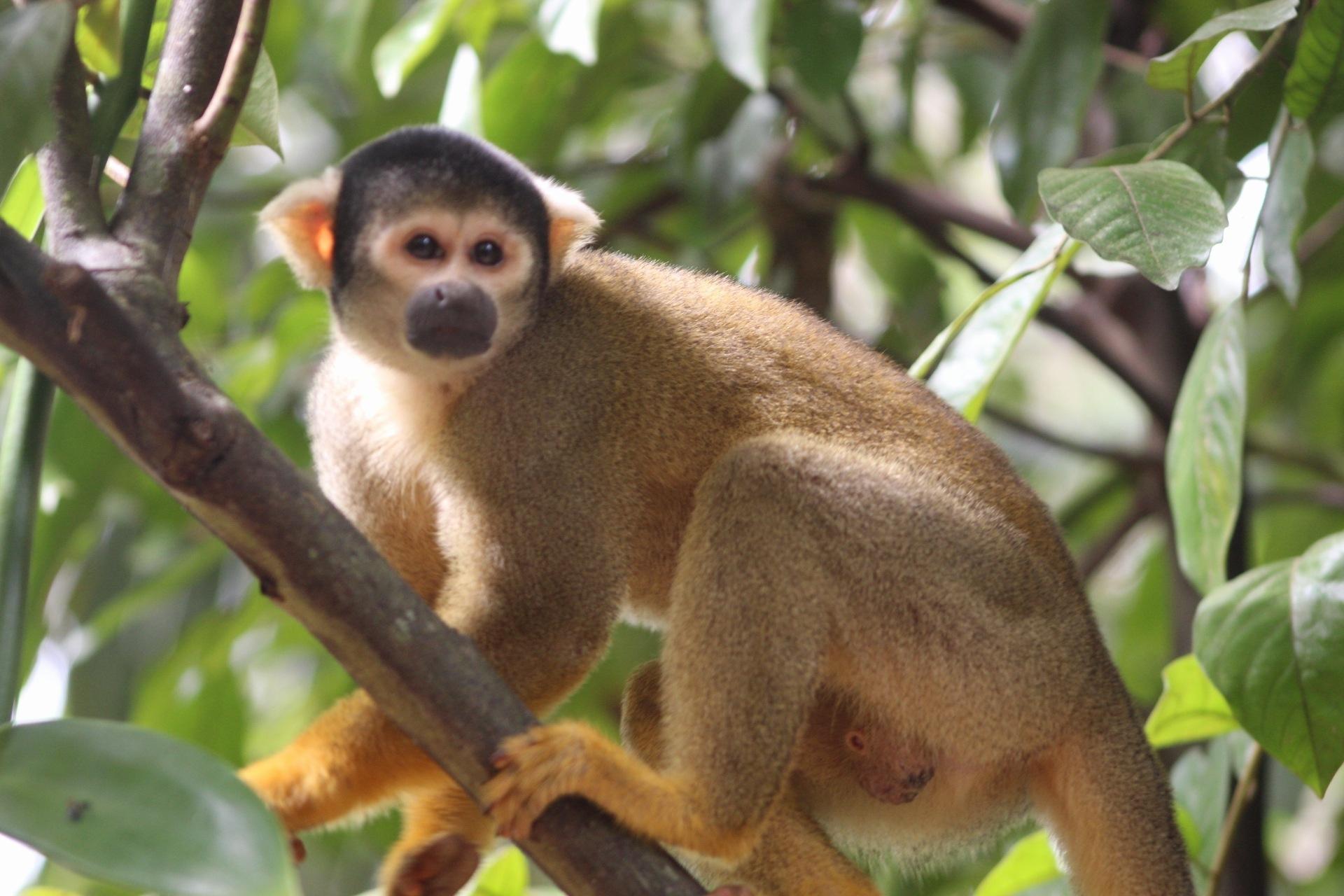

Conservation status
- Least Concern (IUCN 3.1)

Scientific classification
- Kingdom: Animalia
- Phylum: Chordata
- Class: Mammalia
- Infraclass: Placentalia
- Order: Primates
- Family: Cebidae
- Genus: Saimiri
- Species: S. boliviensis

Binomial name
- Saimiri boliviensis (I. Geoffroy & Blainville, 1834)
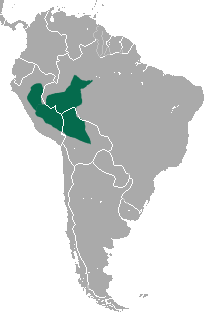
- Geographic range

Synonyms
- Saimiri sciureus boliviensis; Callithrix boliviensis; Callithrix entomophagus; Saimiri boliviensis nigriceps; Saimiri boliviensis pluvialis

= Black-capped squirrel monkey =

Species of New World monkey

The black-capped squirrel monkey (Saimiri boliviensis) is a species of New-World monkey native to the upper Amazon basin in Bolivia, western Brazil and eastern Peru. They weigh between 365 and 1,135 g (13 and 40 oz) and measure, from the head to the base of the tail, between 225 and 370 mm (9 and 15 in). The black-capped squirrel monkey is primarily tree-dwelling and is found in both native and plantation forests as well as some farmed areas near running water. Its diet is omnivorous and mostly consists of flowers, fruit, leaves, nuts, seeds, insects, arachnids, eggs and small vertebrates. It mostly lives in female-dominated troops of around 40 to 75 monkeys, with males having been observed to disperse to live in all-male troops after reaching sexual maturation. Its current conservation status according to the International Union for Conservation of Nature (IUCN) is 'Least Concern'. The species belongs to the genus Saimiri and has two subspecies, S. b. boliviensis (the Bolivian squirrel monkey) and S. b. peruviensis (the Peruvian squirrel monkey).

== Description ==
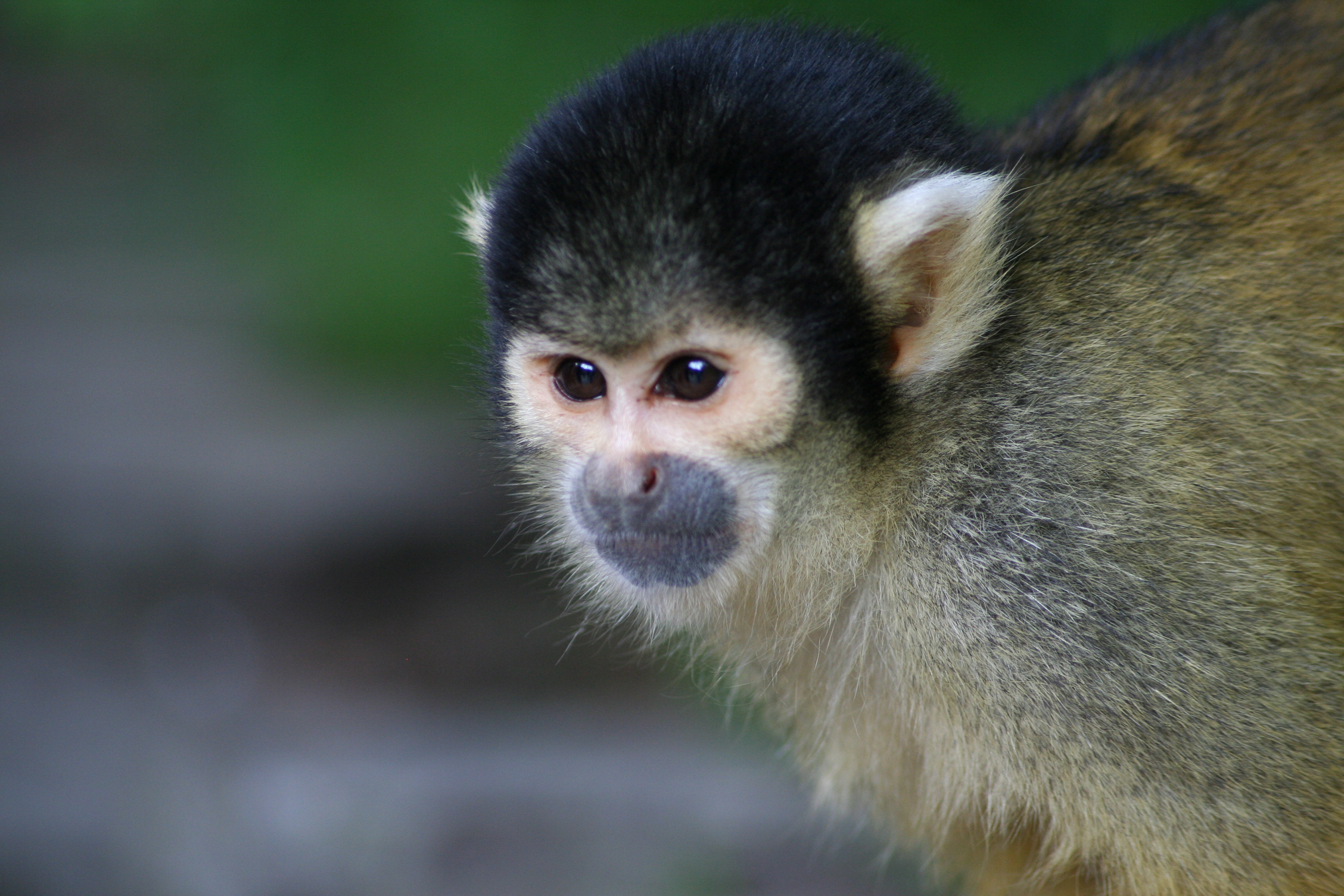
The black-capped squirrel monkey exhibits the rounded 'Roman type' white arch pattern over the eyes.

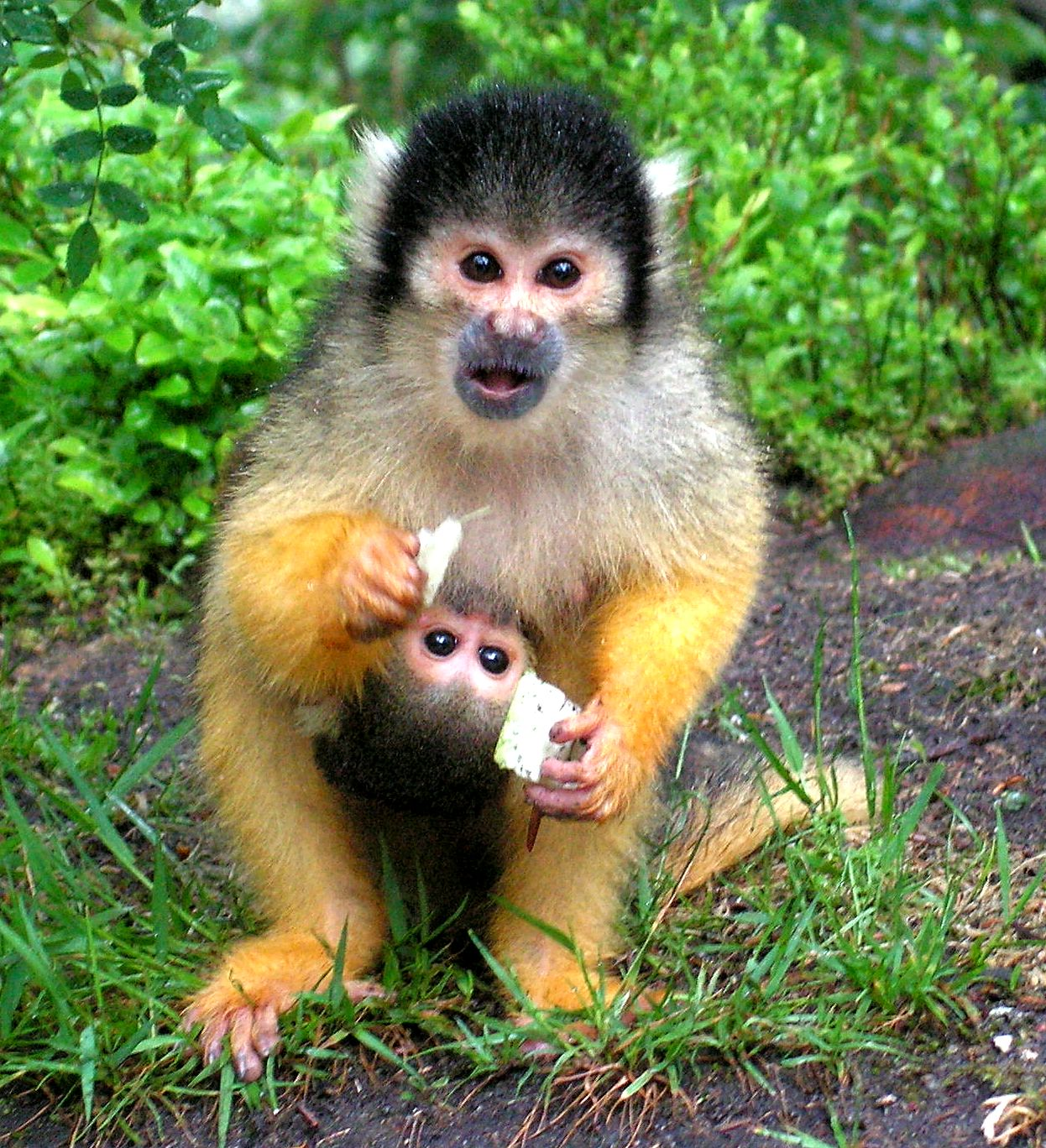
Female Black-Capped Squirrel Monkey & Infant

The black-capped squirrel monkey displays sexual dimorphism, with males normally weighing between 550 and 1,135 g (19.4 and 40.0 oz) and females weighing between 365 and 750 g (12.9 and 26.5 oz). Infants typically weigh between 80 and 140 g (2.8 and 4.9 oz) when they are born. Adults of the species measure in length (from the head to the base of the tail) between 250 and 370 mm (9.8 and 14.6 in) for males and 225 and 295 mm (8.9 and 11.6 in) for females. The coat of the monkey is short, soft and dense, and the majority of the fur covering the back of the monkey is a grey to olive-brown hue, while the undersides are typically white, yellow or ochre. The head is characteristically black with white arches over the eyes. The tail is the same colour as the body with a black tufted tip and is not prehensile; it usually measures around 350 to 425 mm (13.8 to 16.7 in).

Physically, the black-capped squirrel monkey is very similar to a number of other species of squirrel monkey, but is distinguishable from other species by a number of features. The most noticeable of these are the dark black cap and the white 'Roman type' arch pattern over the monkey's eyes, which is more narrow and rounded than the 'Gothic type' arch pattern over the eyes of the other species. The tail of the 'Roman type' species is also narrower than that of the 'Gothic type'.

== Evolution ==
Saimiri boliviensis is thought to have emerged in the Saimiri genus approximately 1.5 million years ago. It has been hypothesised that this diversification occurred due to environmental changes in the Pleistocene period which allowed for thicker vegetation to appear in the Amazonian rainforest.

=== Fossils ===
Several different fossils have been linked to the genus Saimiri through examinations of their dental and cranial morphology, including the Early Miocene fossil Dolichocebus which was discovered in Gaiman, Argentina and dated to around 20.5 million years ago, and the Middle Miocene fossil of the genus Neosaimiri discovered in La Venta, Colombia, which has been dated to between 12.1 and 12.5 million years ago.

=== Taxonomic classification ===
Originally all squirrel monkeys were considered to be of the same species; they were first divided into two different 'types' – 'Roman' and 'Gothic' – in 1964. Many different opinions on the taxonomic classification of Saimiri boliviensis as a separate species have been published, however various studies conducted by several researchers have concluded that Saimiri boliviensis is one of at most seven different species of Saimiri. Based on the geographical distribution and the morphological and behavioural characteristics of the specimens studied, Hershkovitz proposed the existence of Saimiri boliviensis as a distinct species with two sub-species, Saimiri boliviensis boliviensis and Saimiri boliviensis peruviensis. Based on cranial measurements and coat colouring, Thorington proposed Saimiri sciureus boliviensis as a sub-species of Saimiri sciureus. Another prominent report published in 1993 supports Thorington's classification, however after further investigation into the genetic characteristics of the monkey a more recently published report concludes that Hershkovitz's description is the most accurate. The dispute over the taxonomic and genetic classification of the black-capped squirrel monkey has become increasingly relevant with regards to their use in biomedical research, due to the fact that hybridisation may have an effect on the reproductive capabilities of the monkey, and has the potential to cause a differentiation in its susceptibility to certain pathogens and infections.

Alternative or previously proposed taxonomic names include:

- Saimiri sciureus boliviensis
- Callithrix boliviensis (monkeys from Bolivia)
- Callithrix entomophagus (monkeys from Tefé, Brazil)
- Saimiri boliviensis nigriceps (monkeys from Cosnipata, Peru)
- Saimiri boliviensis pluvialis (monkeys from the Rio Jurua in Brazil)

== Distribution and habitat ==
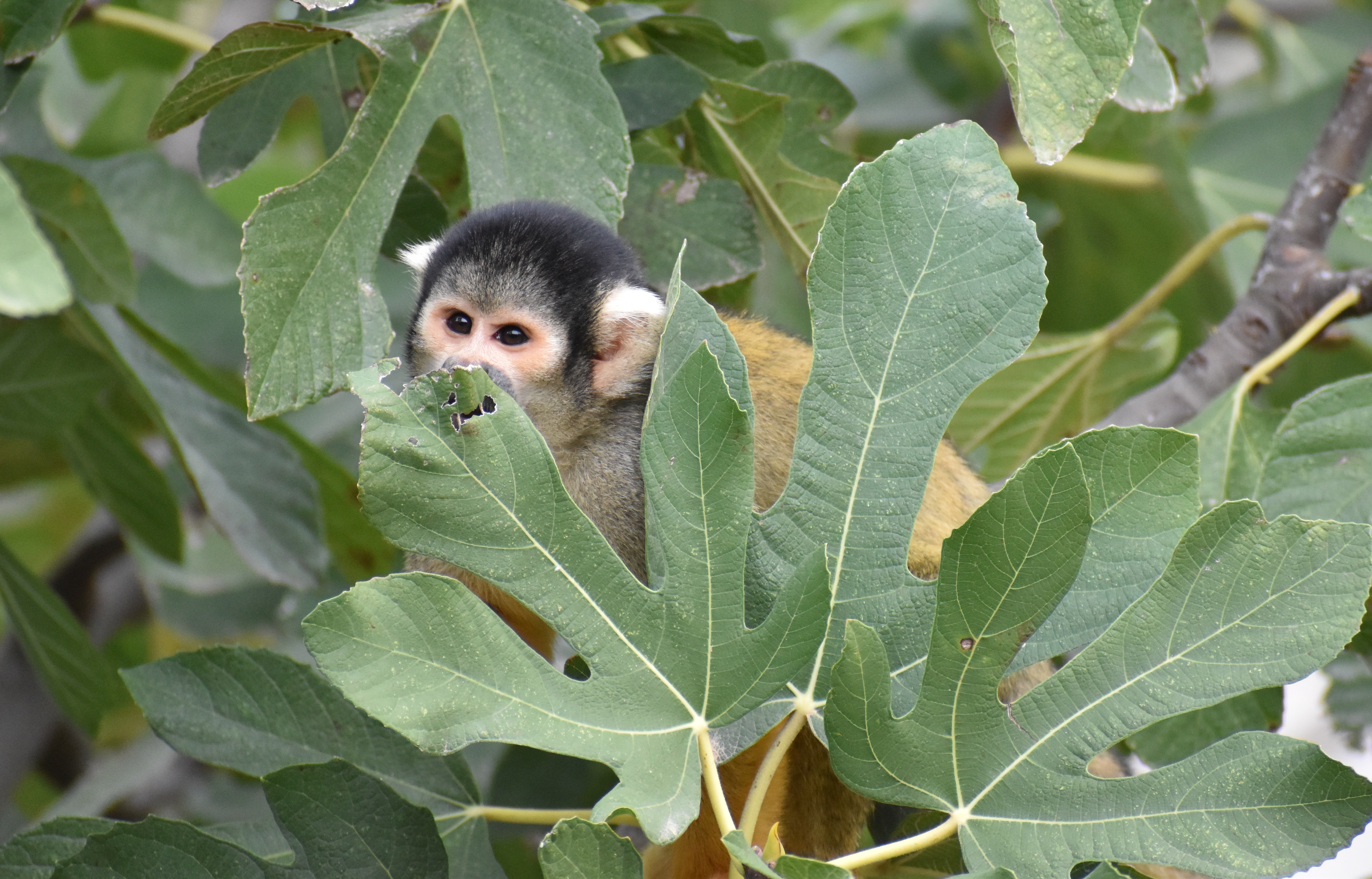
The black-capped squirrel monkey is typically arboreal.

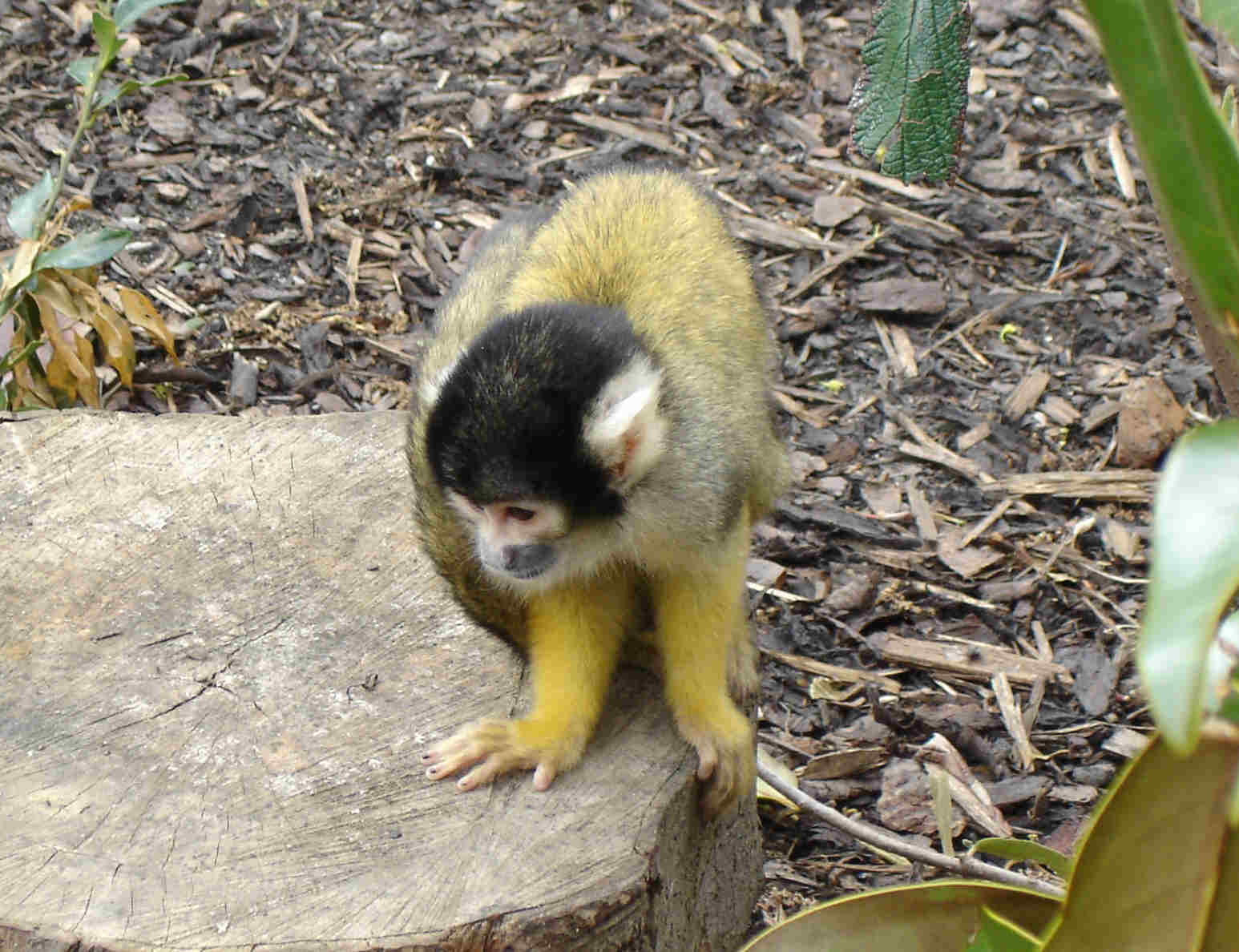
Black-Capped Squirrel Monkey In London Zoo, UK.

Saimiri displaying the characteristic 'Roman arch' facial pattern of the black-capped squirrel monkey have been documented throughout most of Bolivia, northern Peru, and between the Jurua and Purus Rivers in Brazil. The species is found in lowland tropical rainforests near water in densely forested and swampy regions. It is predominantly arboreal, and while it utilises all levels of the forests, it has been observed to keep mostly to the lower canopies for the purposes of travel and foraging. It has been proposed that matrilineal troops of Saimiri boliviensis are formed due to an abundance of fruit and insects present in their habitat, which is not present in the habitats of other species of the Saimiri genus.

== Biology ==
Saimiri boliviensis are mostly arboreal but will occasionally also be found on the forest floor. They are diurnal and have been observed to be most active during the early to mid-morning, before resting for one or two hours in the afternoon, followed by another period of activity from the early afternoon to evening.

=== Social systems ===
The black-capped squirrel monkey is found in female dominated troops of around 45 to 75 monkeys, unlike its relative the Common squirrel monkey which habitually lives in male dominated troops of around 15 to 50. Similar to most other species of monkeys, female Saimiri boliviensis will remain in the troop into which they are born, while males are more likely to be excluded by more dominant females. When they reach sexual maturity, male Black-capped squirrel monkeys will disperse from their natal troop into smaller all-male groups, and will eventually join a larger mixed-sex troop, often together with other males from the all-male group. The females use an egalitarian social structure instead of a dominant hierarchy and will actively exclude males to the periphery of the group. Black-capped squirrel monkey troops display high levels of aggression between females. Female monkeys will often compete with other female members of the troop to determine access to resources, however it has been observed that despite heavy competition for food they still prefer to live in large groups in order to reduce the likelihood of predation.

Often black-capped squirrel monkeys will socialize with other species of monkeys: primarily Cebus and Saguinus monkeys for the benefits of their alerting behavior and access to resources. Cebus has a distinct and developed predator alarm system that is highly accurate. Saimiri boliviensis benefits from this because their alerts are more likely to be false alarms, and the extra surveillance during feeding increases their chance of survival. This is important because Saimiri boliviensis forage quickly and the males have little genetic stake in protecting group members; thus, both factors leave members more vulnerable to predators. Secondly, squirrel monkeys receive more access to resources by staying with Cebus and Saguinus. The other species can forage large fruits and nuts that are normally too hard for squirrel monkeys to access. Furthermore, the Cebus monkeys are better at finding ripe fruit crops. The relationships between these species are usually nonhostile, but when food is scarce or the foraging areas are small, there can be increased aggression towards Saimiri boliviensis by the other species due to feelings of possession over the discovered feeding site. In these instances, Saimiri boliviensis are only scared away temporarily and not fully excluded.

=== Reproduction ===
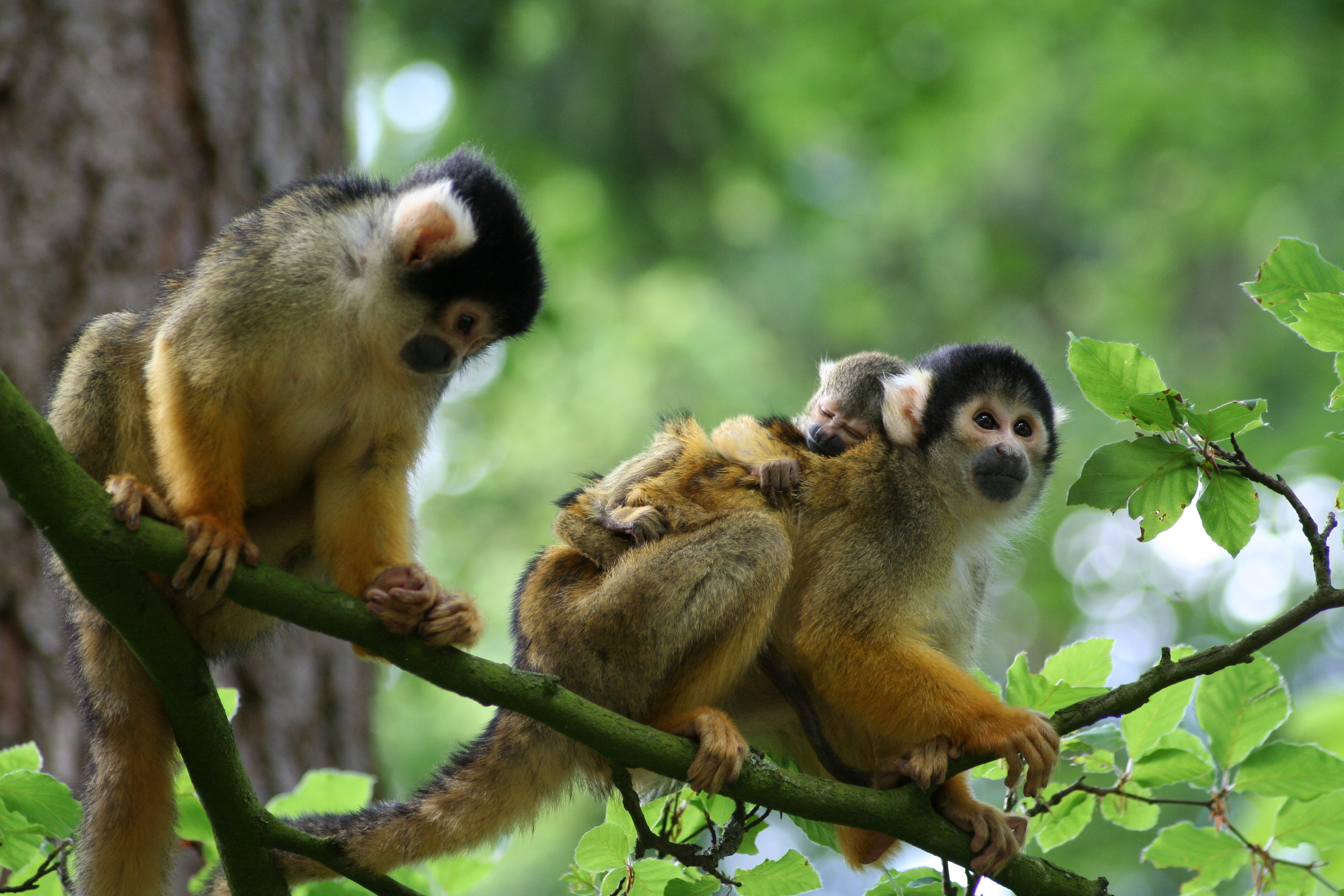
A family of Saimiri boliviensis

A Black-capped squirrel monkey will typically reach sexual maturation at around 3 years of age for females and 5 years of age for males. The yearly reproductive cycle of mature Saimiri has been observed by several researchers to be affected by a number of environmental factors, including the cycles of rainfall and levels of illumination in their habitat. The mating season coincides with the dry season, and will typically result in a single infant being born to each mother. It has been suggested that adult female monkeys are more receptive to environmental cues for the mating season to begin, and the response in males is in part attributed to behavioural and scent cues from the females. During the mating season, males of the species will gain a large amount of subcutaneous upper body fat, leading to what is known as a 'fatted' appearance. It has also been observed that the testosterone levels of monkeys of the Bolivian and Peruvian species are noticeably higher during the mating season than those of other species of male Saimiri from Guayana. Males will become more irritable and aggressive, fight more frequently for the purpose of achieving dominance within the troop, and engage in genital display towards less dominant males. It has been observed in both natural and laboratory settings that the hierarchy of the troop may change up to as often as three times in a month, and this will often result in highly aggressive fights which may lead to the complete exclusion of younger adult males from the troop. The scent and behavioural cues of a female monkey assist a male in his judgement of whether or not she will be receptive to his approach and attempt at mating with her. If she is not receptive, the female, sometimes with the aid of other nearby females, will usually chase the male away. Consorting and copulation between a male and female monkey may last between one minute and over an hour depending on the presence of other monkeys and the environment in which it takes place. The gestation period of the monkey has been estimated to last between 160 and 170 days. During the first week following its birth, an infant monkey will cling to its mother's back and will seldom move or be attended to by the mother unless it is in some way in need of assistance.

=== Communication ===
Squirrel monkeys have been found to be some of the most vocal primates, with a large range of different types of calls documented throughout their lifespan. Commonly used sounds include 'chucks', a variety of purrs and squawks elicited during the birthing and mating seasons, chirps and peeps used for alarm or attention, as well as aggressive screaming and 'barking'. Infant Black-capped squirrel monkeys tend to vocally communicate much more than adults. The most common form of infant communication is a number of different 'peeps', which begin to occur most frequently at around 2 months of age when the infant starts to spend more time away from its mother. After maturation, the most commonly used call for adult females is a variety of 'chucks', used to maintain contact in dense vegetation where visual identification is not possible.

=== Food and foraging ===
Black-capped squirrel monkeys are omnivorous. A typical squirrel monkey diet includes fruits, insects, eggs, small vertebrates, arachnids, leaves, flowers, nuts, seeds, and rarely fungi; however it has been observed that they prefer insects to fruit. Mature Saimiri spend most of the day foraging. They will begin foraging at around 60 to 40 minutes before sunrise and will spend the first part of the day actively feeding on fruits and any insects they are able to hunt while foraging for fruit. They will then adopt more sedate feeding behaviors and spend the rest of the day resting and hunting for more insects. Often, when food is not scarce, they will stop and rest for an hour or two in the middle of the day when it is too hot to continue. When fruits are scarce, squirrel monkeys have been reported to consume Ascopolyporus, a fungus that is parasitic on scale insects which are parasitic to local bamboo species. Researchers formulate that this is done as an alternative food source during dry seasons.

=== Locomotion ===
Black-capped squirrel monkeys are mostly found in trees and will often leap 1–2 metres between branches. They are capable of moving swiftly through dense vegetation at a four-legged walk or run with diagonal sequence footfalls (wherein the hind leg on one side will touch down followed by the foreleg of the opposite side). They will occasionally adopt a stationary bipedal stance at ground level while foraging. The monkey's tail is usually used for balance, or by infants to secure them to their mother's tail or abdomen.

== Impact on the ecosystem ==
Due to their diets, the black-capped squirrel monkey is an important disperser species and insect predator species in the Amazon. General research has determined that primates, especially in the neotropics, are effective seed dispersers and contributors to forest regeneration by transporting seeds away from their parent plant, which reduces competition for space and resources, enhances gene flow, and affects the germination period. Primates can spread thousands or even millions of seeds per hectare per year, and the black-capped squirrel monkey forages quickly and travels great distances in a single day. Saimiri boliviensis also assists in regulating insect populations as insect predators by foraging for insects and small vertebrates from leaves and trees. Thus, those populations do not become too rampant in any one part of the forest.

== Conservation status ==
The black-capped squirrel monkey population has been listed as being of 'Least Concern' by the IUCN, despite population numbers being in a general state of decline. It has been determined that the black-capped squirrel monkey adapts easily to changes or potential threats to its environment, and is not subject to high levels of hunting by humans. According to the IUCN, the main threats to the habitat of the monkey are agricultural and aquacultural uses of their habitat, and the use of the monkey's biological resources for purposes such as hunting, trapping, logging and wood harvesting.

== See also ==
- Miss Baker
