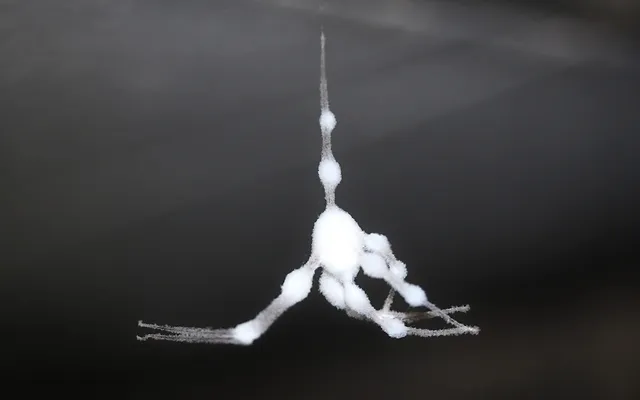

Scientific classification
- Kingdom: Fungi
- Division: Ascomycota
- Class: Sordariomycetes
- Order: Hypocreales
- Family: Cordycipitaceae
- Genus: Lecanicillium
- Species: L. tenuipes

Binomial name
- Lecanicillium tenuipes (Petch) Zare & W. Gams

Synonyms
- Acremonium tenuipes Petch; Verticillium tenuipes (Petch) W. Gams; Engyodontium aranearum (Cavara) W. Gams, de Hoog, Samson & H.C. Evans; Sporotrichum aranearum Cavara

= Lecanicillium tenuipes =

Species of fungus

Lecanicillium tenuipes is a species of ascomycete fungus in the family Cordycipitaceae. Engyodontium aranearum was synonymized to this species in 2001.

It is one of many species of fungal pathogens that infect spiders. It parasitizes the long-bodied cellar spider (Pholcus phalangioides). It causes 100% mortality in infected spiders.

== See also ==
- Entomopathogenic fungus
- Parasitoid
