= Verticillium zaregamsianum =

Scientific classification
- Kingdom: Fungi
- Division: Ascomycota
- Class: Sordariomycetes
- Order: Glomerellales
- Family: Plectosphaerellaceae
- Genus: Verticillium
- Species: V. zaregamsianum

Binomial name
- Verticillium zaregamsianum Inderb. et al.

Species of fungus

Verticillium zaregamsianum is a fungus often found in lettuce in Japan. It can cause verticillium wilt in some plant species. It produces yellow-pigmented hyphae and microsclerotia, while producing few chlamydospores and with sparse resting mycelium. It is most closely related to V. tricorpus.
