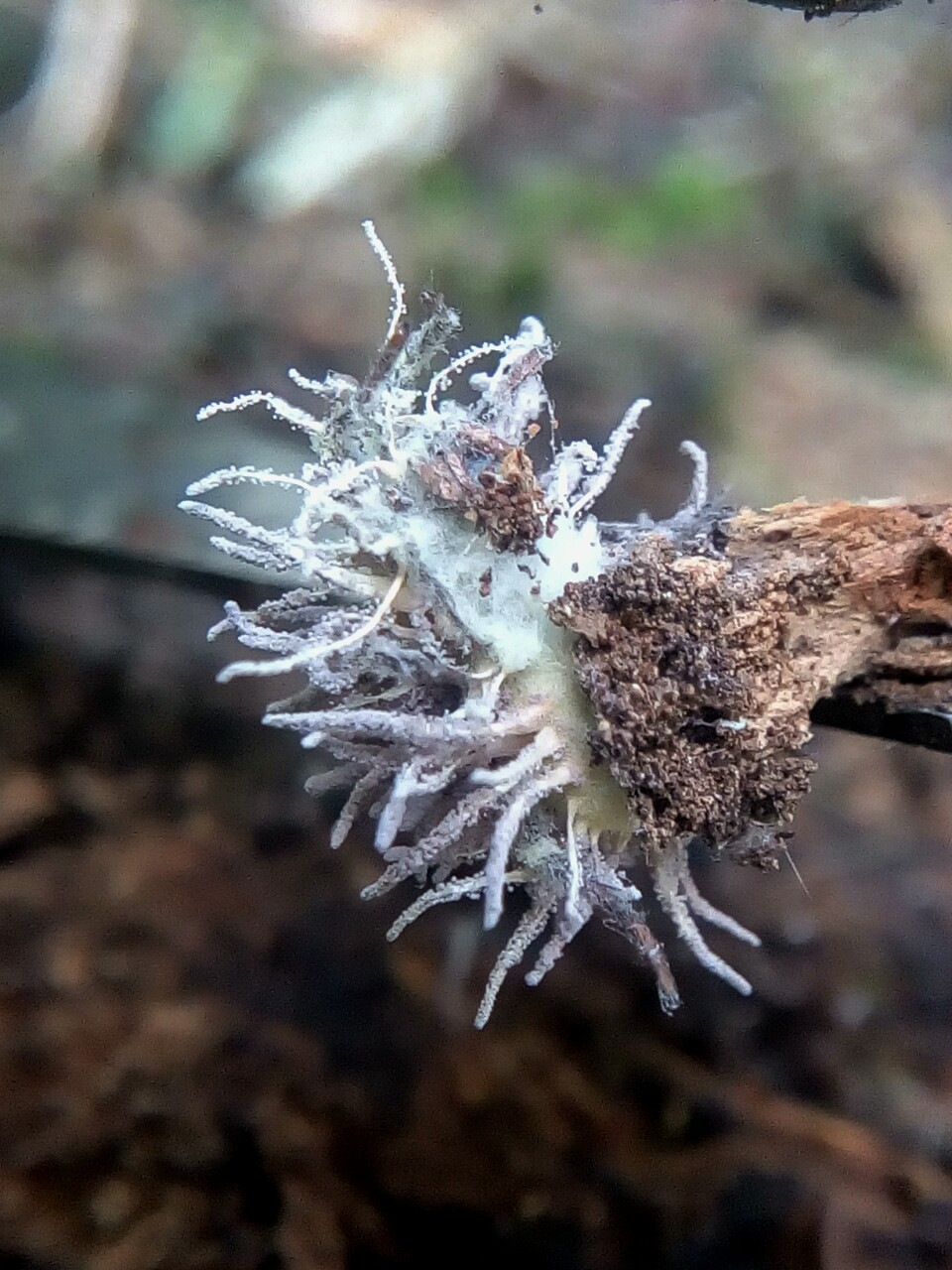

Scientific classification
- Kingdom: Fungi
- Division: Ascomycota
- Class: Sordariomycetes
- Order: Hypocreales
- Family: Cordycipitaceae
- Genus: Gibellula
- Species: G. pulchra

Binomial name
- Gibellula pulchra (Sacc.) Cavara (1894)

Synonyms
- Corethropsis pulchra Sacc. (1877)

= Gibellula pulchra =

Species of parasitic fungus

Gibellula pulchra is a species of parasitoid fungus found on arachnids. The species Gibellula pulchra is commonly found around the world.

The genus Gibellula was named after Prof. Giuseppe Gibelli. Some researchers have mistaken Gibellula suffulata as Gibellula pulchra though they are different species from the same genus that both prey on arachnids. Specimens of Gibellula pulchra from North America are held in various collections facilities: the Herbarium of the University of Michigan, Herbarium of Cornell University, Mycological Collection of the U.S. Bureau of Plant Industry, Herbarium of the New York Botanical Garden, and Farlow Herbarium.

== Habitat ==
Like other ascomycetes, Gibellula pulchra can be found under stones, bark, leaves, on decaying logs, or in hidden burrows of plant matter on the forest floor. Often Gibellula pulchra is more clearly identified after entering an arachnid, enveloping their host, and growing on their cadavers. Once a spider dies from the Gibellula pulchra pathogenic fungi, G. pulchra produces a large fruiting body out of the cadaver.

== Biology ==
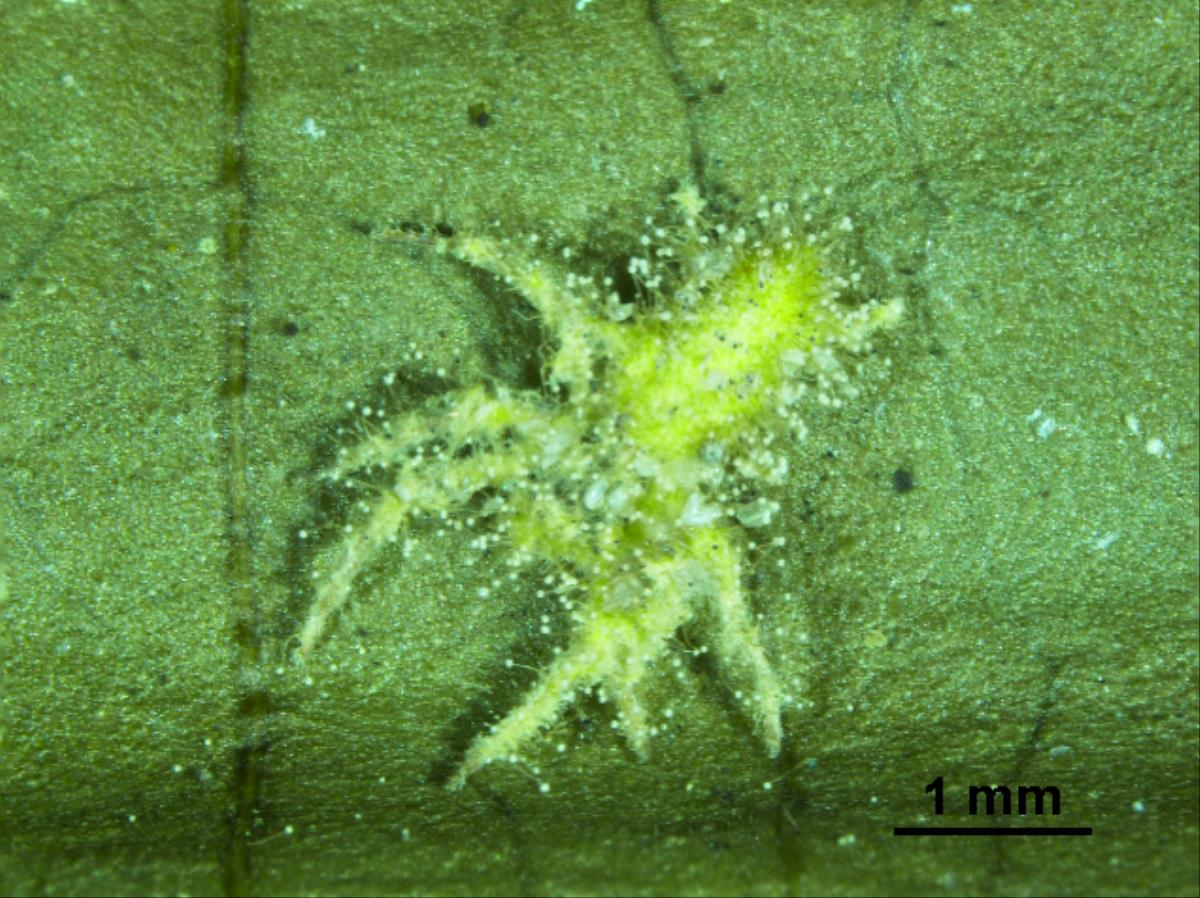
Gibellula pulchra

Gibellula is a parasitoid from the Cordycipitaceae family. In order to attach to a host, Gibellula pulchra sends out spores. When an unlucky spider comes in contact with a spore from Gibellula pulchra, the spores germinate on and envelop the spider host. After germinating, Gibellula pulchra penetrates the host body with a yellow coat of mycelium and digests the spider from the inside out. When the spider has died, stiff lavender clavae begin to shoot up out of the spider cadaver. Gibellula pulchra does not digest the exoskeletons of arachnids which is why the shape of the spider is still visible after Gibellula pulchra has enveloped and killed its host. Not long after the spider host dies, the colors of the mycelium and clavae fade to a cream or ashy color.
