= Verticillium isaacii =

Scientific classification
- Kingdom: Fungi
- Division: Ascomycota
- Class: Sordariomycetes
- Order: Glomerellales
- Family: Plectosphaerellaceae
- Genus: Verticillium
- Species: V. isaacii

Binomial name
- Verticillium isaacii Inder. et al.

Species of fungus

Verticillium isaacii is a fungus inhabiting artichoke, spinach and lettuce, without necessarily being pathogenic. It causes verticillium wilt in some plant species. It produces yellow-pigmented hyphae and microsclerotia, while producing abundant chlamydospores and resting mycelium. It is most closely related to V. tricorpus and V. klebahnii.
