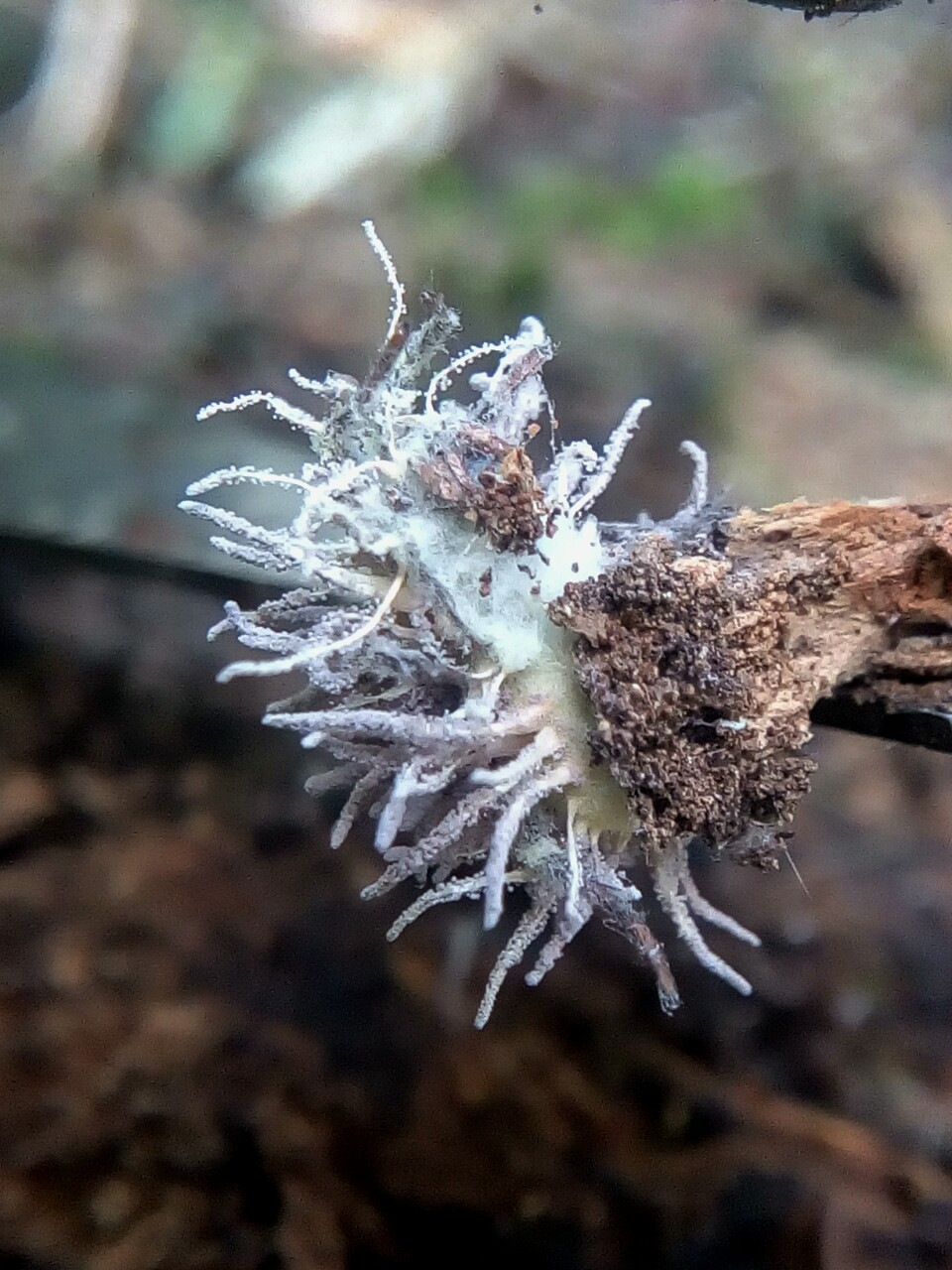
- Gibellula pulchra

Scientific classification
- Kingdom: Fungi
- Division: Ascomycota
- Class: Sordariomycetes
- Order: Hypocreales
- Family: Cordycipitaceae
- Genus: Gibellula; Cavara (1894)

= Gibellula =

Genus of parasitic fungus

Gibellula is a genus of parasitic fungi which attacks arachnids.

The genus Gibellula was named after Giuseppe Gibelli.

== Species ==
- Gibellula alata
- Gibellula arachnophila
- Gibellula aranearum
- Gibellula attenboroughii
- Gibellula clavata
- Gibellula clavulifera
- Gibellula dabieshanensis
- Gibellula dimorpha
- Gibellula eximia
- Gibellula leiopus
- Gibellula pulchra
