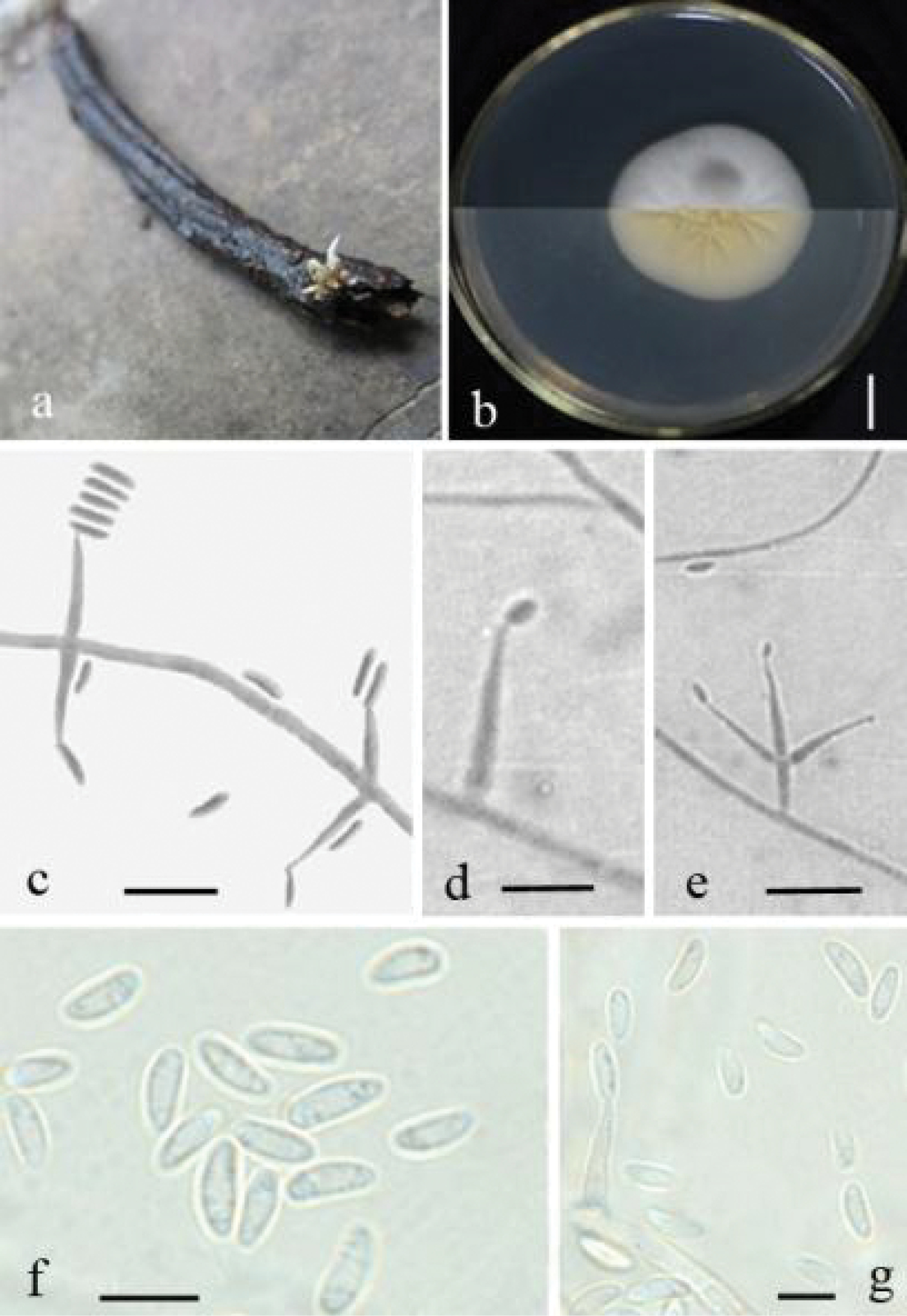
- Lecanicillium cauligalbarum. a Synnemata emerged from the corpse of a stemborer (Lepidoptera) b Culture plate, showing the front (upper) and the back (lower) of the colony, cultured on PDA medium c–e Phialides solitary or in 2–3 whorls f–g Conidia. Scale bars: 10 mm (b, c, e), 5 μm (d, f, g)

Scientific classification
- Kingdom: Fungi
- Division: Ascomycota
- Class: Sordariomycetes
- Order: Hypocreales
- Family: Cordycipitaceae
- Genus: Lecanicillium; W.Gams & Zare (2001)

Type species
- Lecanicillium lecanii (Zimm.) Zare & W.Gams (2001)

= Lecanicillium =

Genus of fungi

Lecanicillium is a genus of fungi in the order Hypocreales and is described as anamorphic Cordycipitaceae; 21 species are currently described. Some of these entomopathogenic fungus species were previously widely known as Verticillium lecanii (Zimmerman) Viegas. This genus was first named and introduced by Rasoul Zare (IRIPP) and Walter Gams (CBS).

== Species ==
The IndexFungorum records the following species:

- Lecanicillium acerosum W. Gams, H.C. Evans & Zare 2001
- Lecanicillium antillanum (R.F. Castañeda & G.R.W. Arnold) Zare & W. Gams 2001
- Lecanicillium aphanocladii Zare & W. Gams 2001
- Lecanicillium aranearum (Petch) Zare & W. Gams 2001
- Lecanicillium araneicola Sukarno & Kurihara 2009
- Lecanicillium attenuatum Zare & W. Gams 2001
- Lecanicillium dimorphum (J.D. Chen) Zare & W. Gams 2001
- Lecanicillium evansii Zare & W. Gams 2001
- Lecanicillium flavidum (W. Gams & Zaayen) W. Gams & Zare 2008
- Lecanicillium fungicola (Preuss) Zare & W. Gams 2008; anamorphic Cordycipitaceae
- Lecanicillium fusisporum (W. Gams) Zare & W. Gams 2001
- Lecanicillium kalimantanense Kurihara & Sukarno 2009
- Lecanicillium lecanii (Zimm.) Zare & W. Gams 2001: pathogens of soft scale insects (Coccidae)
- Lecanicillium longisporum (Petch) Zare & W. Gams 2001: pathogens of aphids
- Lecanicillium muscarium (Petch) Zare & W. Gams 2001: pathogens of whiteflies and thrips
- Lecanicillium nodulosum (Petch) Zare & W. Gams 2001
- Lecanicillium pissodis Kope & I. Leal 2006
- Lecanicillium psalliotae (Treschew) Zare & W. Gams 2001
- Lecanicillium saksenae (Kushwaha) Kurihara & Sukarno 2009
- Lecanicillium tenuipes (Petch) Zare & W. Gams 2001
- Lecanicillium wallacei (H.C. Evans) H.C. Evans & Zare 2008

At least 15 products based on Lecanicillium spp. have been, or are in the process of being commercialized as biological pesticides, against a variety of pests in numerous countries worldwide.
