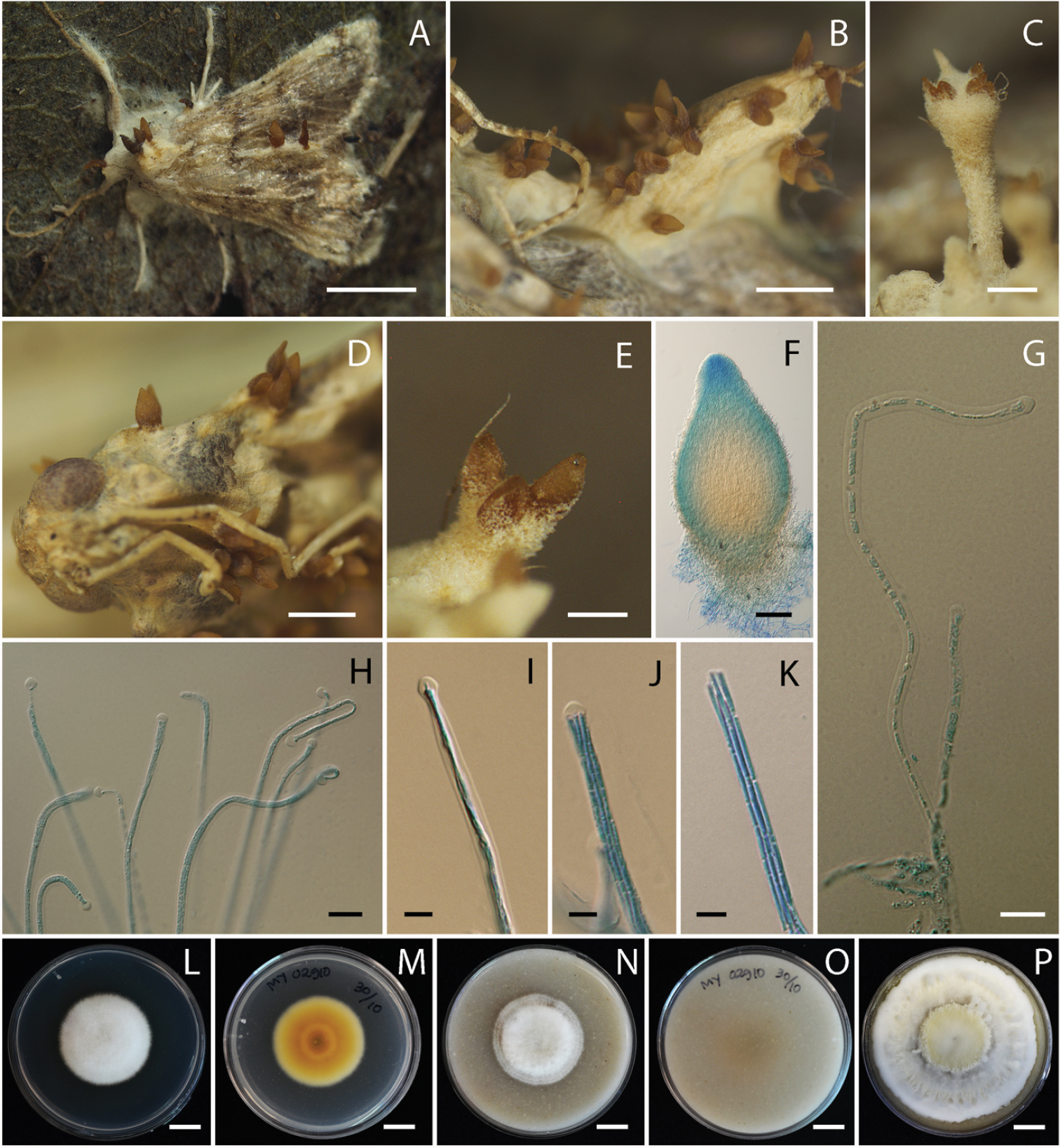
- A. pyralidarum

Scientific classification
- Domain: Eukaryota
- Kingdom: Fungi
- Division: Ascomycota
- Class: Sordariomycetes
- Order: Hypocreales
- Family: Cordycipitaceae
- Genus: Akanthomyces; Lebert, 1858

= Akanthomyces =

Genus of fungi

Akanthomyces is a genus of fungi belonging to the family Cordycipitaceae and consisting of parasites of spiders and Lepidoptera.

The genus was first described by Lebert in 1858.

The genus has cosmopolitan distribution.

Species:

- Akanthomyces aculeatus Lebert
- Akanthomyces araneicola
- Akanthomyces lepidopterorum
- Akanthomyces neocoleopterorum
- Akanthomyces noctuidarum Aini, Luangsa-ard, Mongkols. & Thanakitp.
- Akanthomyces pyralidarum Aini, Luangsa-ard, Mongkols. & Thanakitp.
- Akanthomyces tortricidarum Aini, Luangsa-ard, Mongkols. & Thanakitp.
