= Parengyodontium album =

Scientific classification
- Kingdom: Fungi
- Division: Ascomycota
- Class: Sordariomycetes
- Order: Hypocreales
- Family: Cordycipitaceae
- Genus: Parengyodontium
- Species: P. album

Binomial name
- Parengyodontium album (Limber) C.C. Tsang et al.

Fungal species

Parengyodontium album is a globally distributed fungal species known for breaking down plastics and items of historical importance. Early discoveries of the fungus were found in historical places across the globe, like monuments and museums, being attracted to mainly the materials of stone and paint, and showing its endurance over time in extreme locations. Discoveries in the early 21st century revealed its presence in marine ecosystems, colonizing and breaking down polyethylene, the most abundant plastic in oceans. Marine microbiologists from the Royal Netherlands Institute for Sea Research and collaborators from various international institutions found P. album, along with other marine microbes, living in thin biofilms on plastics scattered throughout the ocean. The fungus and bacteria are found in the Great Pacific Garbage Patch, which is located in the Pacific Ocean, and it is a hub where plastic in the ocean accumulates by the masses. Though many types of bacteria have been shown to break down plastics, Parengyodontium album is one of only four species of marine fungi known to have this capability as of 2024.

== Description ==
Parengyodontium album, also called Engyodontium album, typically grows in moist or waste environments and can be found on common materials like paper, jute, linen, and painted walls. It reproduces through dry, hydrophobic conditions, using a type of spore that allows the fungus to spread through the air and colonize new areas. The fungus forms white, fluffy colonies that can be observed as having clear, colorless undersides. Under a microscope, it displays narrow vegetative hyphae (the main growth structure of the fungus) along with fertile hyphae that branch out and bear conidiogenous cells (the specialized cells where spores are formed). The spores themselves are smooth, round, and transparent. This fungus, originally described as Tritirachium album Limber, 1940, has undergone several taxonomic changes, initially included in a new genus created for species with verticillately branched conidiophores similar to those of Verticillium but differing in their final zigzag conidia-bearing portion. It was first isolated from a Penicillium colony in a marine biological laboratory, where it was considered a possible contaminant. This fungus is not only common in natural settings but has also been noted for its ability to thrive in human-made environments, and can become pathogenic, particularly in individuals with weakened immune systems.

== History ==
As described above, Parengyodontium album has most recently been associated with the Pacific Ocean and the breaking down of plastics. Not only can they be found in the ocean, but they can notably be found in old monuments, museums, libraries, and religious buildings containing wall paints. This includes Leonardo da Vinci's Atlantic Codex dating back to the late Middle Ages. In the past, the organism could also be found in an array of regions across the planet such as Cuban Museums in Central America, stone caverns in North America, and even isolated across territories in Europe. In particular, it has been discovered in Europe in the barracks of the Auschwitz-Birkenau Camp built in 1942. It was also found in caves both from the bare rock of the cave or from wall paintings in the caves and tombs both on the materials themselves or within the air of these locations, often dating from Etruscan and Roman times. Other noteworthy substances where the fungus was isolated were glass windows, wood materials like historical wood staircases of these buildings, paper, plaster, and brick.

Parengyodontium album was seen as a variable that can affect and decline the structure of these materials. However, the amount at which they do so varies with each site. In some places, colonization and traces of the fungus were more prevalent and less prevalent in others. Yet, some factors did influence the growth of the fungus. For instance, salt and water or moisture invasion were often present in these sites. Seemingly, it had a liking to humid environments and had a high tolerance to salt. Not too much is known about the effects of temperature on the organism. However, it is generally viewed as an organism that grows well in moderate temperatures and, nonetheless, can still survive in extreme conditions and low temperatures. Yet again, showing its endurance and adaptability. Another example of this is its ability to feed on multiple organic nutrient sources ranging from the low nutrient stone it colonizes on, products in wall paintings, and dead bugs, which have more nutrients.

== Breakdown of ocean plastics ==
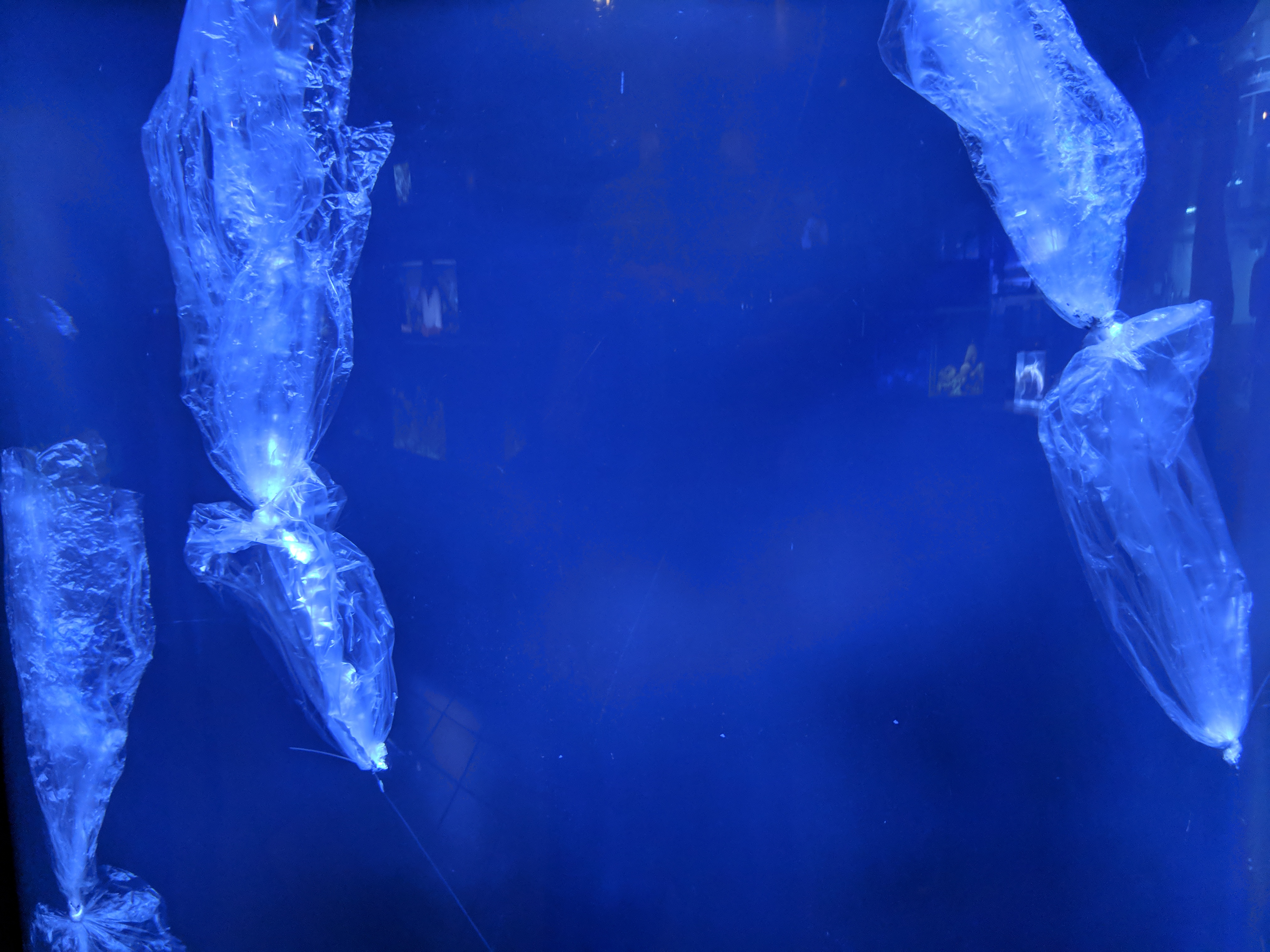
An exhibit at the Mote Marine Laboratory that displays plastic bags (most commonly made with polyethylene films) in the ocean that look similar to jellyfish

The degradation of polyethylene by Parengyodontium album is particularly notable because it occurs at a rate of about 0.05 percent per day under laboratory conditions, and this process is significantly influenced by sunlight. Researchers noted that the fungus only breaks down polyethylene that has been exposed to UV light, indicating that in natural settings, P. album likely affects plastics floating near the ocean surface. UV light is the leading agent in breaking down plastics, however, when UV light and the special fungus found in the Great Pacific Garbage Patch work together, more plastics can be broken down rather than if they worked separately. UV light is part of sunlight and as it shines on the ocean and the fungus present there it is evident that it is a necessary factor in the plastic’s decomposition. Although UV light has been closely related to radiation and has been notorious for being harmful to humans and our environment, it can also be used as a source of energy that comes from the sun. UV light is an important factor in the fungus decomposition because it causes a chemical reaction that ultimately reacts in a way that decomposes the plastic with the fungus’ support. The support of the UV light is unable to reach the deeper depths of the ocean, and the fungus is unable to pull assistance from the light in the plastic removal. Because of this, some plastic is unable to be removed with UV light alone. While the fungus converts most of the carbon from polyethylene into carbon dioxide, the environmental impact of this CO_{2} release is minimal, akin to the amount exhaled by humans during breathing. The fungus is an essential organism that works hand in hand with UV light in plastic decay. Its existence is possible because of its survival and inhabitance in the Great Pacific Garbage Patch, where trace amounts of the fungi have been found. The Great Pacific Garbage Patch is a hotspot for this organism due to its copious amounts of plastic and its great size. The Garbage Patch is not only one massive Garbage pile, but it is actually a combination of two separate masses. It has been calculated that the Patch is around 617,674 square miles in size, amounting to about three times the size of Texas. The Patch was discovered in 1997 by Charles Moore. Due to industrialization, plastics and microplastics from civilization have found their way into rivers and lakes. This and water flow has led to the creation of the Great Pacific Garbage. For decades, plastic has been accumulating in the Garbage Patch, allowing its size to continually expand, with plastics and microplastics affecting the Pacific Ocean's marine life and even washing up on shore. The fungus provides a source for the plastic’s decomposition that is an alternative to UV light alone.

== Experiments and the future ==
Based on the study done by the scientific journal Science of the Total Environment, it is significant that in a lab setting, the fungus’ decomposing process was able to be measured. For example, at the Royal Netherlands Institute for Sea Research, the breakdown of polyethylene plastics was found to be at a rate of “around 0.05 percent each day”, and while it does release carbon dioxide, a greenhouse gas, in this process, it causes no harm as it has a similar release rate as humans when they breathe. However, sunlight is also a vital source for the fungus to turn polyethylene plastic into a polyethylene root of energy. However, plastic that sinks to lower parts of the ocean where UV light is unable to reach and is out of impact in accordance with the fungi is another problem within itself. Moving forward, as copious amounts of plastic continue to be integrated into the ocean and get held captive there, this lab experiment studying Parengyodontium album can be used to create a “next-generation enzyme” that can also break down plastic but at a more reliable rate.
