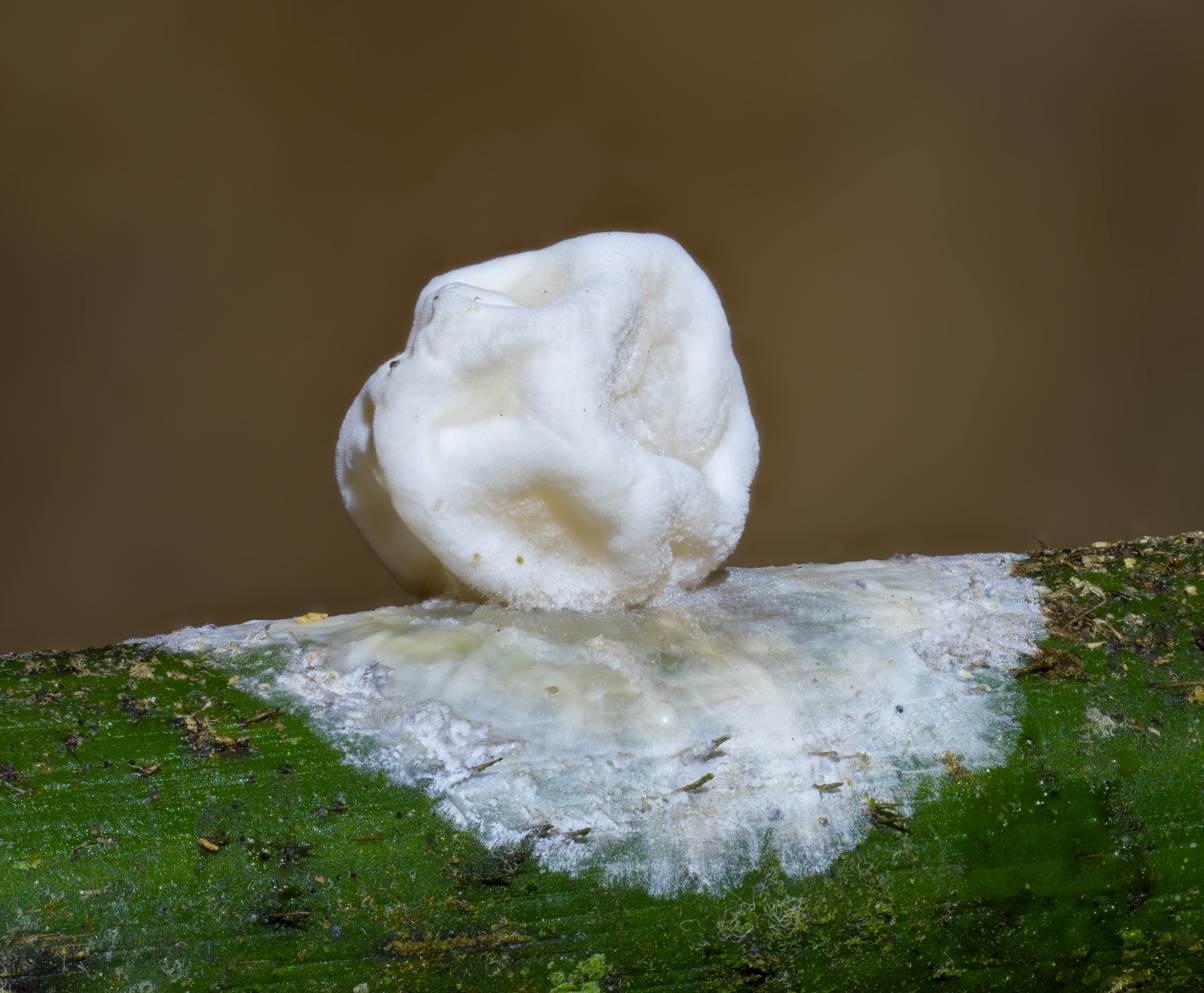
- Ascoporus polychrous

Scientific classification
- Kingdom: Fungi
- Division: Ascomycota
- Class: Sordariomycetes
- Order: Hypocreales
- Family: Cordycipitaceae
- Genus: Ascopolyporus; A.Möller (1901)

Type species
- Ascopolyporus polychrous A.Möller (1901)

Species
- A. gollmerianus A. moellerianus A. philodendri A. polychrous A. polyporoides A. puttemansii A. villosus

= Ascopolyporus =

Genus of fungi

Ascopolyporus is a genus of fungi within the family Cordycipitaceae. Species are pathogens of scale insects.

The type species of Ascopolyporus is A. polychrous.

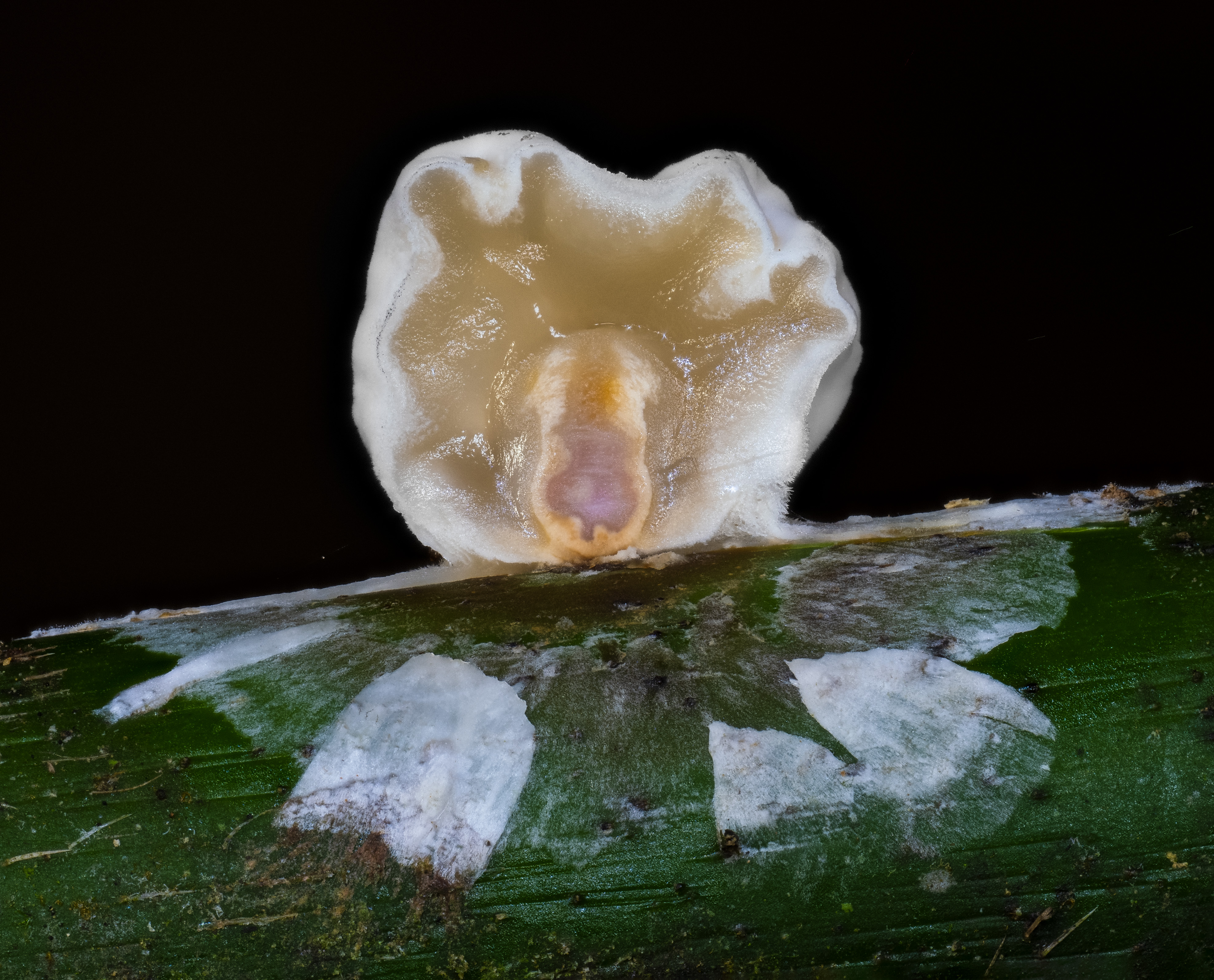
Ascopolyporus polychrous cross section
