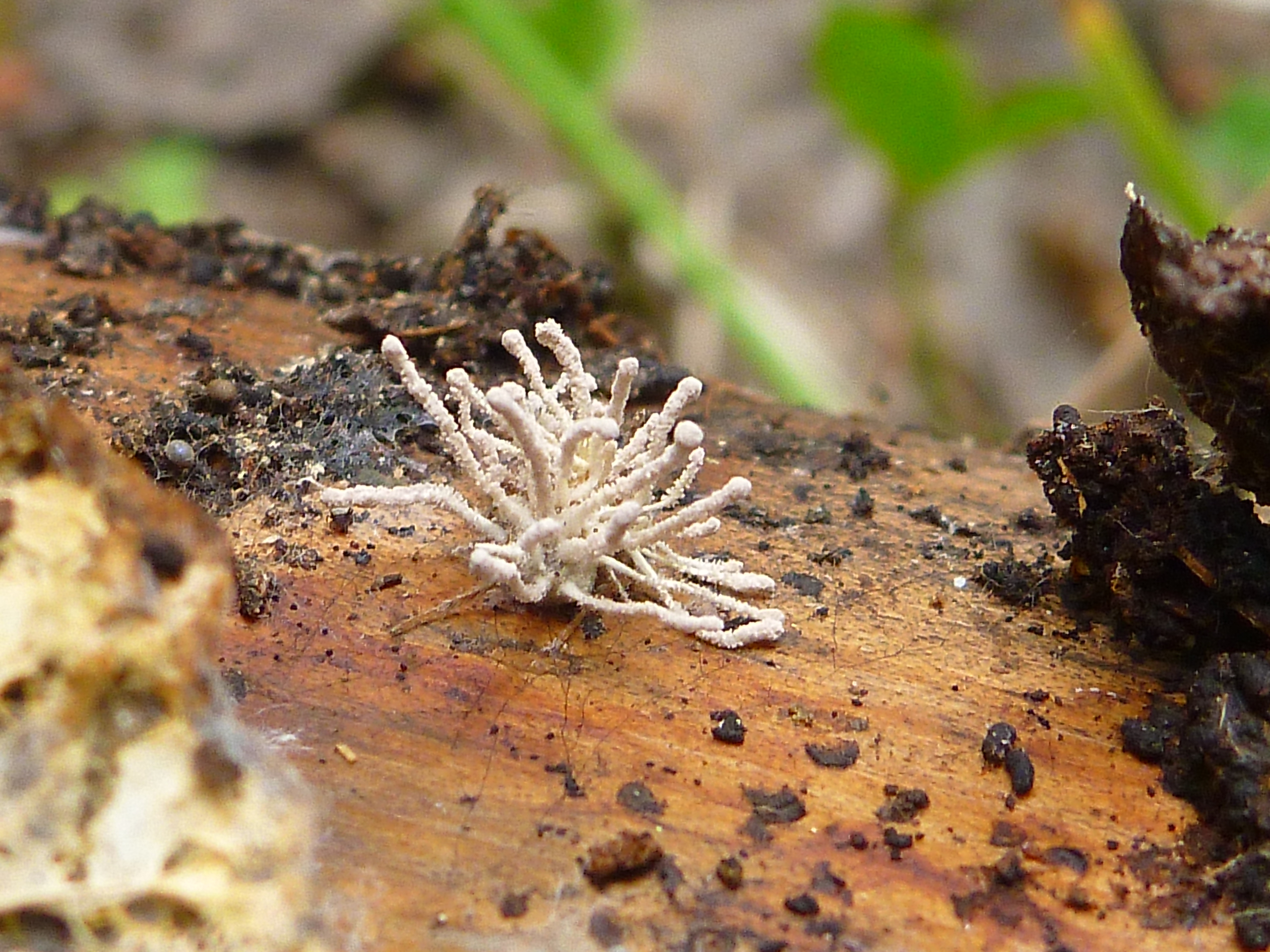
- Torrubiella arachnophila var. leiopus growing on a dead spider

Scientific classification
- Domain: Eukaryota
- Kingdom: Fungi
- Division: Ascomycota
- Class: Sordariomycetes
- Order: Hypocreales
- Family: Cordycipitaceae
- Genus: Torrubiella; Boud. (1885)

Type species
- Torrubiella aranicida Boud. (1885)

= Torrubiella =

Genus of fungi

Torrubiella is a genus of fungi in the family Cordycipitaceae. The genus was circumscribed by mycologist Jean Louis Émile Boudier in 1885.

The genus name of Torrubiella is in honour of José Torrubia (1698–1761), who was a Spanish naturalist (Geology and paleontology) and clergyman. He was in 1721 a missionary in the Philippines and then Mexico.

== Species ==
- Torrubiella alba
- Torrubiella alboglobosa
- Torrubiella albolanata
- Torrubiella albotomentosa
- Torrubiella arachnophila
- Torrubiella aranicida
- Torrubiella aurantia
- Torrubiella barda
- Torrubiella brunnea
- Torrubiella brunneola
- Torrubiella clavata
- Torrubiella colombiana
- Torrubiella cordyceps
- Torrubiella corniformis
- Torrubiella dabieshanensis
- Torrubiella dimorpha
- Torrubiella ellipsoidea
- Torrubiella falklandica
- Torrubiella farinacea
- Torrubiella flava
- Torrubiella flavoviridis
- Torrubiella formicarum
- Torrubiella formosana
- Torrubiella fusiformis
- Torrubiella gibellulae
- Torrubiella globosa
- Torrubiella globosoides
- Torrubiella globosostipitata
- Torrubiella gonylepticida
- Torrubiella hemipterigena
- Torrubiella inegoensis
- Torrubiella iriomoteana
- Torrubiella lecanii
- Torrubiella liberiana
- Torrubiella lloydii
- Torrubiella longissima
- Torrubiella mammillata
- Torrubiella minuta
- Torrubiella minutissima
- Torrubiella miyagiana
- Torrubiella neofusiformis
- Torrubiella oblonga
- Torrubiella ochracea
- Torrubiella ooaniensis
- Torrubiella pallida
- Torrubiella paxillata
- Torrubiella petchii
- Torrubiella piperis
- Torrubiella plana
- Torrubiella pseudogibellulae
- Torrubiella psyllae
- Torrubiella pulvinata
- Torrubiella ratticaudata
- Torrubiella rhynchoticola
- Torrubiella rokkiana
- Torrubiella rosea
- Torrubiella rostrata
- Torrubiella rubra
- Torrubiella ryogamimontana
- Torrubiella ryukyuensis
- Torrubiella sericicola
- Torrubiella siamensis
- Torrubiella sphaerospora
- Torrubiella sublintea
- Torrubiella superficialis
- Torrubiella tomentosa
- Torrubiella wallacei
