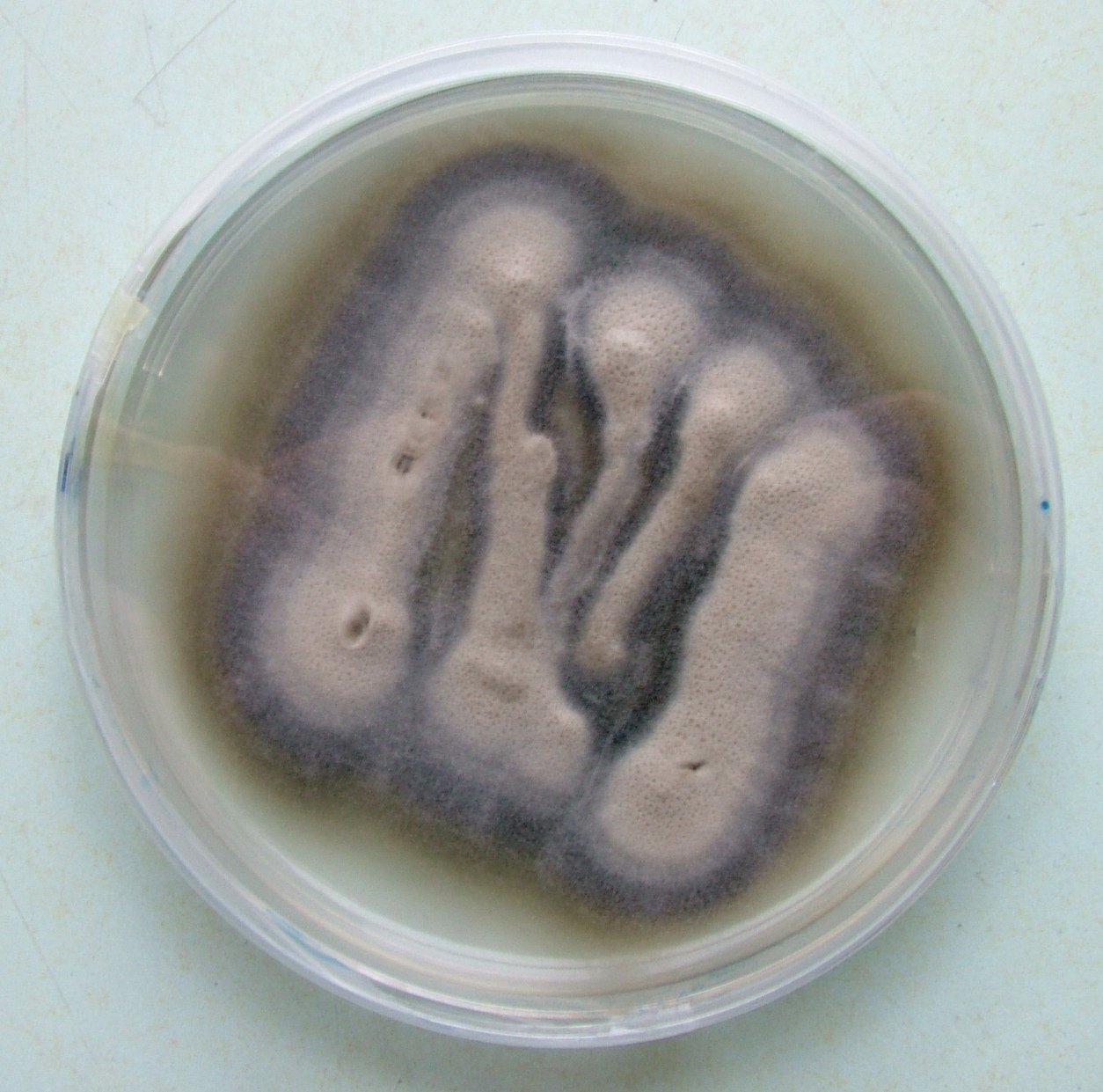
- Verticillium theobromae culture

Scientific classification
- Kingdom: Fungi
- Division: Ascomycota
- Class: Sordariomycetes
- Order: Glomerellales
- Family: Plectosphaerellaceae
- Genus: Verticillium; Nees (1816)

Type species
- Verticillium dahliae Kleb. (1913)

Species
- See text

= Verticillium =

Genus of fungi

Verticillium is a genus of fungi in the division Ascomycota, and are an anamorphic form of the family Plectosphaerellaceae. The genus used to include diverse groups comprising saprobes and parasites of higher plants, insects, nematodes, mollusc eggs, and other fungi, thus the genus used to have a wide-ranging group of taxa characterised by simple but ill-defined characters. The genus, currently thought to contain 51 species, may be broadly divided into three ecologically based groups - mycopathogens, entomopathogens, and plant pathogens and related saprotrophs. However, the genus has undergone recent revision into which most entomopathogenic and mycopathogenic isolates fall into a new (unrelated) group called Lecanicillium.

At least five species are known to cause a wilt disease in plants called verticillium wilt: V. dahliae, V. longisporum, V. albo-atrum, V. nubilum, and V. tricorpus. A sixth species, V. theobromae, causes fruit or crown rot, a non-wiliting disease.

== Verticillium wilt ==
Verticillium wilt is a disease that can affect over 400 different eudicot plants, many of which are economically important worldwide. Several characteristics of Verticillium make it difficult to manage: prolonged survival in soils without the presence of a host, inaccessibility during infection, a wide host range, and limited resistance in host germplasm. However, all monocots, gymnosperms and ferns are immune.

The fungus survives in the soil principally in the form of microsclerotia, invades the plant through the root system, colonizes the vasculature, and eventually leads to plant death. The main mechanisms of its pathogenesis are xylem vessel blockage and toxin production. When the fungus propagates within a host plant, the mycelium blocks the xylem vessels, impairing the transport of water and nutrients in the host. The forces of transpiration and respiration in leaves combined with blocked xylem transport cause water imbalances in leaves that result in leaf yellowing and wilting, contributing to plant death. In addition, Verticillium produces mycotoxins within the plant that can cause necrosis in leaves and impair metabolism in the plant body. In some systems, toxin production has been shown to be the main cause of plant wilting.

First identified from potatoes in Germany in 1870, this disease affects a variety of cultivated plants and can persist as a saprotrophic soil organism for more than 15 years. Identification can be made by looking for one-celled conidia, hyaline round to ellipsoid which are formed at the tips of whorled branches. They are easily separated from the tips. When infecting ornamental trees such as maples, elms, aspen, ash, beech, catalpa, oak, and others, the first symptoms are midsummer wilting on one side of a tree or branch. The sapwood has greenish or brownish streaks, and the infection can take a few years to progress to the rest of the tree or move rapidly. The fungi universally move up the xylem vessels. In fruit trees, the infection is known as black heart, and is common in apricots and sometimes affects almond, peach, plum, and avocado trees. This fungus affects herbaceous ornamentals such as chrysanthemums, mints, Lychnis spp. It infects many agriculturally important crops like vegetables such as tomatoes, eggplants, okra, broccoli, cauliflower and rhubarb; food related crops like rapeseed and hops; and fiber crops like cotton.

== Selected species ==
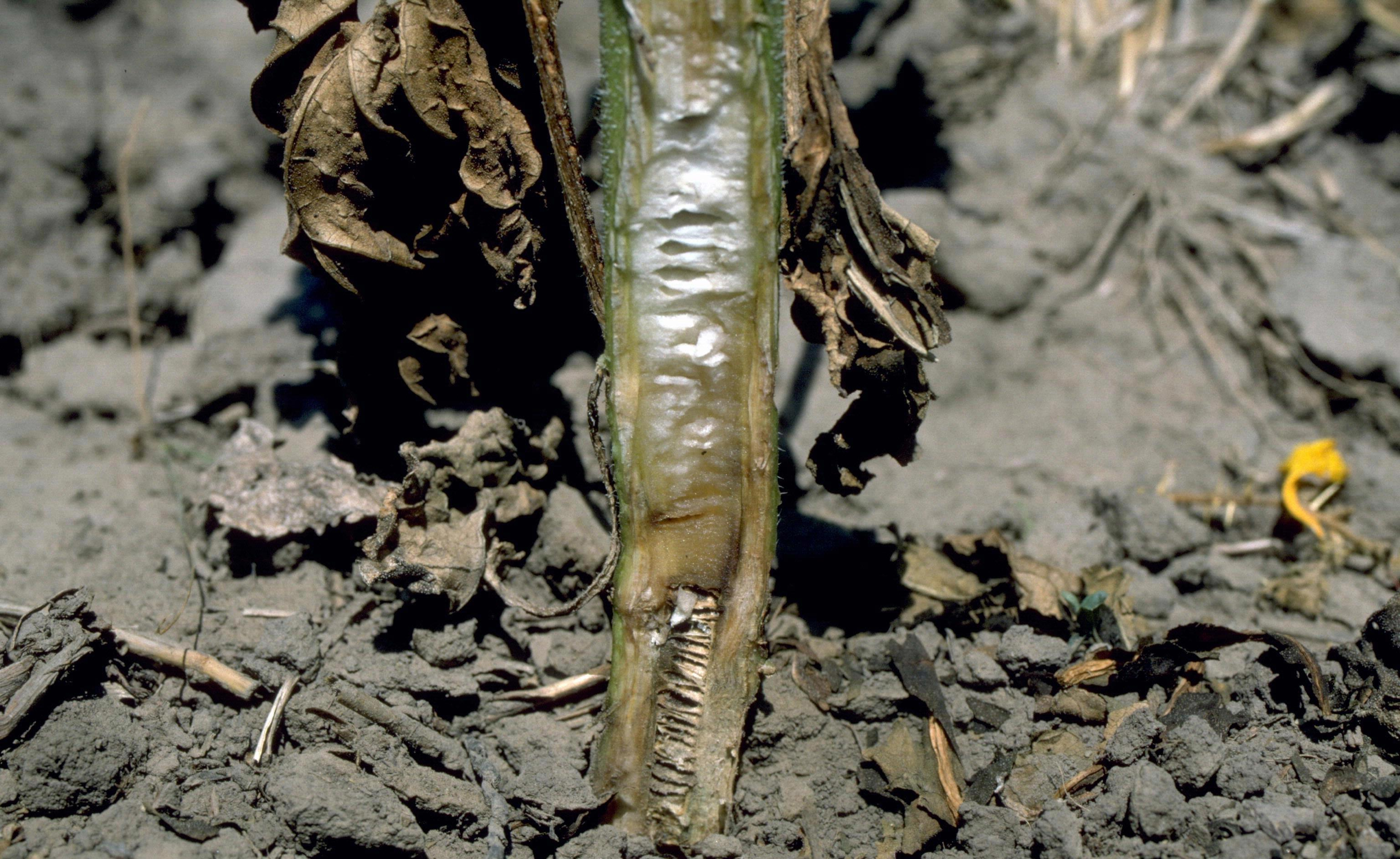
Verticillium dahliae infecting sunflower

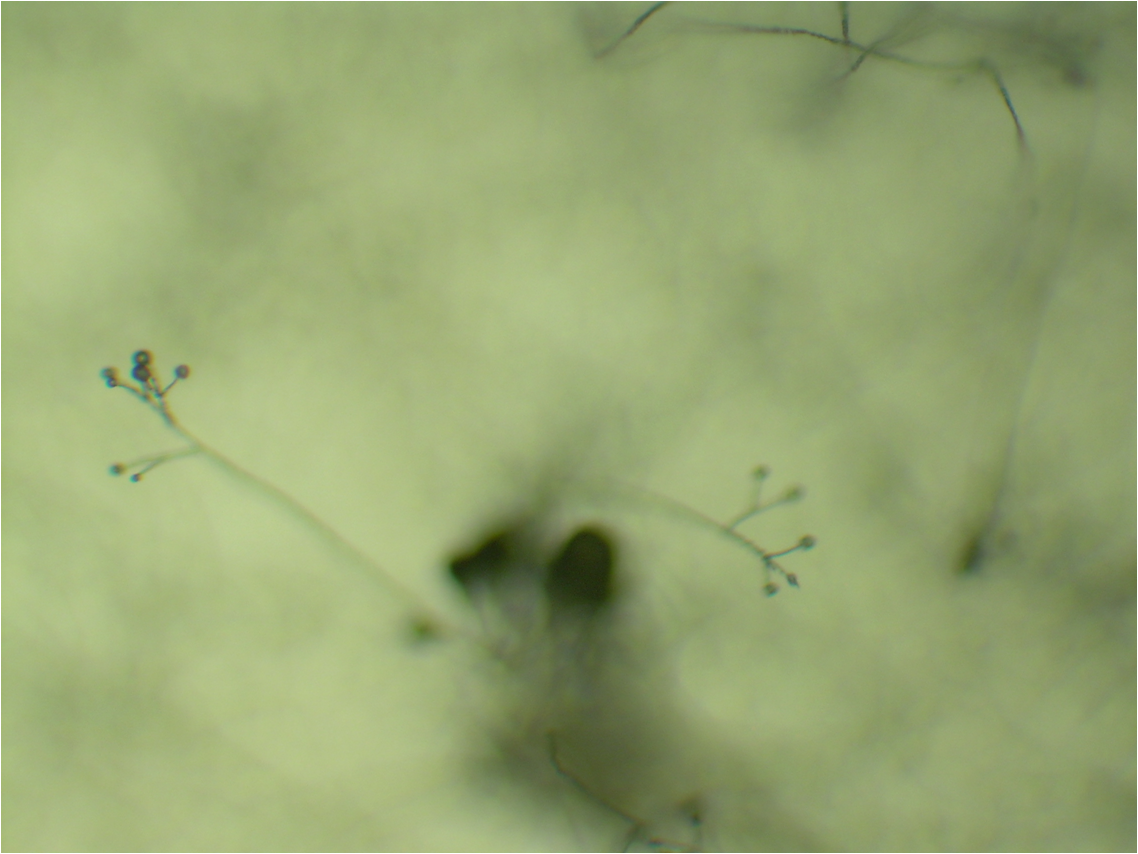
Verticillium conidiophores

- Verticillium dahliae Kleb.
- Verticillium albo-atrum
- Verticillium alfalfae
- Verticillium isaacii Can cause verticillium wilt but can also inhabit hosts without necessarily being pathogenic.
- Verticillium longisporum
- Verticillium nonalfalfae
- Verticillium theobromae
- Verticillium zaregamsianum
- Nematode pathogens which had previously been included in Verticillium have now been placed in the new genus Pochonia.
- insect pathogens which had previously been included in Verticillium have been placed in the new genus Lecanicillium. An approved name of Verticillium lecanii (Zimmerman) Viegas is now Lecanicillium lecanii although isolates may belong to: L. attenuatum, L. longisporum, L. muscarium, or L. nodulosum.
