= Primary isolate =

Primary isolate is a pure microbial or viral sample that has been obtained from an infected individual, rather than grown in a laboratory. In chemistry and bacteriology, the verb isolate means to obtain a pure chemical, bacteriological or viral sample. The noun 'isolate' refers to the sample itself.

According to the 'Bulletin of Experimental Treatments for AIDS, Year-End, 1999' glossary, a primary isolate is "HIV taken from an infected individual, as opposed to that grown in a laboratory."
