= Warwick HRI =

United Kingdom research organization

Warwick HRI (formerly Horticulture Research International) was a United Kingdom organisation tasked with carrying out horticultural research and development and transferring the results to industry in England.

== History ==
Horticulture Research International (HRI) was constituted in May 1990 from the Agricultural and Food Research Council Institute of Horticultural Research Stations at Wellesbourne (the National Vegetable Research Station), East Malling (the East Malling Research Station) and Littlehampton (the Glasshouse Crops Research Institute), the Hop Research Unit at Wye College and the ADAS Experimental Stations of the Ministry of Agriculture, Fisheries and Food at Efford, Kirton and Stockbridge.

Warwick HRI was formed on 1 April 2004 following the integration of HRI's sites at Wellesbourne and Kirton with the University of Warwick. The Kirton site was closed by the university in February 2009.

The Wellesbourne site covered an area of 191 hectares (470 acres) and contained protected crop facilities, glasshouses, a bioconversion unit, controlled environment units and laboratory facilities including the Genomic Resource Centre. The Kirton site spanned 50 hectares (120 acres), with seed handling equipment and a 4-hectare (10-acre) organic area.

Research at Warwick HRI included plant science, crop and environmental sciences, applied microbial sciences and applied horticulture. Postgraduate taught and research degrees were offered.

In November 2009, Warwick University announced that it had decided to close Warwick HRI as the centre was losing the university £2 million a year. Warwick HRI was merged with the University's Department of Biological Sciences into a new School of Life Sciences in October 2010. Some research work on vegetable genetic improvement continued at the Crop Centre.
