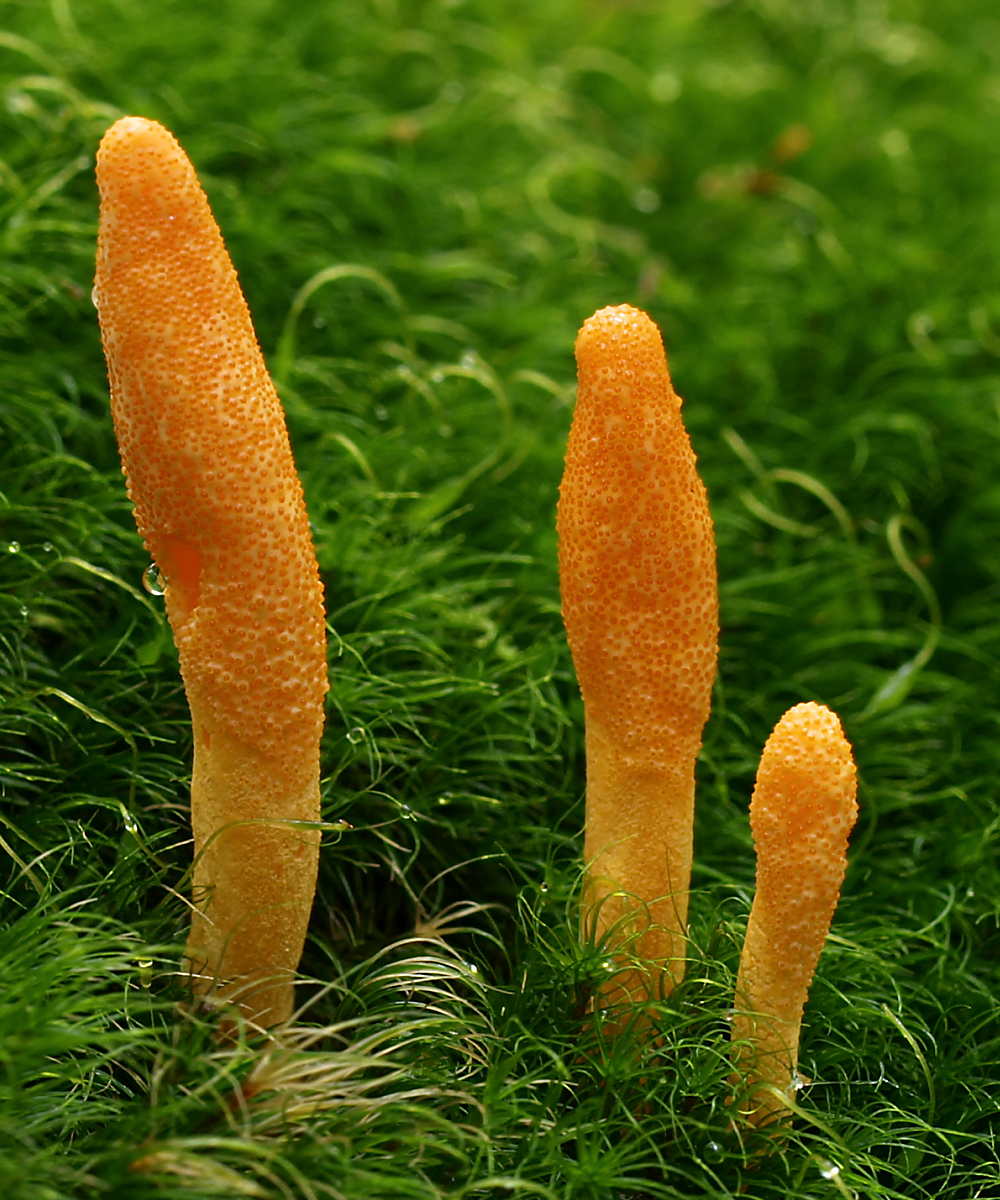
- Cordyceps militaris

Scientific classification
- Kingdom: Fungi
- Division: Ascomycota
- Class: Sordariomycetes
- Order: Hypocreales
- Family: Cordycipitaceae; Kreisel ex G.H.Sung, J.M.Sung, Hywel-Jones & Spatafora (2007)

Type genus
- Cordyceps Fr. (1818)

= Cordycipitaceae =

Family of fungi

The Cordycipitaceae are a family of parasitic fungi in the Ascomycota, class Sordariomycetes and order Hypocreales. The family was first published in 1969 by mycologist Hanns Kreisel, but the naming was invalid according to the code of International Code of Nomenclature for algae, fungi, and plants. It was validly published in 2007 as a way to resolve the paraphyly of Clavicipitaceae.

== Description ==
Cordycipitaceae species have stromata or subicula that are pallid or brightly pigmented and fleshy. Their perithecia are superficial to completely immersed in the substrate, and oriented at right angles to the surface of the stroma. The asci are cylindrical with a thickened ascus tip. Ascospores are usually cylindrical, contain multiple septa, and disarticulate into part-spores or remain intact at maturity.

== Genera ==
Updated in 2020 (with numbers of species)

- Akanthomyces Lebert (21) – anamorphs subsumed here:
  - Lecanicillium (Zimm.) Zare & W.Gams (2001)
  - Torrubiella Boud.
- Amphichorda Fr. (1)
- Ascopolyporus Möller (7)
- Beauveria Vuill. (54) – anamorph
- Beejasamuha Subram. & Chandrash. (1)
- Blackwellomyces Spatafora & Luangsa-ard (2)
- Cordyceps (Fr.) Link (498) – anamorphs:
  - Isaria Pers. = Microhilum H.Y. Yip & A.C. Rath
- Coremiopsis Sizova & Suprun (2)
- Engyodontium de Hoog (5) – anamorph
- Evlachovaea
- Flavocillium H. Yu, Y.B. Wang, Y. Wang, Q. Fan & Zhu L. Yang (4)
- Gamszarea Z.F. Zhang & L. Cai (8)
- Gibellula Cavara (29)
- Hevansia Luangsa-ard, Hywel-Jones & Spatafora (8)
- Hyperdermium J.F. White, R.F. Sullivan, Bills & Hywel-Jones (3)
- Jenniferia
- Leptobacillium Zare & W. Gams (1)
- Liangia H. Yu, Y.B. Wang, Y. Wang, Z.H. Chen & Zhu L. Yang (1)
- Neobaryopsis
- Neohyperdermium
- Neotorrubiella Tasan., Thanakitp. & Luangsa-ard
- Parahevansia
- Parengyodontium C.C. Tsang, et al (1)
  - Parengyodontium album
- Pleurodesmospora
- Pseudogibellula Samson & H.C. Evans (1)
- Samsoniella Mongkols., Noisrip., Thanakitp., Spatafora & Luangsa-ard (3)
- Simplicillium W. Gams & Zare (12) – anamorph

== Parengyodontium album ==
Parengyodontium album can break down polyethylene (PE), one of the most commonly used plastics. P. album is the fourth fungus that can do so. Laboratory experiments suggest that PE marine waste exposed to ultraviolet light could be broken down and used as an energy source by the fungus at a rate of 0.044% per day.

== See also ==
- Ophiocordycipitaceae
