= Metarhizium robertsii =

Scientific classification
- Kingdom: Fungi
- Division: Ascomycota
- Class: Sordariomycetes
- Order: Hypocreales
- Family: Clavicipitaceae
- Genus: Metarhizium
- Species: M. robertsii

Binomial name
- Metarhizium robertsii (Metchnikoff) Sorokin (1883)

Species of fungus

Metarhizium robertsii is a fungus that grows naturally in soils throughout the world and causes disease in various insects by acting as a parasitoid. It is a mitosporic fungus with asexual reproduction, which was formerly classified in the form class Hyphomycetes of the phylum Deuteromycota (also often called fungi imperfecti).

Many isolates have long been recognised to be specific, and they were assigned variety status, but they have now been assigned as new Metarhizium species in light of new molecular evidence; one of these was M. robertsii. Other examples were M. majus and M. acridum (which was M. anisopliae var. acridum and included the isolates used for locust control). Metarhizium taii was placed in M. anisopliae var. anisopliae, but has now been described as a synonym of M. guizhouense (see Metarhizium). The commercially important isolate M.a. 43 (or F52, Met52, etc.), which infects Coleoptera and other insect orders has now been assigned to Metarhizium brunneum.

== Important isolates ==
This species was named after Prof. Donald W. Roberts, whose PhD dissertation focused on destruxins of the insect-pathogenic fungus then called "Metarhizium anisopliae"; Don continued to work with entomopathogenic fungi, as a research professor, working especially with an isolate called ARSEF 23: which eventually became the type for this species.

== Biology ==
Insect diseases caused by fungi in this genus is sometimes called green muscardine disease because of the green colour of their spores. When these mitotic (asexual) spores (called conidia) of the fungus come into contact with the body of an insect host, they germinate and the hyphae that emerge penetrate the cuticle. The fungus then develops inside the body, eventually killing the insect after a few days; this lethal effect is very likely aided by the production of insecticidal cyclic peptides (destruxins). The cuticle of the cadaver often becomes red. If the ambient humidity is high enough, a white mould then grows on the cadaver that soon turns green as spores are produced. The fungus will sometimes transfer nitrogen acquired by killing the insect into the roots of nearby plants, obtaining carbon in return. Most insects living near the soil have evolved natural defenses against entomopathogenic fungi like M. robertsii. This fungus is, therefore, locked in an evolutionary battle to overcome these defenses, which has led to a large number of isolates (or strains) that are adapted to certain groups of insects.

== Economic importance ==
A simplified method of microencapsulation has been demonstrated to increase the shelf-life of M. robertsii spores commercialised for biological control of pest insects, potentially increasing its efficiency against red imported fire ants.

Metarhizium robertsii has been shown to break down very toxic mercury into less toxic forms of mercury. The fungus has been genetically engineered to improve its ability to perform this task.

== See also ==
- Beauveria bassiana, the fungus that causes white muscardine disease in various insects
