= Tariq Butt =

English entomologist

- Education: University of Bristol (BSc, PhD)
- Scientific career
- Workplaces: University of Swansea

Tariq Butt is a British entomologist. He is a Professor of Biosciences at Swansea University in Wales.

== Career and research ==
Butt was educated at the University of Bristol where he graduated with a BSc in Botany and Zoology in 1980 and a PhD in the Fungal pathogens of aphids in 1983.

He leads the Biocontrol and Natural Products (BANP) team at Swansea University, he develops new control methods for insect crop pests, particularly with the use entomopathogenic fungi and biopesticides.

Butt identified that the fungus Metarhizium anisopliae can target western flower thrips and vine weevil, both pests of fruit and flower crops. Butt's team have also tested Metarhizium anisopliae and found the V275 strain of the fungus can control insects that are vectors of animal disease, such as biting midges that transmit the Schmallenberg Disease virus.

He has worked with a related fungus species, Metarhizium brunneum, that can attack and kill larvae of Aedes mosquitoes which can transmit the Dengue, Chikungunya and Zika viruses; he found that blastospore of the fungus could penetrate the mosquito larva cuticle and kill the developing insect.

Butt has tested effects of the fungus Beauveria bassiana on waxmoth, a pest of honeybee hives, and found that the moths could become resistant to the pathogenic fungus, but at a cost as the resistant adults did not breed as well as the non resistant.

His group have also used entomopathogenic nematodes together with entomopathogenic fungi to target the large pine weevil which is a major pest of forestry feeding on the bark and stem of young trees, the combination increased the mortality of the weevil and reduced overall control costs.

In 2001, Butt edited a book Fungi as Biocontrol Agents: Progress, Problems and Potential, with Chris Jackson and Naresh Magan, published by CABI Publishing.

== Outreach ==
Appeared in the BBC Two television programme Ecomaths in 2012 with Stefan Gates, talking about how maths is used in his research when testing the mortality of insects in response to different biopesticides.
