= LUBILOSA =

Locust pesticide research program

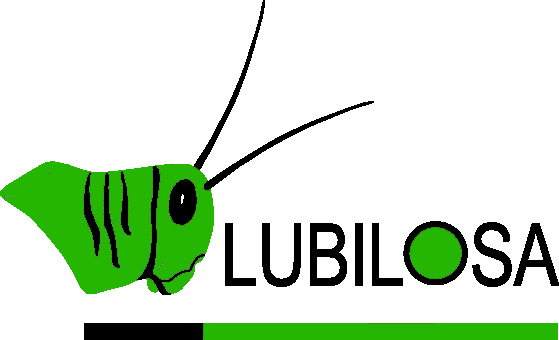

LUBILOSA was the name of a research programme that aimed at developing a biological alternative to the chemical control of locusts. This name is an acronym of the French title of the programme: Lutte Biologique contre les Locustes et les Sauteriaux (biological control of locusts and grasshoppers). During its 13-year life (November 1989 to December 2002), the programme identified an isolate of an entomopathogenic fungus belonging to the genus Metarhizium and virulent to locusts, and went through all the necessary steps to develop the commercial biopesticide product Green Muscle based on its spores.

== Collaborators ==
The programme was conceived by Chris Prior and David Greathead of the International Institute of Biological Control (IIBC), a former research institute of CAB International that was based at Silwood Park in the UK at that time. IIBC requested and obtained the collaboration of the former Biological Control Centre for Africa in Cotonou, Benin, that was owned and managed by the International Institute of Tropical Agriculture (IITA). When IIBC asked for financial support from the Dutch Directoraat Generaal voor Internationale Samenwerking (DGIS: Directorate General of International Cooperation), DGIS contributed by paying for a Dutch locust expert based at the Département de Formation en Protection des Végétaux (DFPV: Department of Crop Protection Training) of the AGRHYMET Regional Centre (ARC) in Niamey, Niger, which is part of the Comité permanent Inter-états de Lutte contre la Sécheresse dans le Sahel (CILSS: Permanent Interstate Committee for Drought Control in the Sahel). Since DFPV was given its own budget within LUBILOSA, it became a full partner within the programme. For a number of years, LUBILOSA collaborated with GTZ's locust programme. Permanent collaboration was established with the crop protection agencies of Niger, Benin, Burkina Faso, Chad, Mali, Senegal and The Gambia.

== Donors ==
The LUBILOSA programme was supported financially by the following donors:

- CIDA: Canadian International Development Agency
- DFID: Department for International Development, UK
- DGIS: Dutch Directorate General of International Cooperation
- SDC: Swiss Agency for Development and Cooperation
- USAID: United States Agency for International Development

Over the life of the programme, these donors contributed UK£10,200,000 (approximately US$17,000,000 at the time).

== Four phases ==
The LUBILOSA programme has been funded in phases of three or four years each:

- First phase 1990–1992
- Second phase 1993–1995
- Third phase 1996–1998
- Fourth phase 1999–2002

=== First phase ===
The project was started late in 1989, with Chris Prior and David Greathead obtaining funding and forming a team to develop a biological means of controlling locusts and grasshoppers. While examining the various options for biological control, it soon became apparent that oil formulations of the spores of certain fungi belonging to the form phylum Deuteromycota (Anamorphic fungi) offered the most promising option. Such fungi will grow on artificial substrates and so can be mass-produced relatively quickly in large quantities. Their spores are lipophilic and therefore suspend much more readily in oils than in water. As most locust control is carried out using oil formulations at ultra-low volume (ULV) rates of application, developing an oil formulation of fungal spores enabled operators to use the same equipment for applying a chemical pesticide and maximise efficacy.

Usually, fungi are most active under moist conditions and in early attempts to use them as control agents, they were therefore applied in water formulations. However, the results in practice were often disappointing and the approach was largely abandoned during most of the 20th century. When interest in microbial control was revived, water formulations of fungi started to be used successfully in greenhouses, but the results in open fields continued to disappoint. In the 1980s, Prior discovered that some anamorphic fungi are more effective when applied in oil.

During the first phase of LUBILOSA, the technical feasibility of using such oil formulations against locusts was demonstrated in the laboratory, then field cage and "arena" trials. An extensive survey was launched in West Africa and the Arabian Peninsula to look for isolates virulent to locusts and grasshoppers, because few such isolates were available in public collections. The survey made use of a network of collaborators and came up with some 180 isolates, many of which belonged to Metarhizium acridum, some to other Metarhizium species and to Beauveria bassiana with a few records of Syngliocladium acridiorum (syn. Sorosporella). Laboratory screening of these isolates showed that M. acridum was easily the most virulent species under warm conditions (30 °C), and confirmed the selection of isolate IMI 330189 for further development. Subsequent trials in cages and arenas confirmed that oil formulations were infective even under very dry conditions. IMI 330189 and similar isolates were assigned to Metarhizium flavoviride in early papers, then Metarhizium anisopliae var. acridum, but are now described as Metarhizium acridum (Driver & Milner) J.F. Bisch., Rehner & Humber.

=== Second phase ===
During phase 2, the oil formulation was tested in the field and shown to be effective. Field trials proved to be difficult to carry out on such highly mobile insects as grasshoppers and locusts. With locusts, fixed plots, unless several square kilometres in size, cannot be used, so it is necessary to follow hopper bands. Although there were many locust infestations during this phase, of both desert locusts (Schistocerca gregaria) and brown locusts (Locustana pardalina), the chemical treatment teams were also very active and little headway was therefore made in developing the techniques necessary to measure the effect of Metarhizium on unrestrained locusts. However, it was possible to scale up treatments against the variegated grasshopper (Zonocerus variegatus) in the forest zone and against Sahelian grasshoppers, especially the Senegalese grasshopper (Oedaleus senegalensis).

Contacts were made with several internationally renowned biopesticide producers to ascertain whether they would be able and willing to reliably meet LUBILOSA's spore requirements during phase 3, but none were able to make that commitment. Accordingly, part of the IITA station in Cotonou was converted into a spore production unit and the human and technical capacity enhanced to meet the expected spore requirements. The facility proved an excellent research unit and made it possible to refine realistic technical specifications and to test production, contamination control, spore separation, drying and packaging.

=== Third phase ===
==== Field trials ====
The LUBILOSA team continued to look for opportunities to test Metarhizium against locusts and grasshoppers. Field trials were conducted against Senegalese grasshoppers, African rice grasshoppers (Hieroglyphus daganensis), variegated grasshoppers, Sahelian tree locusts (Anacridium melanorhodon), brown locusts and desert locusts. These trials demonstrated that Metarhizium at a dosage of 50 g/ha could reduce grasshopper populations and those of tree locusts by 80-90% within two to three weeks. Population level control was more difficult to achieve with other locusts, but a significant effect was demonstrated on hopper bands notwithstanding the great difficulties in tracking individual bands. Some trials against Senegalese grasshoppers included the chemical insecticide fenitrothion for comparison. Because of its rather short persistence, this chemical turned out to be much less effective than commonly believed. It was highly effective in producing an immediate sharp reduction in population densities, but continued hatching and remigration into the treated plots caused these densities to start increasing again after less than a week, until they reached or exceeded the original levels after about two to three weeks. Metarhizium, on the other hand, reduced population levels at a slower rate, but maintained low levels for at least one and a half months. The half-life of its spores on the vegetation was estimated at more than 7 days under rainy season conditions in the Sahel and, of course, some conidia must survive between seasons.

==== Grasshopper behaviour ====
In the course of these field trials, it became clear that locusts and grasshoppers are able to detect that they have become infected and alter their behaviour accordingly. In particular, they spend more time basking in the sun, even in the middle of the day. Uninfected grasshoppers also bask in the sun when their body temperature is below the preferred 38-40 °C. However, detailed investigations showed that infected grasshoppers increase their body temperature to up to 4° higher. This effect has been dubbed “behavioural fever” and is thought to slow down the infection just like a fever in warm-blooded animals does. This basking behaviour poses a potential problem for the fungus. The latter's preferred temperature is 28-30 °C and it stops growing above 35°. Measurements of body temperatures in the field have shown that the basking behaviour reduces the time available for growth by many hours per day. Under certain conditions, this enables the insects to lay at least one egg pod before dying. Healthy locusts and grasshoppers, especially females, take some time after fledging to reach maturity and lay eggs, during which time they build up sufficient fat to produce up to three egg pods. However, infected ones usually dispense with this fattening period and go on to produce eggs immediately after fledging. This generally wears them out so much that they die after laying one pod. So even if Metarhizium does not kill before or shortly after fledging, it usually allows the formation of only a single egg pod and thereby reduces the fecundity of infected females.

==== (Eco)toxicology ====
During phase 3, the programme started investigating the environmental impact of the chosen Metarhizium isolate (IMI 330189). Standard toxicological tests carried out by certified laboratories showed that the strain had practically no effect on mammals, birds and fish (e.g. LD_{50} for rats >2000 mg active ingredient per kg of body weight). Other toxicological and ecotoxicological tests were performed by the LUBILOSA team. An important goal was to show that its isolate only infected locusts and grasshoppers. Infection tests were therefore performed on a large number of invertebrates. The great majority could not be infected even by high doses. However, some species, like termites, honey bees, certain parasitoid wasps and silk worms, did get infected under laboratory conditions. Further experiments were carried out under semi-field and full field conditions, which showed that only silk worms suffered significant infection under those conditions. The conclusion from all these tests was that the LUBILOSA strain of Metarhizium was incapable of infecting vertebrates and infected only a small number of insect species under artificial conditions. The available studies indicate that under natural conditions, the isolate only infects species belonging to the Acrididea and the domesticated silk worm Bombyx mori.

==== Mass production ====
The spore production unit in Cotonou made it possible to optimise the mass production of spores of the LUBILOSA strain at an appropriate level of technology. The production process chosen was one consisting of liquid fermentation followed by a solid substrate phase. During the liquid phase, the fungus biomass is bulked up in a solution of sugar and yeast and may produce submerged conidia. Subsequently, the resulting broth is used to inoculate partially boiled and sterilised rice. The fungal mycelium invades the rice and then starts to sporulate. At this point, rice and fungus are slowly dried before separating the spores from the rice. A novel machine was invented to achieve this in an efficient way, which was subsequently further developed into the 'MycoHarvester'. The study and optimisation of the mass production process led to the adoption of quality standards for the produced spores, which could be imposed on those who wanted to produce the spores commercially under licence. Various aspects of quality control are important, including: levels of contamination (especially the absence of human pathogens), virulence to target pests, particle size spectrum and, not least, viable spore count. Extensive research was carried out on optimising storage of spores, which should be dry (<5% moisture content) and ideally be maintained under cool conditions.

==== Commercialisation ====
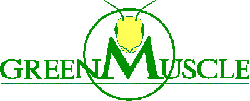

Two commercial companies agreed to look into the feasibility and economic viability of producing Metarhizium for the locust control market. These were Biological Control Products (BCP) near Durban, South Africa, and Natural Plant Protection (NPP) of Noguères, France (part of Calliope S.A.). The former registered the product under the name Green Muscle (deposited by CAB International), first in South Africa and subsequently in other southern and eastern African countries. BCP was the leading producer of biopesticides in Africa. Its main market was South Africa but its products were increasingly sold in other countries. The company continued its production and promotion of Green Muscle after the end of the LUBILOSA programme. It was taken over by Becker Underwood in 2010. NPP, however, only obtained a temporary sales permit for the CILSS countries in West Africa, but was unable to produce Green Muscle using its own production process.

=== Fourth phase ===
The last phase of LUBILOSA was characterised by promotion activities and stewardship of the commercial producer. Launching the product on the market and informing potential clients was not sufficient. The market for locust control products was (and still is) peculiar and difficult to penetrate. Most users are government or intergovernmental agencies involved in locust and/or grasshopper control. Especially in the beginning, it proved difficult to convince the professionals in these agencies of the need for an alternative product and to convince them that the product was as effective as those they had been using so far. Moreover, the large pesticide companies offered all kinds of incentives to those in charge of procurement in order that they buy their products, a practice that was difficult to follow for a small company like BCP. Until the end of the programme and even beyond, there was a constant need to do more field trials or demonstrations. Towards the end, the Locust Group of the Food and Agriculture Organization of the United Nations (FAO) finally became interested and involved in some of the trials: especially against desert locusts.

Apart from the Sahelian zone, grasshoppers are generally not considered serious pests in Africa and are therefore rarely controlled with pesticides. For that reason, it was only in the Sahel that serious efforts were undertaken to promote Green Muscle for grasshopper control. In a number of countries, and especially Niger, cereal growers are organised in village brigades that are charged with controlling pests that surpass the capacity of individual growers. Green Muscle was given to some of these after training in its correct application. After initial disappointment with its slow action, villagers usually became satisfied with the final results. However, the price proved to be a serious obstacle. Around 2000, the cost of producing one kg of Green Muscle was about $200. A dosage of 50 g/ha translated into a price of $10 per hectare. The price of conventional products was then approximately $5/ha. Though growers were prepared to pay a premium of up to $2 for the fact that Green Muscle was harmless to their health and that of their livestock, they were not going to pay $10. The issues surrounding production have long been discussed in the context of the West African market, but the availability of product has yet to be guaranteed.

At the end of the programme in December 2002, the LUBILOSA collaborators faced a situation where commercial uptake of Green Muscle was still non-existent, all quantities purchased so far exclusively for trial purposes. BCP was left alone to promote the product with little support from CABI and IITA, who had run out of funds for serious activities. The FAO had become interested and made it possible to carry out a few more field trials.

=== Post-LUBILOSA ===
After the termination of the LUBILOSA programme, activities to promote the use of Green Muscle continued, including field trials against red locusts and desert locusts with support from the FAO. A new project in West Africa, PRéLISS (Regional Project for Integrated Grasshopper Control in the Sahel), aimed at developing an integrated pest management (IPM) strategy that included the use of Green Muscle. This project conducted field trials with reduced dosages of Green Muscle and proved that 25 g/ha was as effective as the registered dosage of 50 g/ha. It also tested mixtures with lambda-cyhalothrin (a pyrethroid insecticide) to try to solve the problem of the slow action of Green Muscle. It was demonstrated that application of both products together, each at a quarter of its registered dose, caused mortality almost as quick as lambda-cyhalothrin alone and maintained low population levels for weeks, and all this at a much lower cost.

After it had become clear that NPP could not produce Green Muscle, the search for a second producer continued. A number of candidate producers were approached, but none was ready to take up the challenge. This situation only changed when desert locusts started invading West African countries again in late 2003. The president of Senegal, Abdoulaye Wade, and his wife Viviane Wade were very concerned about the prospect of huge quantities of chemical insecticides being sprayed to contain the upsurge. The first lady instructed her technical advisor, Sébastien Couasnet, to find out whether an alternative existed. The information about Green Muscle had remained stuck at the professional level of the crop protection agency of Senegal (and most likely other countries as well), notwithstanding all the efforts of LUBILOSA and PRéLISS to make the new product widely known.

Couasnet found the LUBILOSA website, which was still hosted by IITA and maintained by the then project leader of PRéLISS, Christiaan Kooyman. The two met in Cotonou and immediately set about to design a production plant for Green Muscle. Couasnet was able to convince the first lady to organise the financing and construction of the plant started in 2005. It took a while to start up the production and get rid of all sources of contamination, but this was eventually achieved with the backstopping of IITA, CAB International and Roy Bateman of IPARC, who installed a large-scale version of the 'MycoHarvester'. The production licence was granted in late 2007. For the following four years, production and marketing were taken care of by the Fondation Agir pour l'Education et la Santé, of which Viviane Wade was president. Unfortunately, FAES did not survive because of internal disagreements, especially concerning the extent to which private capital should be brought in to perpetuate the production of Green Muscle and similar products. After the defeat of President Wade in the presidential elections of 2012, FAES was closed down. Production of fungi had already stopped 8 months earlier. The only remaining producer of Green Muscle was then Becker Underwood South Africa, which was acquired by BASF SE in 2012. After that, the product seemed to have disappeared from the market and its registrations lapsed. Therefore, a new company, Eléphant Vert. registered in Switzerland with subsidiaries in France, Morocco, Mali, Senegal, Ivory Coast and Kenya, decided to develop a new product, NOVACRID, based on a different strain of M. acridum. In 2019, Éléphant Vert won the licence to produce and sell Green Muscle and are now the sole producers for Green Muscle in Africa and beyond.
