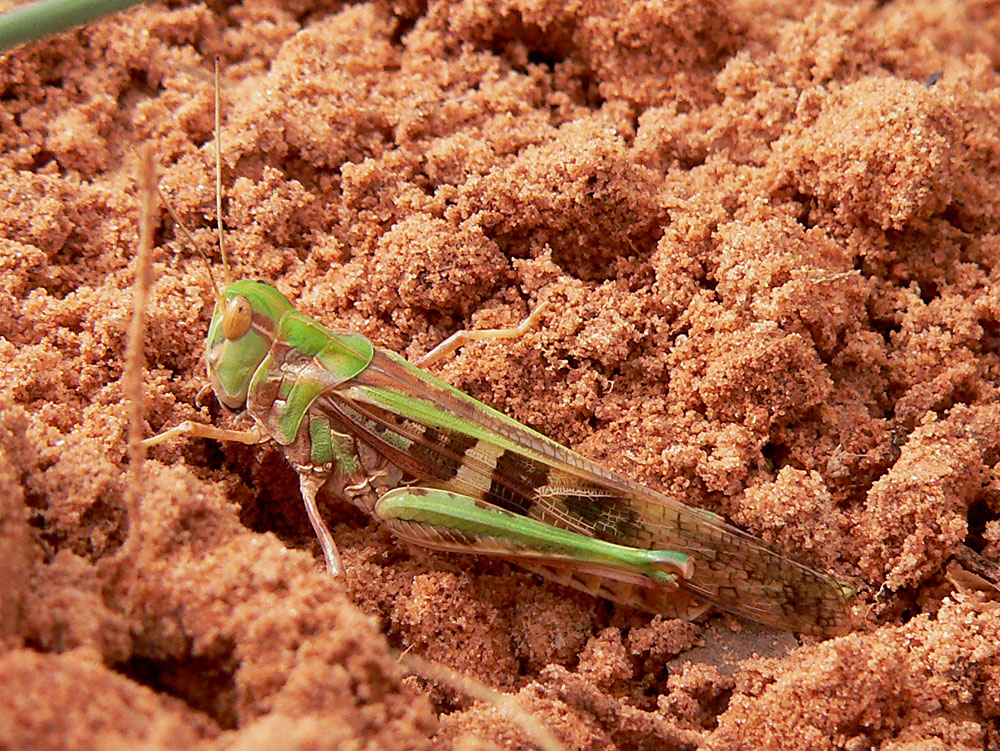
- Senegalese grasshopper (OSE), Niger

Scientific classification
- Kingdom: Animalia
- Phylum: Arthropoda
- Clade: Pancrustacea
- Class: Insecta
- Order: Orthoptera
- Suborder: Caelifera
- Family: Acrididae
- Subfamily: Oedipodinae
- Tribe: Locustini
- Genus: Oedaleus
- Species: O. senegalensis

Binomial name
- Oedaleus senegalensis Krauss, 1877

= Senegalese grasshopper =

Species of grasshopper

The Senegalese grasshopper (Oedaleus senegalensis) is a medium-sized grasshopper species found in the Sahel region of Africa, the Canary Islands, Cape Verde Islands, and West Asia. Although not called a locust in English, this species shows gregarious behaviour and some morphological change (phase polymorphism) on crowding. In many parts of the Sahel, this species may cause greater year-on-year crop damage than better-known locusts, attacking crops such as the pearl millet.

== Description ==
=== Adults ===
The basic colour of adult insects is a mixture of light beige and brown, but if they have grown up in green vegetation, a large proportion has varying degrees of green colouration, especially on the head, pronotum, and femora. The pronotum is tectiform, with an hour glass-shaped pattern on the dorsum. The wings extend clearly beyond the abdomen, the hind wings bearing a black, curved bar running from the front to the back with only a very slight interruption. This is the easiest character distinguishing this species from related ones found in the same distribution area. The bar of O. nigeriensis has a large gap in the middle, while the one of O. johnstoni is only present on the posterior part of the wing.

=== Nymphs ===
The colour of immature insects or nymphs is largely the same as that of the adults with green being predominant in green vegetation. Under crowded conditions, the nymphs develop increasingly extensive black markings. They can even form hopper bands like locusts, but these bands are not as cohesive as those of real locusts.

== Biology ==
This grasshopper is essentially graminivore. It consumes a fairly wide variety of grasses, but in the Sahel, it has a preference for cram-cram (Cenchrus biflorus). It generally attacks cereals, especially millet and maize. Adults like to eat the soft unripe grains. Grasses with a high silica content are avoided.

This species generally has three generations per year during the rainy season, but evidence for the occasional fourth generation has been found during years of exceptionally longs rains. A number of adults of the first and second generations migrate north following the Intertropical Convergence Zone. The adults of the third generation follow the zone on their way back to the south. At that time, populations have often greatly increased leading to the southward migration of huge numbers of grasshoppers, often at the time that millet is ripening in the fields. These can then cause serious damage to the crop. Though the aggregation of grasshoppers around points of light at night might give the impression of swarms, Senegalese grasshoppers do not, in fact, form cohesive swarms as locusts do.

Eggs are laid in sandy soil in small packets of about 20–40 eggs called egg pods. Practically all eggs laid by the first and second generations hatch during the same season, usually within two weeks. However, most eggs of the third generation enter into diapause and survive the long dry season as a partly developed embryo. Within two weeks of the first substantive rain (≥10 mm), about 60% of the eggs hatch, with the remaining 40% hatching after subsequent showers. This is an obvious adaptation to the erratic rains in the Sahel. In some years, the first hoppers that emerge perish because of lack of subsequent rain.

== Outbreaks and control ==
Outbreaks are frequent in Sahelian countries such as Senegal, Mauritania, Burkina Faso, Mali, Niger, and northern Nigeria, especially during wet years following several dry ones.

As with many locust species, outbreaks may be controlled with insecticide spray operations: usually at ULV rates of application and often via government or donor-aid sponsorship. A biological pesticide product called 'Green Muscle', which is based on an entomopathogenic fungus (Metarhizium acridum), is now available (see desert locust). Large-scale field tests on O. senegalensis, by the LUBILOSA Programme in 1995-97, were amongst the first successful large-scale field tests using Metarhizium against acridoid pests.

== Gallery ==
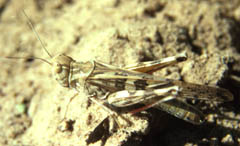
Brown colour phase

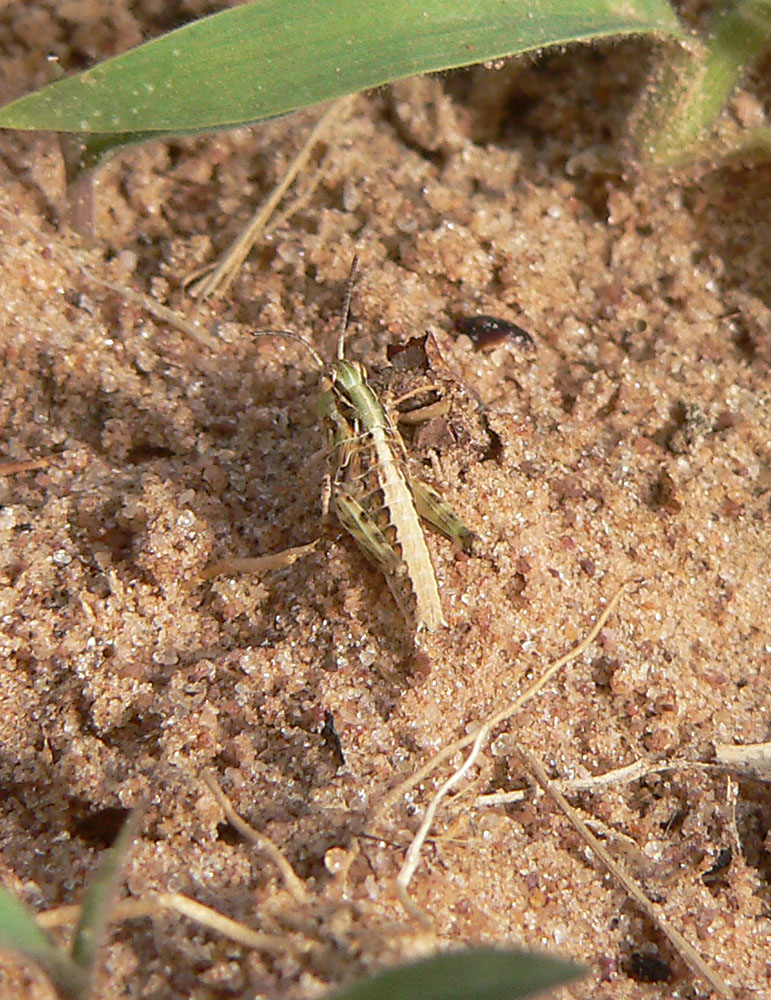
Third instar female

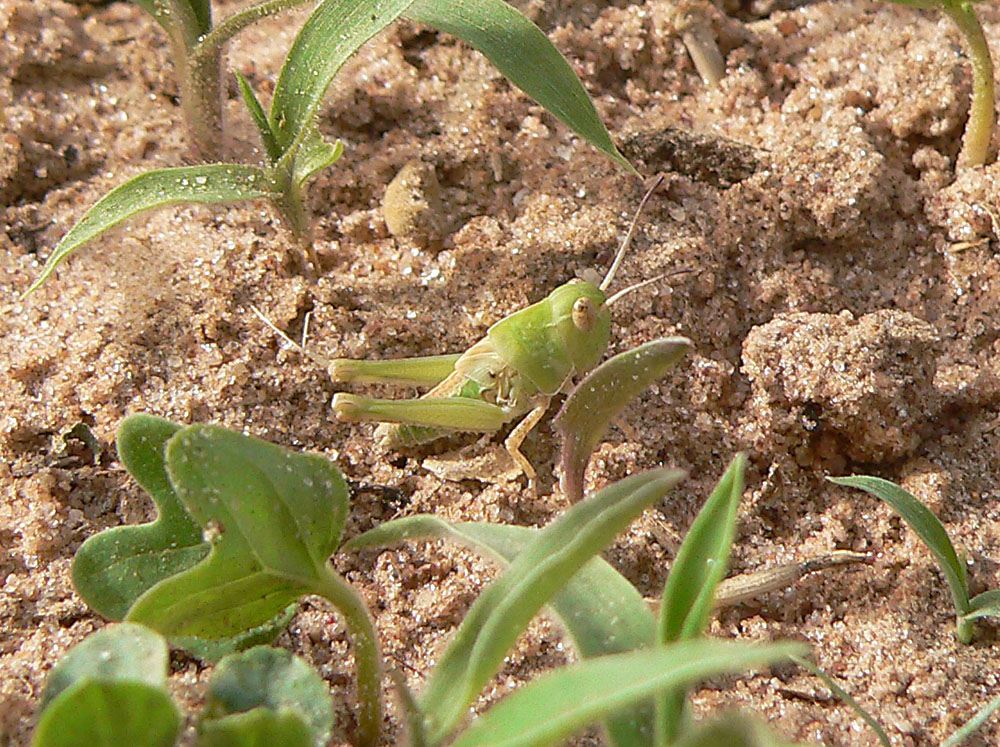
Fourth instar male

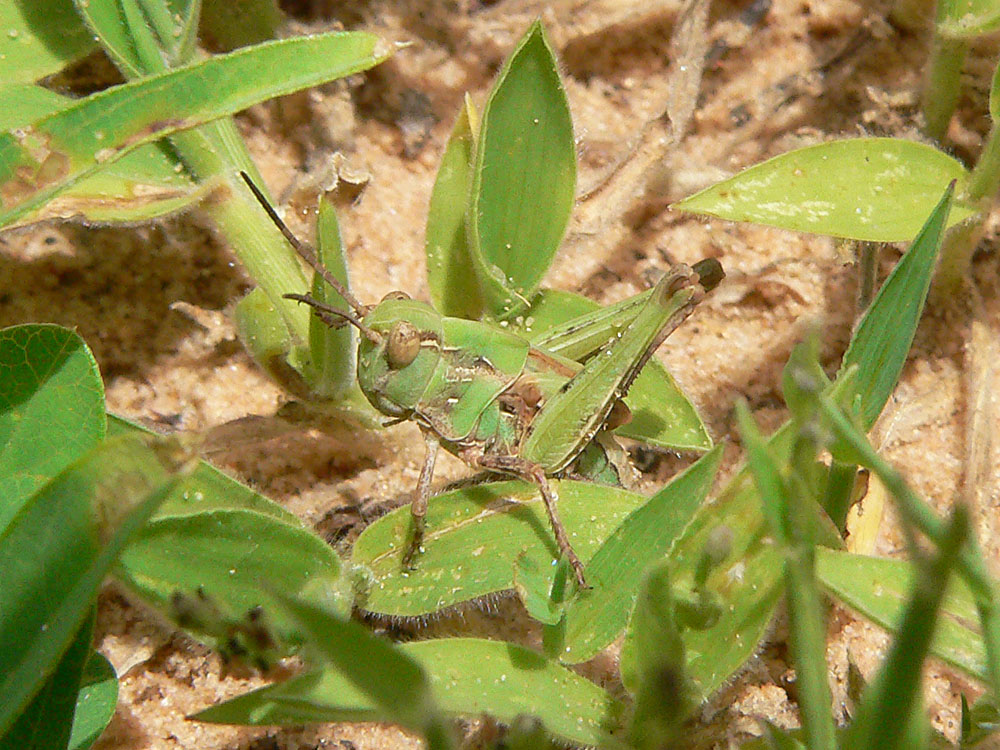
Green fifth instar

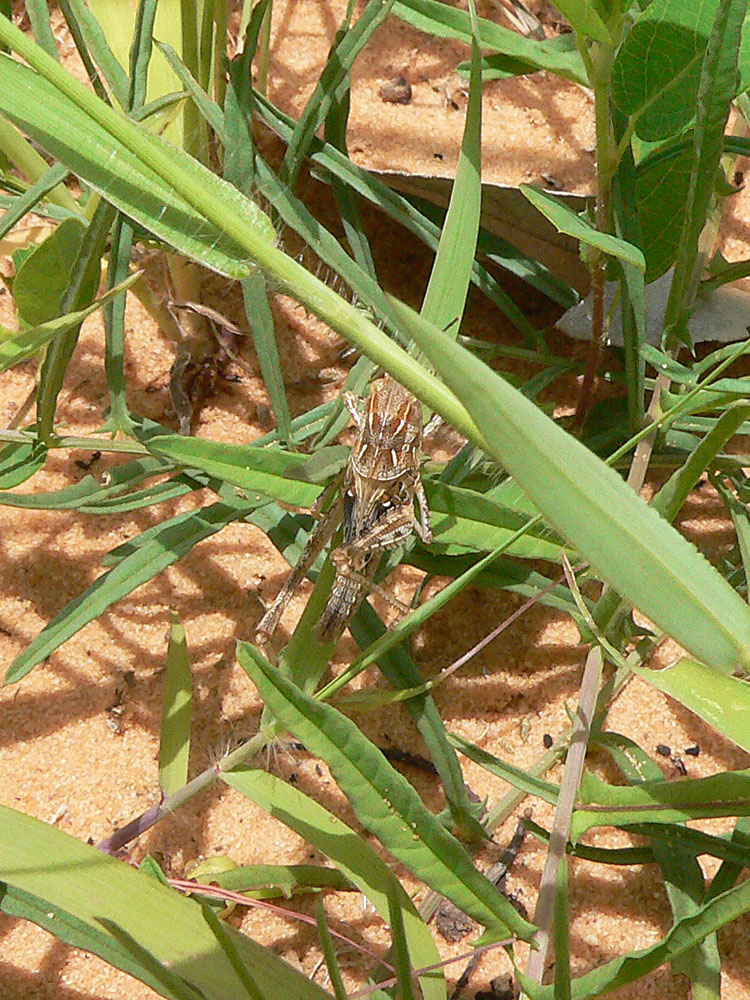
Brown fifth instar
