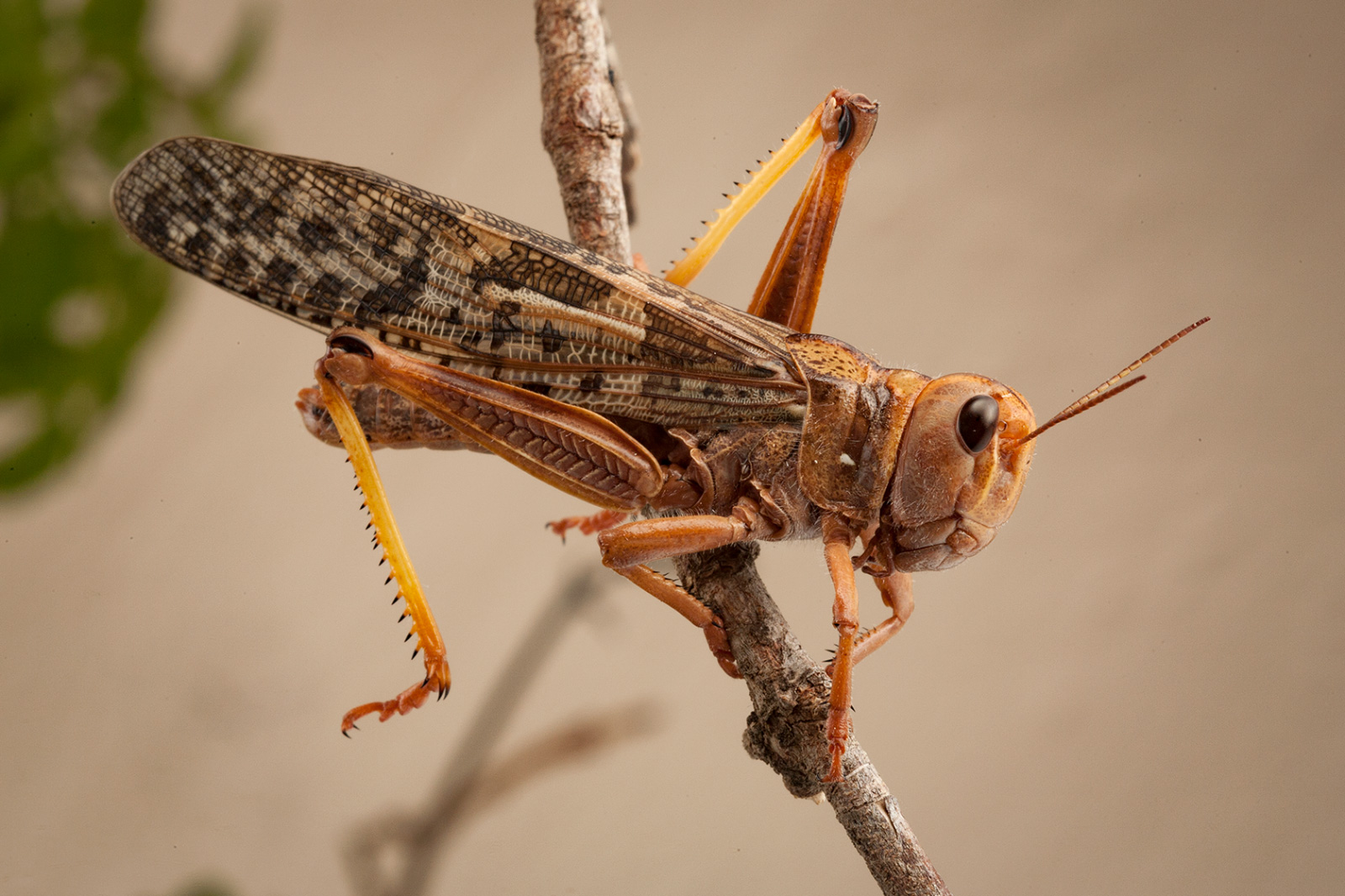
- L. pardalina adult in the Eastern Cape

Scientific classification
- Kingdom: Animalia
- Phylum: Arthropoda
- Clade: Pancrustacea
- Class: Insecta
- Order: Orthoptera
- Suborder: Caelifera
- Family: Acrididae
- Subfamily: Oedipodinae
- Tribe: Locustini
- Genus: Locustana; Uvarov, 1921
- Species: L. pardalina

Binomial name
- Locustana pardalina Walker, 1870
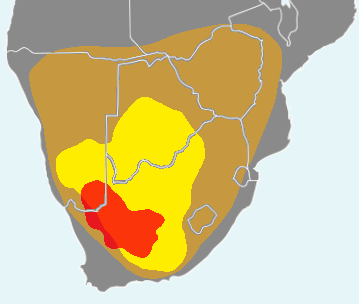
- outbreak region invasion area of 1985/86 upsurge invasion limit

Synonyms
- Locustana capensis (Saussure, 1884); Locustana sulcicollis (Stål, 1876)

= Brown locust =

Species of grasshopper

The brown locust (Locustana pardalina) is a medium-sized small locust species in the monotypic genus Locustana. It is found in Southern Africa and shows classic gregarious behaviour with phase polymorphism on crowding.

== Biology ==
"With its drought-resistant egg stage, short life cycle with 2–4 generations per year, high fecundity and highly gregarious behaviour, the brown locust regularly produces intense outbreaks. Eggs are usually laid in dry soil and during the summer months will hatch approximately 10 days after 15–25 millimetres (0.6–1.0 in) of rain has fallen. Under drought conditions, eggs enter various states of diapause and quiescence and can remain viable for up to 3 years. Incipient outbreaks generally arise following the end of droughts and are characterised by the dramatic increase in the density of the solitary phase adult population over wide areas of the Karoo. Hatching hoppers then aggregate and develop into thousands of small, discrete, highly gregarious hopper bands. For example, over 250,000 hopper bands and 40,000 fledging adult swarms were controlled in the massive 1985–86 upsurge. Swarming populations can then perpetuate themselves for a number of years, requiring an intense control effort, before gradually dying out during another drought cycle."

— R. E. Price and H. D. Brown (2000) A Century of Locust Control in South Africa. Ch 4. Workshop on Research Priorities for Migrant Pests of Agriculture in Southern Africa, Plant Protection Research Institute, Pretoria, South Africa, 24–26 March 1999.R. A. Cheke, L. J. Rosenberg and M. E. Kieser (eds) (2000) Natural Resources Institute, Chatham, UK.

Brown locust nymphs, killed by the pathogen Serratia

== Control ==
Hopper band outbreaks are frequent in the Karoo and are controlled by farmers with insecticide spray operations: usually deltamethrin with motorised mistblowers set for ultra-low volume application (subsidised by the government).

Because of the environmental sensitivity of the Karoo biome and concerns about toxicity to grazing sheep, a biological pesticide product called 'Green Muscle', based on the entomopathogenic fungus (Metarhizium acridum), was tested by the LUBILOSA Programme in collaboration with the South African Plant Protection Institute: using novel application technique to compensate for the slow speed of kill.
