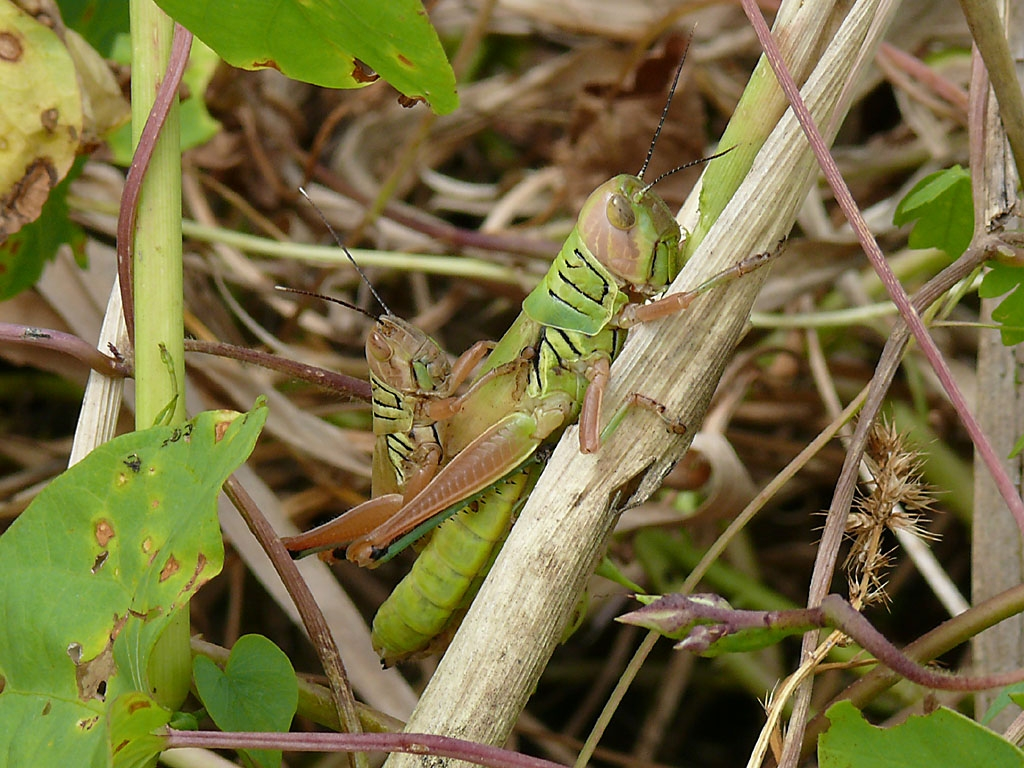
- H. daganensis male & female

Scientific classification
- Kingdom: Animalia
- Phylum: Arthropoda
- Clade: Pancrustacea
- Class: Insecta
- Order: Orthoptera
- Suborder: Caelifera
- Family: Acrididae
- Subfamily: Hemiacridinae
- Tribe: Hieroglyphini
- Genus: Hieroglyphus
- Species: H. daganensis

Binomial name
- Hieroglyphus daganensis Krauss, 1877

Synonyms
- H. abbreviata Krauss, 1877

= Hieroglyphus daganensis =

Species of grasshopper

The African rice grasshopper, Hieroglyphus daganensis is a medium-sized grasshopper species found in the Sahel region. Although not called a locust in English, this species shows gregarious behaviour and some morphological change (phase polymorphism) on crowding and may become a moderately important pest species for small-holder farmers in the region.

== Description and biology ==
=== Adults ===
The overall colour of adult insects is usually green, with a finely dotted shiny integument. Antennae are longer than the head and pronotum together. The pronotum is cylindrical, with three deep and wide sulci (grooves) crossing the dorsum.

=== Hoppers ===
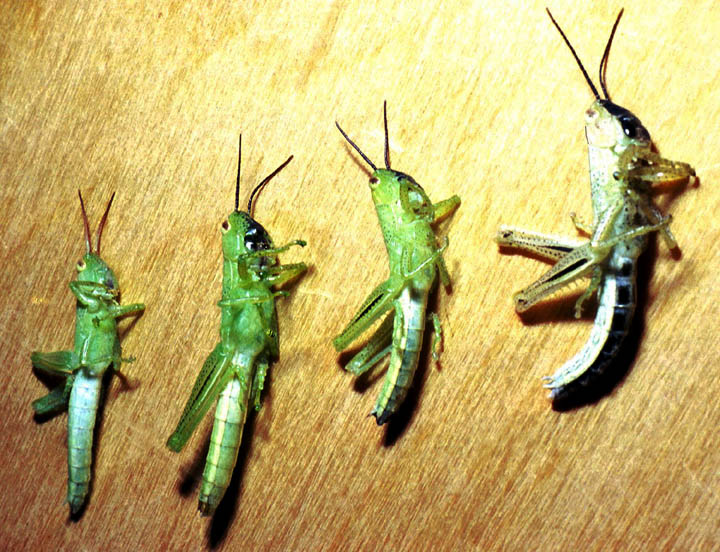
Rice grasshopper nymphs in Mali, showing darkened coloration (on right) after crowding

The colour of immature insects may vary depending on their phase (illustrated right) during a particularly fertile year, dense populations of H. daganensis showed a distinct blackening in certain areas of cuticle.

== Outbreaks and control ==
Outbreaks are frequent in Sahelian countries such as Senegal, Mauritania, Burkina Faso, Mali, Niger and Benin. It has also been recorded as a sorghum pest in India.

A biological pesticide product called 'Green Muscle' is based on the entomopathogenic fungus (Metarhizium acridum) is now available (see desert locust). Early demonstrations of efficacy took place in northern Benin, with field tests by the LUBILOSA Programme on H. daganensis.

== Human consumption ==
The Northern Dogon people of Mopti Region, Mali consume the species.
