= Metarhizium flavoviride =

- Unidentified leafhopper (Cicadellidae) probably infected with M. flavoviride: Atewa forest, Ghana (2008)

Scientific classification
- Kingdom: Fungi
- Division: Ascomycota
- Class: Sordariomycetes
- Order: Hypocreales
- Family: Clavicipitaceae
- Genus: Metarhizium
- Species: M. flavoviride

Binomial name
- Metarhizium flavoviride Gams & Roszypal, 1973

Synonyms
- Metarhizium iadini H.L. Guo (1991)

Species of fungus

Metarhizium flavoviride is a Sordariomycete in the order Hypocreales and family Clavicipitaceae. The genus Metarhizium currently consists of over 70 described species and are a group of fungal isolates that are known to be virulent against Hemiptera and some Coleoptera. M. flavoviride is described as its own species, but there also exists a variety of M. flavoviride, which is M. flavoviride var. flavoviride. Previously described varieties of M. flavoviride have been documented, however recent random amplified polymorphic DNA (RAPD) markers have assigned these varieties as new species. The reassigned species are as follows: M. flavoviride Type E is now M. brasiliense; M. flavoviride var. minus is now M. minus; M. flavoviride var. novozealandicum is now M. novozealandicum; and M. flavoviride var. pemphigi is now M. pemphigi.

All species in the Metarhizium genus are entomopathogenic, infecting a variety of hosts ranging from those in the orders Coleoptera, Hemiptera, Diptera, and Orthoptera. Hosts are often agriculturally important pests.

M. flavoviride is mainly studied for its potential as a biological control agent to mitigate effects such as pesticide resistance in plants where hosts feed on, as well as to reduce the environmental impact of using pesticides on agricultural crops.

As with other Metarhizium species, there has been interest in developing isolates into mycoinsecticides: with work carried out on rice insect pests during the 1970–80s. However, such isolates appear to be more difficult to mass-produce, so there has been less commercial activity than with other Metarhizium species. In light of new molecular techniques, we now know that references to this species for control of locusts (e.g. in early LUBILOSA Programme literature) should apply to Metarhizium acridum.

== Description ==
Historically, less than 10 species in the Metarhizium genus were distinguished from each other by morphological traits such as differences in conidial shape, colour, and conidiogenous cells. M. flavoviride was one of these, with conidia (spores) ranging in colour from vibrant green to light grey-green. Conidiogenous cells are 7–11 μm long and clavate, broadly ellipsoid, or ovoid. Conidia are relatively slow to develop. These taxonomic morphological differences were later substantiated by allozyme analyses. However, recent studies indicate that using morphological characteristics is not an accurate method to distinguish between different Metarhizium species and their respective varieties, and instead, molecular and genetic techniques should be used.

== Distribution and habitat ==
Metarhizium species and M. flavoviride have been isolated from multiple soil types from all types of climates across all continents (excluding Antarctica) and have been found to infect many different arthropods. M. flavoviride has been found in a wide range of soils, particularly in agricultural habitats; they are often found in soils associated with roots of plants where host pests feed on. Some data have supported the finding that undisturbed habitats with naturally occurring vegetation are more likely to support entomopathogenic fungi such as M. flavoviride. It is of interest to continue research regarding the abundance and occurrence of M. flavoviride as it concerns using entomopathogenic fungi as a form of biological control.

In the Shaanxi province in China, it was found that the richness of Metarhizium species decreased with increasing elevation.

== Entomopathogenicity ==
M. flavoviride is facultatively saprophytic. M. flavoviride can be free-living in soil or in the rhizosphere of plants in the absence of a host.

M. flavoviride infects mainly by penetrating the host through the cuticle and colonizes through the body cavity. The fungal propagule germinates, creates an appressorium, and generates a penetration peg which produces degradative enzymes that break down the cuticle. The fungal hyphae use the epicuticular waxes and lipids for growth. M. flavoviride secretes toxic secondary metabolites that facilitate infection of the hemolymph. Death of the host is caused by physical damage and loss of normal function.
