= Nebria crenatostriata =

Scientific classification
- Domain: Eukaryota
- Kingdom: Animalia
- Phylum: Arthropoda
- Class: Insecta
- Order: Coleoptera
- Suborder: Adephaga
- Family: Carabidae
- Genus: Nebria
- Species: N. crenatostriata

Binomial name
- Nebria crenatostriata Bassi, 1834

Synonyms
- Nebria femoralis Gestro, 1875; Nebria gestroi Csiki, 1927

Species of beetle

Nebria crenatostriata is a species of ground beetle in the Nebriinae subfamily that can be found in Italy and Switzerland.
