= Giacomo Maria Foscarini =

Italian entomologist

Giacomo Maria Foscarini, an Italian entomologist, proved in works published in 1819 and 1820, that muscardine, a disease of silkworms, was contagious. Agostino Bassi later proved that this disease was caused by a living organism.

== Publications of Foscarini ==
- Foscarini, Giacomo Maria, « Sulla malattia dei filugelli, detta del calcinello e del segno », Il raccoglitore, 8 (1820), no 30, pp. 100–104, available on the site of the Biblioteca Nazionale Braidense.
- Foscarini, Giacomo Maria, « Sopra il modo di antivenire le malattie dei filugelli », Il Raccoglitore, 8 (1820), no 32, available on the site of the Biblioteca Nazionale Braidense.
- Foscarini, Giacomo Maria, « Alcuni Cenni sopra il male del Calcinello a cui vanno soggetti i filugelli, e più sopra il modo di far la semente di questi », Il Raccoglitore, 9 (1820), no 33, pp. 49–51, available on the site of the Biblioteca Nazionale Braidense.
- Foscarini, Giacomo Maria, « Sperienze ed osservazioni di Giacomo Maria Foscarini sulla malattia de' bachi, conosciuta sotto il nome di calcinetto », Biblioteca italiana, t. 22, April 1821, part 2, pp. 59–83, available on the site of the Biblioteca Nazionale Braidense.

== Sources on Foscarini ==
- Pieces of the Biblioteca Nazionale Braidense.
- Carlo Vittadini, "Dei mezzi di prevenire il calcino o male del segno nei bachi da seta", Memorie dell (I. R.) Istituto Lombardo di Scienze e Lettere (ed Arti), Classe di Scienze Matematiche e Naturali, vol. 4, 1854, pp. 241–288, online.
- Maria Maddalena Monti, "Oltre la deferenza: il rapporto tra un proprietario terriero e il suo agente di campagna nelle lettere di Vincenzo Fiorio, Cartabbia, Varese 1815-1822", Storia in Lombardia, 2003.
