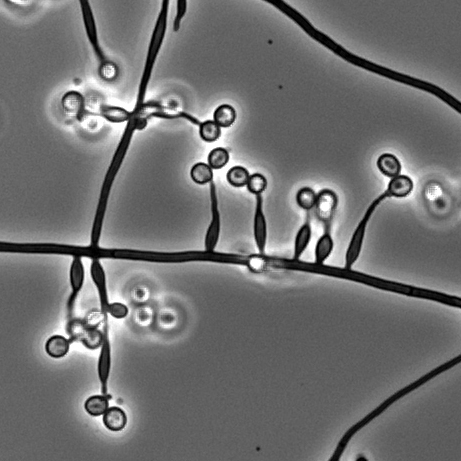

Scientific classification
- Domain: Eukaryota
- Kingdom: Fungi
- Division: Ascomycota
- Class: Sordariomycetes
- Order: Hypocreales
- Family: Clavicipitaceae
- Genus: Metarhizium
- Species: M. granulomatis

Binomial name
- Metarhizium granulomatis (Sigler) Kepler, S.A. Rehner & Humber (2014)

Synonyms
- Chamaeleomyces granulomatis Sigler (2010)

= Metarhizium granulomatis =

Species of fungus

Metarhizium granulomatis is a fungus in the family Clavicipitaceae associated with systemic mycosis in veiled chameleons. The genus Metarhizium is known to infect arthropods, and collectively are referred to green-spored asexual pathogenic fungi. This species grows near the roots of plants and has been reported as an agent of disease in captive veiled chameleons. The etymology of the species epithet, "granulomatis" refers to the ability of the fungus to cause granulomatous disease in susceptible reptiles.

== History and taxonomy ==
Originally named Chameleomyces granulomatis, M. granulomatis resembles Paecilomyces viridis. Because of the polyphyletic nature of the genus Paecilomyces Sigler and co-workers decided this species was better accommodated in a new genus in the family Clavicipitaceae. The first documented case of M. granulomatis was seen in the Copenhagen Zoo, showing morphology similar to Metarhizium viride (previously called P. viridis). This fungus causes fatal disseminated mycosis in veiled chameleons (Chamaeleo calyptratus). Small subunit 18S rDNA (SSU), nuclear ribosomal internal transcribed spacer (ITS) ITS1-5.8S-ITS2, and domains D2 and D2 of the large subunit 28S rDNA (LSU) were used to demarcate the fungal species M. granulomatis and differentiate it from closely related species, particularly M. viride.

== Growth and morphology ==
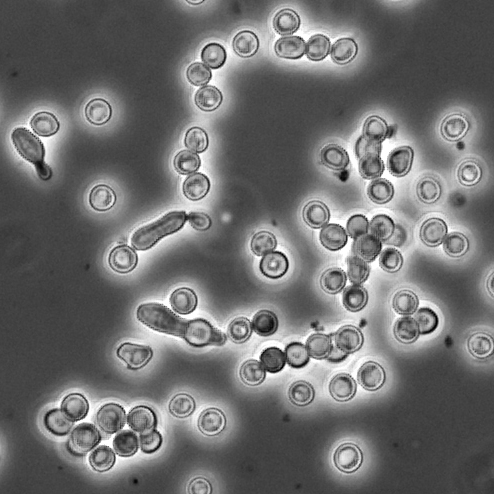
UAMH 11177 Metarhizium granulomatis in phase contrast microscopy showing yeast-like cells grown in slide culture on PDA at room temperature

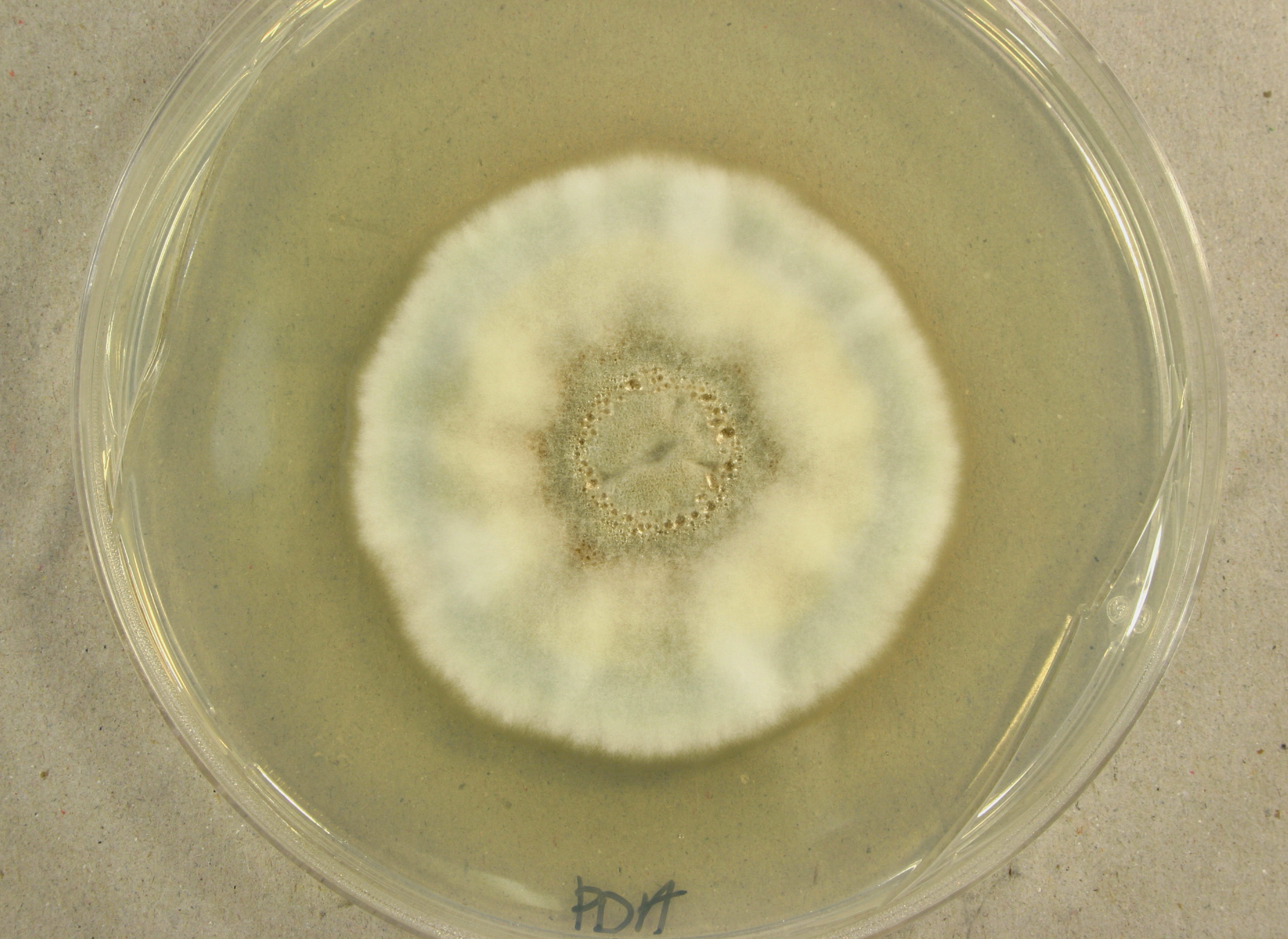
UAMH 11177 Metarhizium granulomatis in colony grown on PDA at 30 C for 14 days

Colonies of M. granulomatis differ in morphology depending on the growth medium used. Colonies on Potato dextrose agar (PDA) after 3 days incubation at 30 °C (86 °F) are white in colour and reach 3 mm in diameter. Cultures developed on Sabouraud dextrose agar (SDA) are similar in appearance although they grow more slowly on this medium. After 10 days, colonies on PDA reached a diameter of 27 mm and produced a diffusible brownish-grey pigment. Colonies the SDA are 12 mm in diameter and grey-ochre in colour. The hyphae of M. granulomatis are septate and bear phialides that have single apical openings (monophialides) resembling a wine bottle. The conidia produced are in short, curved, chains, appearing glassy and smooth. Conidia are spherical-to-oval and 3.3-3.8 μm in length by 1.2-1.6 μm in width. The fungus produces a yeast-like stage in vitro on PDA after 3 days incubation at 35°C.

== Pathogenicity ==
Metarhizium granulomatis is a rare fatal disease that infects veiled chameleons. Similar symptoms of disease are seen in M. viride. Common clinical signs seen in the veiled chameleons for this fungal disease are anorexia, hemorrhages in the tongue, necrotic toes, and ulcerative skin lesions. When observing the organs commonly infected, including the visceral organs, granulomas, glossitis, pharyngitis are seen. After death, cultures from the veiled lizard can be taken from the tongue, liver, lung, heart, kidney, small and large intestines. 1 to 3 mm spherical yeast-like yellow-to-white nodules are visible in the lung, liver and kidney.

== Antifungal treatment ==
Treatment with nystatin and/or terbinafine may prevent further spreading or infection. When isolated most isolates susceptible to terbinafine, clotrimazole, amphotericin B, voriconazole and posaconazole. Although M. granulomatis is also resistant to some of the antifungals previously mentioned such as amphotericin B, voriconazole, fluconazole, and itraconazole.
