= Metarhizium anisopliae =

Scientific classification
- Kingdom: Fungi
- Division: Ascomycota
- Class: Sordariomycetes
- Order: Hypocreales
- Family: Clavicipitaceae
- Genus: Metarhizium
- Species: M. anisopliae

Binomial name
- Metarhizium anisopliae (Metchnikoff) Sorokin

Synonyms
- List: Entomophthora anisopliae Metschn. (1879); Metarhizium album Petch (1931); Metarhizium anisopliae f. minor J.R. Johnst. (1915); Metarhizium anisopliae f. oryctophagum Frieder. (1930); Metarhizium anisopliae var. dcjhyium C.J. Dong, Jia M. Zhang, W.G. Chen & Y.Y. Hu (2007); Metarhizium anisopliae var. frigidum A.C. Rath, C.J. Carr & B.R. Graham (1995); Metarhizium guizhouense Q.T. Chen & H.L. Guo (1986); Metarhizium pinghaense Q.T. Chen & H.L. Guo (1986); Metarhizium velutinum Borowska, Golonk. & Kotulowa (1970)

Species of fungus

Metarhizium anisopliae is a fungus, the type species in the Metarhizium genus. It grows naturally in soils throughout the world and causes disease in various insects by acting as a parasitoid. Ilya I. Mechnikov named it Entomophthora anisopliae after the insect species from which it was originally isolated – the beetle Anisoplia austriaca and from these early days, fungi such as this have been seen as potentially important tools for pest management. It is a mitosporic fungus with asexual reproduction.

== Synonymy ==
The taxonomy of the Metarhizium has been subject to many reviews since the 1990s, before which the genus consisted of less than ten "species", based on morphological characteristics only. Many isolates have long been recognised to be specific, and some were initially assigned variety status, with M. anisopliae sensu stricto, M.a. var. major, M.a. var. lepidiotae and M.a. var. acridum (the latter included important isolates used for locust control). However, they have now been assigned as new Metarhizium species in light of newer molecular evidence and subsequent work. The commercially important isolate M.a. 43 (or F52, Met52, etc.), which infects Coleoptera and other insect orders has now been assigned to Metarhizium brunneum.

== Biology ==
The disease caused by the fungus is sometimes called green muscardine disease because of the green colour of its spores. When these mitotic (asexual) spores (called conidia) of the fungus come into contact with the body of an insect host, they germinate and the hyphae that emerge penetrate the cuticle. The fungus then develops inside the body, eventually killing the insect after a few days; this lethal effect is very likely aided by the production of insecticidal cyclic peptides (destruxins). The cuticle of the cadaver often becomes red. If the ambient humidity is high enough, a white mould then grows on the cadaver that soon turns green as spores are produced. Most insects living near the soil have evolved natural defenses against entomopathogenic fungi like M. anisopliae. This fungus is, therefore, locked in an evolutionary battle to overcome these defenses, which has led to a large number of isolates (or strains) that are adapted to certain groups of insects.

== Economic importance ==
The previously described range of entomopathogenic fungus isolates known as M. anisopliae, before 2009, had been observed to infect over 200 insect pest species. M. anisopliae and its related species are used as biological insecticides to control a number of pests such as termites, thrips, etc. and its use in the control of malaria-transmitting mosquitoes is under investigation. A modified form was reported to kill 90% of females who mated with infected males in a study in Burkina Faso.

M. anisopliae does not appear to infect humans but has been reported as a significant pathogen of reptiles. The microscopic spores are typically sprayed on affected areas. A possible technique for malaria control is to coat mosquito nets or cotton sheets attached to the wall with them. According to Paul Stamets, species such as this could prevent colony collapse disorder and catastrophic famine.

A simplified method of microencapsulation has been demonstrated to increase the shelf-life of M. anisopliae spores commercialised for biological control of pest insects, potentially increasing its efficiency against red imported fire ants.

The species has been shown to convert elemental lead, an environmental pollutant, into the much less toxic pyromorphite, thus showing its potential use in decontamination.

== Important isolates ==
Some isolates previously placed here have been assigned to Metarhizium robertsii; others may include:

- The ex-neotype isolate of M. anisopliae is IMI 168777ii = ARSEF 7487 (also CSIRO FI-1029) from Schistocerca gregaria in Eritrea
- A.C. Rath's isolate F506 (= ARSEF 4556; DAT 506; IMI 384583) from Boophilus sp. (Acari: Ixodidae) in USA (Florida)
- M. anisopliae isolated from Dermolepida albohirtum (Coleoptera: Scarabaeidae) include: CSIRO FI-1358 (= ARSEF 7493) and FI 1045 which is the active ingredient of 'Biocane'.

== See also ==
- LUBILOSA
- Beauveria bassiana, the fungus that causes white muscardine disease in various insects
