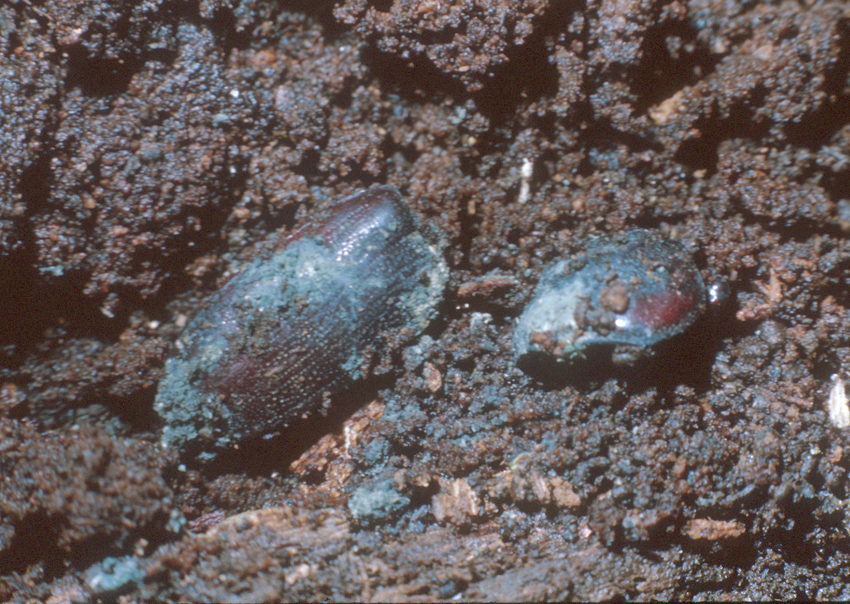
- Remains of Oryctes rhinoceros adult infected with M. majus: Dipolog, Mindanao, Philippines (1977)

Scientific classification
- Kingdom: Fungi
- Division: Ascomycota
- Class: Sordariomycetes
- Order: Hypocreales
- Family: Clavicipitaceae
- Genus: Metarhizium
- Species: M. majus

Binomial name
- Metarhizium majus (J.R.Johnst.) J.F.Bisch., Rehner & Humber (2009)

Synonyms
- Metarhizium anisopliae var. majus

= Metarhizium majus =

Species of fungus

Metarhizium majus is the name given to a group of fungal isolates that are known to be virulent against Scarabaeidae, a family of beetles. Previously, this species has had variety status in Metarhizium anisopliae (var. majus) and its name is derived from characteristically very large spores (typically 2.5–4 μm x 10–14 μm long) for the genus Metarhizium. There has been considerable interest in developing isolates of this species into mycoinsecticides: especially against the coconut and oil palm beetle pest Oryctes in SE Asia, the Pacific region and Africa.

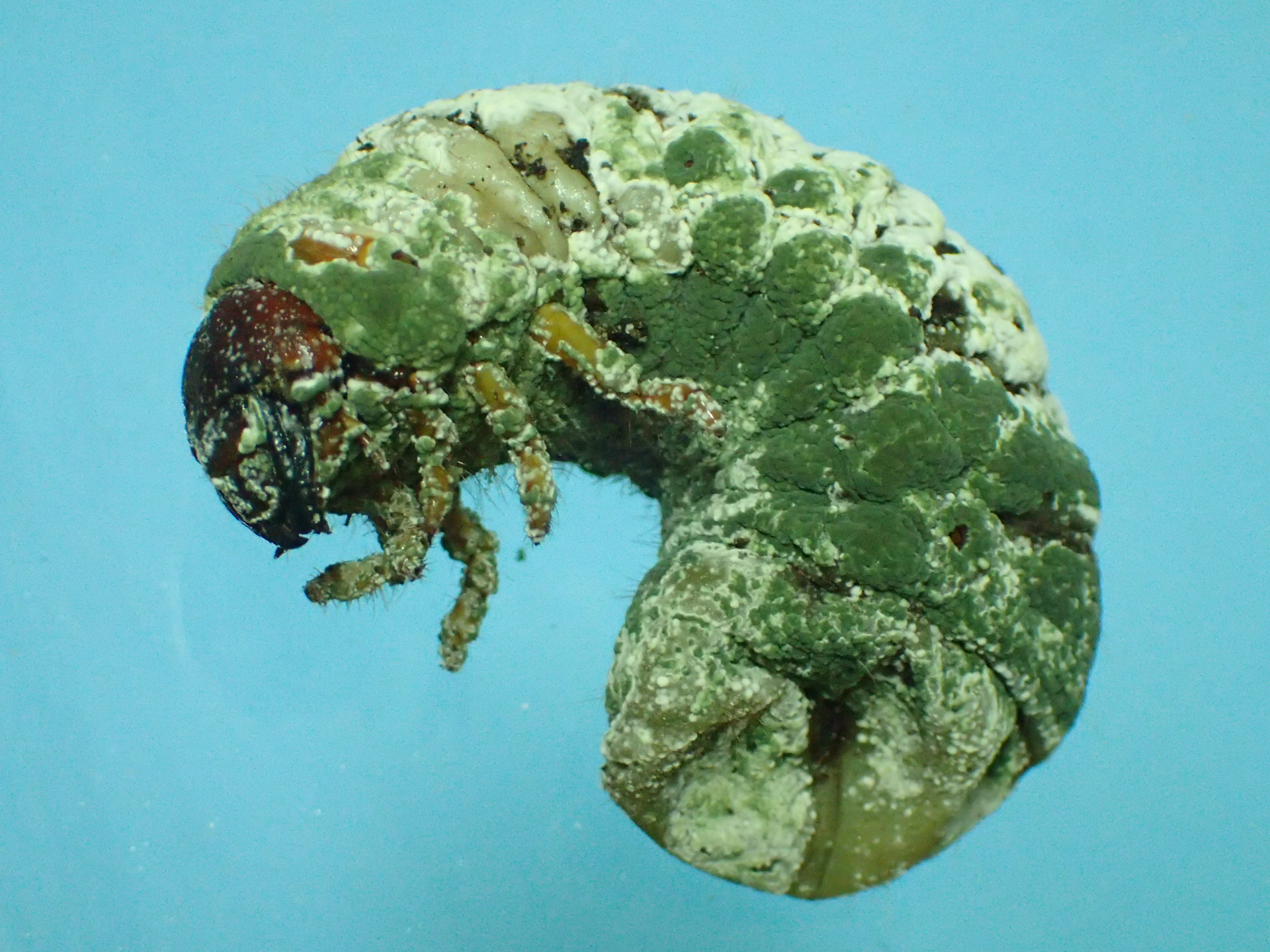
Metarhizium majus infected Oryctes rhinoceros larva with hyphal (whitish colour) and conidia sporulation/geminating (greenish colour) from its cuticle.

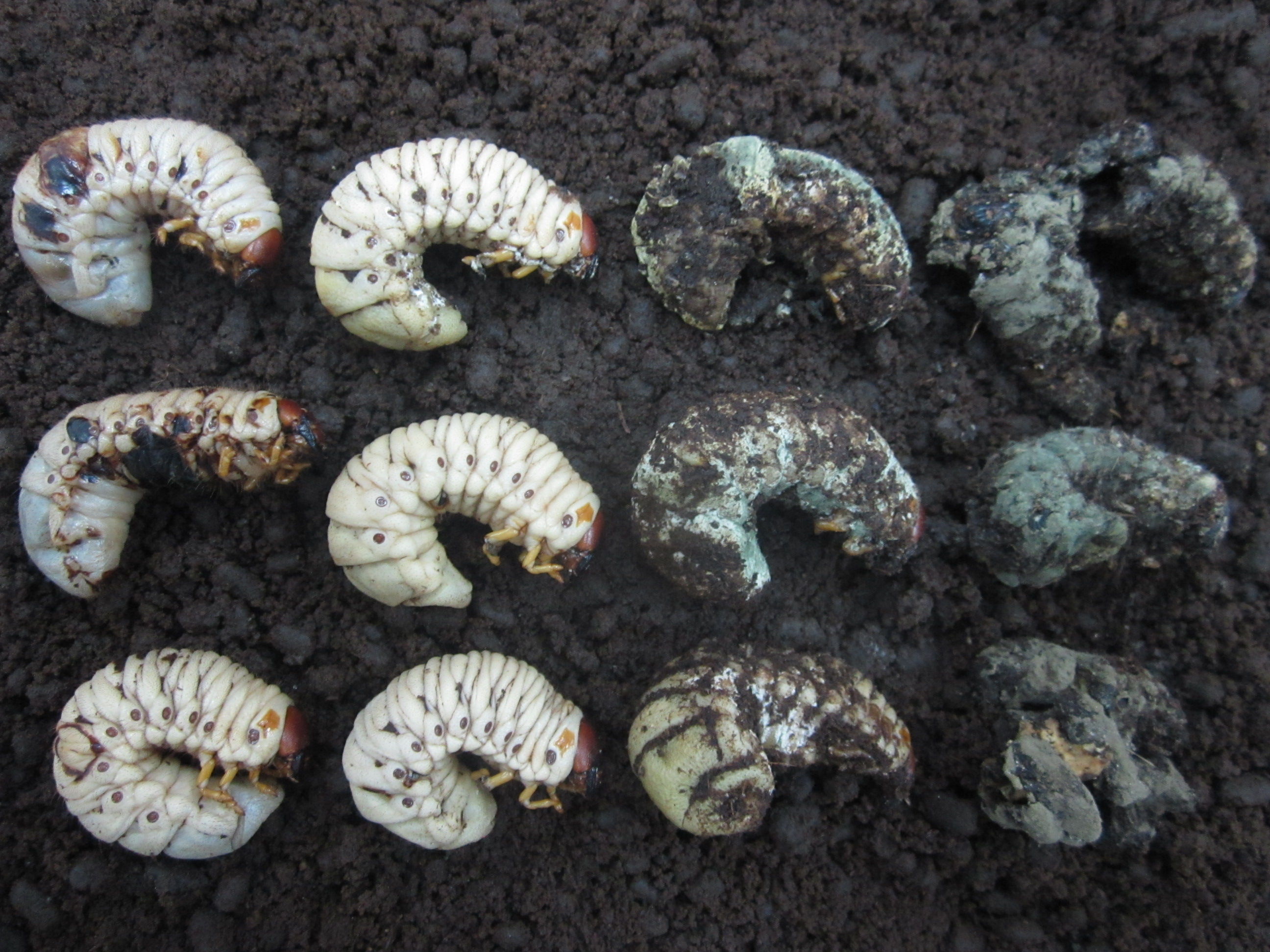
Stages of Oryctes rhinoceros larva infected with M. majus. From left to right, 1st column: Infection symptom with "black dotes" or necrotic spots on integument; 2nd: Mummified; Mycelium (whitish colour) grow on integument; 3rd: Conidia (greenish colour) grow on integument; 4th: Decomposed grubs.

It is an anamorph, a suggested teleomorph was Cordyceps brittlebankisoides.

== Important isolates ==
- The epitype is isolate ARSEF 1914: derived from a dried US National Fungus Collection culture (BPI 878297)^{[1]}.
