= Muscardine =

Fungal disease of insects

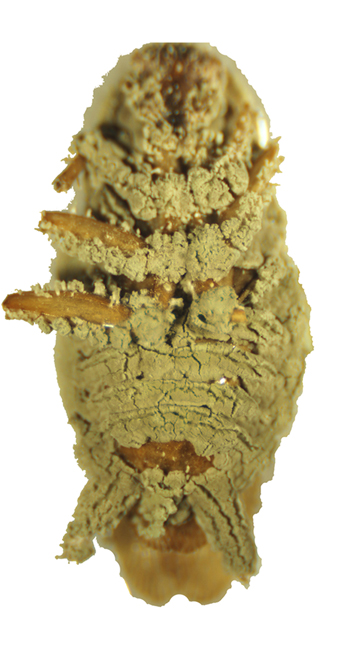
A cockroach with muscardine caused by M. anisopliae.

Muscardine is a disease of insects. It is caused by many species of entomopathogenic fungus. Many muscardines are known for affecting silkworms. Muscardine may also be called calcino.

While studying muscardine in silkworms in the 19th century, Agostino Bassi found that the causal agent was a fungus. This was the first demonstration of the germ theory of disease, the first time a microorganism was recognized as an animal pathogen. There are many types of muscardine. They are often named for the color of the conidial layer each fungus leaves on its host.

== Black muscardine ==
Black muscardine is caused by Beauveria brongniartti and Metarhizium anisopliae.

Metarhizium anisopliae can cause fatal disease in over 200 species of insect.

== Brown muscardine ==
Aspergillosis of insects can be called brown muscardine. Over 10 Aspergillus species can cause the disease, such as A. flavus and A. tamari. The conidial layer may be brownish or greenish yellow.

== Grassy muscardine ==
Grassy muscardine is caused by Hirsutella necatrix. This fungus produces an enzyme that breaks down the chitin in its host's body.

== Gray muscardine ==
Gray muscardine is caused by Isaria javanica.

== Green muscardine ==
Green muscardine disease is the presentation of a fungal infection of insects caused by members of the Metarhizium genus (now including Nomuraea rileyi), because of the green colour of their spores. Once the fungus has killed its host, mycelia invade the host's body and, under humid conditions, the insect cuticle becomes covered with a layer of green spores, hence the name of the disease. It was originally discovered as a pest of silk worms, upon which it was highly lethal. To insect mycologists and microbial control specialists, "green muscardine" refers to fungal infection caused by Metarhizium spp., whereas in sericulture, "green muscardine" refers to a similar fungal infection caused by Nomuraea rileyi. Green muscardine has been identified as disease of over 200 known insect species.

== Orange muscardine ==
Orange muscardine is caused by Sterigmatocystis japonica.

== Penicillosis ==
Penicillosis of insects is considered a type of muscardine, particularly when caused by Penicillium citrinum and P. granulatum.

== Red muscardine ==
Red muscardine is caused by Sporosporella uvella and Isaria fumosoroseus.

== White muscardine ==
One of the best known forms is white muscardine, which is caused by Beauveria bassiana.

When suffering from white muscardine, an insect larva may become inactive and stop eating. The elasticity of its cuticle is lost and it may experience vomiting and diarrhea. As it dies it hardens. The fungus leaves the body of its host covered in powdery white conidia. The fungal layer is tough due to oxalate crystals, and this slows the decay of the body. When a pupa is infected, it often mummifies. It shrinks and wrinkles before growing a fungal coating. In an adult moth, the body hardens and the wings drop off.

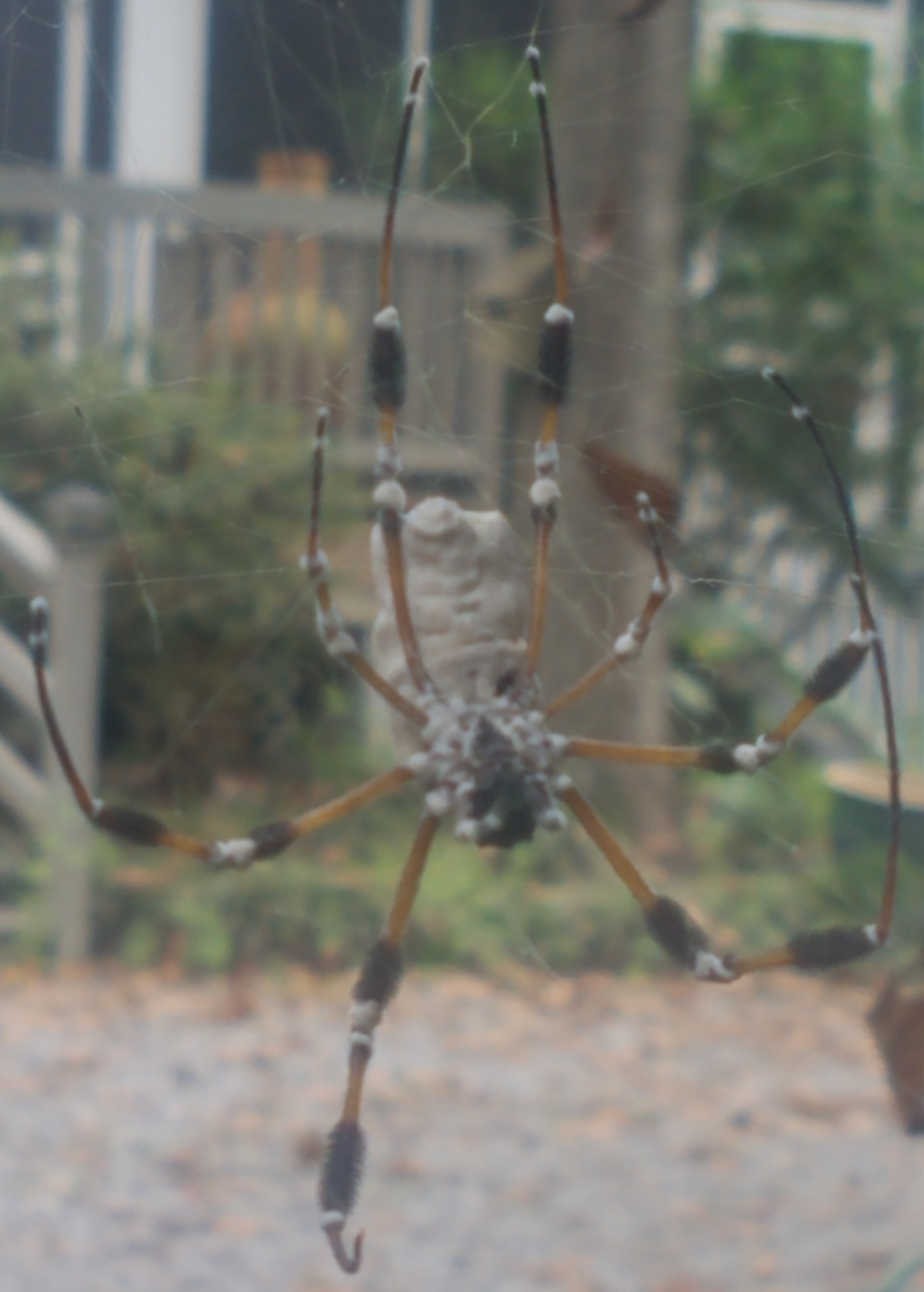
Spotted in St. Tammany Parish, Louisiana a Golden silk orb-weaver dead from white muscardine disease with white mold emerging from the cadaver's joints and pores.

During infection, the fungus absorbs water and nutrients from the host. The hemolymph of the insect crystallizes and thickens. The fungus usually produces toxins, as well. After it kills the host, the fungus continues to absorb water from the body, causing it to harden further.

Other insects prone to white muscardine include the brown planthopper and the Diaprepes root weevil.

== Yellow muscardine ==
Yellow muscardine is caused by Isaria farinosa.

== Yellow red muscardine ==
Yellow red muscardine is caused by Isaria fumosoroseus. It can produce reddish patches on the external body and powdery masses of spores internally.

== Control ==
Fungicidal agents such as azadirachtin and phytoallexin have been used against some muscardine pathogens. Silkworm breeders dust their cages with slaked lime to discourage fungal growth. In India a dust of chaff soaked in formalin is applied to the larvae.
