= Metarhizium brunneum =

Scientific classification
- Kingdom: Fungi
- Division: Ascomycota
- Class: Sordariomycetes
- Order: Hypocreales
- Family: Clavicipitaceae
- Genus: Metarhizium
- Species: M. brunneum

Binomial name
- Metarhizium brunneum Petch, 1935

Species of fungus

Metarhizium brunneum is the re-instated name of a group of reassigned Metarhizium isolates, previously grouped in the species "Metarhizium anisopliae var. anisopliae": based on a multigene phylogenetic approach using near-complete sequences from nuclear DNA. It is a mitosporic fungus with asexual reproduction, which was formerly classified in the form class Hyphomycetes of the form phylum Deuteromycota (also often called Fungi Imperfecti). M. brunneum has been isolated from Coleoptera, Lepidoptera, Diptera and soil samples, but a commercially developed isolate (below) has proved virulent against Hemiptera and Thysanoptera.

== Taxonomy ==
Within the M. anisopliae species complex, there is a tight cluster of species which is informally referred to as the “PARB clade”, based on the specific epithets of the four species originally included in the group (M. pinghaense, M. anisopliae, M. robertsii and M. brunneum). Metarhizium brunneum is sister to the remaining lineages within the clade.

== Genome ==
The genome of M. brunneum was the first in the genus to be completely assembled. The 7 chromosomes and mitogenome have a total sequence length of 37,796,881. The sequencing and assembly was performed at Swansea University in 2021.

== Standard isolate and characteristics ==
Bischoff et al.^{[1]} state: "There is no viable ex-type culture for M. brunneum Petch. However ARSEF 2107 (from Oregon, USA) is considered an authentic strain because the taxon's author, Petch, identified it and we designate it here as an ex-epitype. ... an ex-epitype (BPI 878297) derived from a living culture (ARSEF 1914) is designated for this taxon."

It appears impossible to differentiate isolates of M. brunneum from M. anisopliae, on morphological characteristics alone (with the exception of the presumptive colour mutant ARSEF 2107).

Conidia typically measure 4.5–8.0 μm long x 2.0–3.0 μm diameter: similar to several other Metarhizuim species. Petch designated a type collection from the Philippines, which he described as turning brown in mature colonies. This colour variant may occur regularly in nature based on the fact that Petch had identified a number of isolates as M. brunneum from geographically distant locations. However, the majority of M. brunneum isolates examined by Bischoff et al. were olive-green in colour (similar to M. anisopliae), rather than the buff and tan pigmentation described for the type specimen and the ex-epitype cultures, respectively.

== Applications ==
=== Varroa mite (honeybees) ===
In 2021, a custom-bred strain of M. brunneum was created to target and kill the varroa mite that afflicts honeybee populations. That strain was bred to be heat-tolerant, raising the percentage of spores that germinated at 35 °C—the temperature of a typical beehive— from 44% to 70%. A second breeding effort increased the deadliness of the strain from 4% just over 60%.

== Important isolates ==
- Isolate M.a. 43 (a.k.a. F52, Met52, 029056) primarily infects beetle larvae: and is the active ingredient of 'BIO 1020', originally developed for control of Otiorhynchus sulcatus and now 'Met52'; it is still often described in commercial literature as "M. anisopliae". Commercial products based on this isolate are subcultures of the individual isolate M.a. 43 and are represented in several culture collections including: Julius Kühn-Institute for Biological Control (previously the BBA), Darmstadt, Germany: [M.a. 43]; HRI, UK: [275-86 (acronyms V275 or KVL 275)]; KVL Denmark [KVL 99-112 (Ma 275 or V 275)]; Bayer, Germany [DSM 3884]; ATCC, USA [ATCC 90448]; USDA, Ithaca, USA [ARSEF 1095]. Granular and emulsifiable concentrate formulations based on this isolate have been developed by several companies and registered in the EU and N. America (US and Canada) for use against black vine weevil in nursery ornamentals and soft fruit, other Coleoptera, western flower thrips in greenhouse ornamentals and chinch bugs in turf.

== See also ==
- Biological insecticides
