= Metarhizium rileyi =

Scientific classification
- Kingdom: Fungi
- Division: Ascomycota
- Class: Sordariomycetes
- Order: Hypocreales
- Family: Clavicipitaceae
- Genus: Metarhizium
- Species: M. rileyi

Binomial name
- Metarhizium rileyi (Farl.) Kepler, Rehner & Humber (2014)

Synonyms
- Nomuraea rileyi (Farl.) Samson (1974); Beauveria rileyi (Farl.) Gösswald 1939; Spicaria rileyi (Farl.) Charles 1936; Spicaria prasina (Maubl.) Sawada 1919; Nomuraea prasina Maubl. 1903; Botrytis rileyi Farl. 1883

Species of fungus

Metarhizium rileyi is a species of entomopathogenic fungus in the family Clavicipitaceae. This species is known to infect Lepidoptera, including economically important insects in the Noctuoidea and Bombycoidea; there is an extensive (pre 2014) literature on this fungus under its synonym Nomuraea rileyi.

== Importance ==
In sericulture, the term "green muscardine" has been used for fungal infections of silkworms caused by M. rileyi.

M. rileyi has been considered as a potential mycoinsecticide for use against several noctuid insect pests. Blastospores of M. rileyi can be produced easily in liquid media: but conidia are preferred for practical field use. For laboratory purposes, these can be produced, expensively, on Sabouraud’s maltose agar supplemented with 1% yeast extract, but the use of grain substrates is preferred for mass production.
