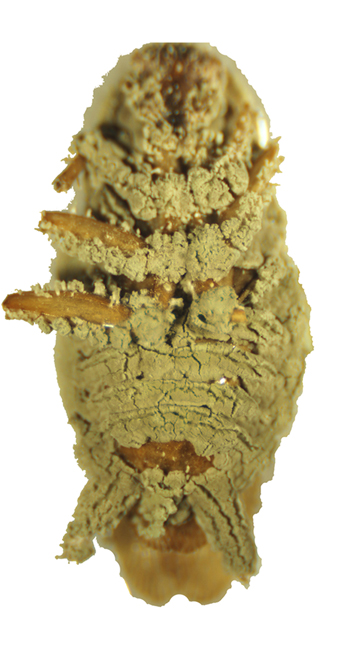
- Cockroach killed by Metarhizium anisopliae

Scientific classification
- Kingdom: Fungi
- Division: Ascomycota
- Class: Sordariomycetes
- Subclass: Hypocreomycetidae
- Order: Hypocreales
- Family: Clavicipitaceae
- Genus: Metarhizium; Sorokīn, 1879

Type species
- Metarhizium anisopliae (Metchnikoff) Sorokīn

Synonyms
- Chamaeleomyces Sigler (2010); Chromostylium Giard (1889); Nomuraea Maubl. (1903)

= Metarhizium =

Genus of fungi

Metarhizium is a genus of entomopathogenic fungi in the family Clavicipitaceae. With the advent of genetic profiling, placing these fungi in proper taxa has now become possible. Most turn out to be the asexual forms (anamorphs) of fungi in the phylum Ascomycota, including Metacordyceps spp.

== Species ==
Before molecular techniques were introduced at the end of the 20th century, Metarhizium species were identified on morphological (notably conidial) characteristics. The 'original' species included: M. anisopliae (with M.a. var. major), M. brunneum, M. cicadinum, M. cylindrosporum, M. flavoviride, M. taii, M. truncatum, and M. viridicolumnare. In 2009, nine former varieties of the type species M. anisopliae were assigned species status. New species have continued to be identified, with original names sometimes re-instated (notably M. brunneum). The first complete chromosome length genome sequence for any Metarhizium was carried out for this species at Swansea University in 2021.

The Index Fungorum currently (April 2024) lists:

- Metarhizium acridum (Driver & Milner) J.F. Bisch., S.A. Rehner & Humber (2009)
- Metarhizium alvesii R.B. Lopes, M. Faria, C. Montalva & R.A. Humber (2018)
- Metarhizium anisopliae (Metschn.) Sorokīn (1883)
- Metarhizium argentinense A.C. Gutierrez, A. Leclerque & C.C. Lopez Lastra (2019)
- Metarhizium atrovirens (Kobayasi & Shimizu) Kepler, S.A. Rehner & Humber (2014)
- Metarhizium baoshanense Z.H. Chen, Ling Xu, X.N. Yang, Y.G. Zhang & Y.M. Yang (2018)
- Metarhizium bibionidarum Nishi & Hiroki Sato (2017)
- Metarhizium biotecense Luangsa-ard, Khons., Thanakitp. & Samson (2020)
- Metarhizium blattodeae C. Montalva, Humber, K. Collier & C. Luz (2016)
- Metarhizium brachyspermum Koh. Yamam., Ohmae & Orihara (2019)
- Metarhizium brasiliense Kepler, S.A. Rehner & Humber (2014)
- Metarhizium brittlebankisoides (Zuo Y. Liu, Z.Q. Liang, Whalley, Y.J. Yao & A.Y. Liu) Kepler, S.A. Rehner & Humber (2014)
- Metarhizium brunneum Petch (1935)
- Metarhizium campsosterni (W.M. Zhang & T.H. Li) Kepler, S.A. Rehner & Humber (2014)
- Metarhizium candelabrum Luangsa-ard, Mongkols., Thanakitp. & Samson (2020)
- Metarhizium cercopidarum Luangsa-ard, Mongkols., Thanakitp. & Samson (2020)
- Metarhizium chaiyaphumense Tasan., Khons., Thanak., Mongkols. & Luangsa-ard (2017)
- Metarhizium cicadae Luangsa-ard, Tasan., Thanakitp. & Samson (2020)
- Metarhizium cicadinum (Höhn.) Petch (1931)
- Metarhizium clavatum Luangsa-ard, Mongkols., Lamlertthon, Thanakitp. & Samson (2020)
- Metarhizium culicidarum Luangsa-ard, Khons., Thanakitp. & Samson (2020)
- Metarhizium cylindrosporum Q.T. Chen & H.L. Guo (1986)
- Metarhizium dendrolimi Z.Q. Liang, Wan H. Chen, Y.F. Han & X. Zou (2017)
- Metarhizium eburneum Luangsa-ard, Noisrip., Thanakitp. & Samson (2020)
- Metarhizium ellipsoideum Luangsa-ard, Khons., Thanakitp. & Samson (2020)
- Metarhizium flavoviride W. Gams & Rozsypal (1973)
- Metarhizium flavum Luangsa-ard, Mongkols., Thanakitp. & Samson (2020)
- Metarhizium frigidum J.F. Bisch. & S.A. Rehner (2007)
- Metarhizium fusoideum Luangsa-ard, Mongkols., Thanakitp. & Samson (2020)
- Metarhizium gaoligongense Z.H. Chen & L. Xu (2018)
- Metarhizium globosum J.F. Bisch., S.A. Rehner & Humber (2009)
- Metarhizium granulomatis (Sigler) Kepler, S.A. Rehner & Humber (2014)
- Metarhizium gryllidicola Khons., Thanakitp. & Luangsa-ard (2020)
- Metarhizium guniujiangense (C.R. Li, B. Huang, M.Z. Fan & Z.Z. Li) Kepler, S.A. Rehner & Humber (2014)
- Metarhizium huainamdangense Luangsa-ard, Mongkols., Thanakitp. & Samson (2020)
- Metarhizium humberi C. Luz, L. Rocha & I. Delalibera, (2019)
- Metarhizium indigoticum (Kobayasi & Shimizu) Kepler, S.A. Rehner & Humber (2014)
- Metarhizium indicum C.M. Senthil Kumar, T.K. Jacob, S. Devasahayam, and K.C. Rajesh Kumar (2003)
- Metarhizium kalasinense Tasan., Khons., Thanak., Mongkols. & Luangsa-ard (2017)
- Metarhizium koreanum Kepler, S.A. Rehner & Humber (2014)
- Metarhizium lepidiotae (Driver & Milner) J.F. Bisch., S.A. Rehner & Humber (2009)
- Metarhizium lepidopterorum W.H. Chen, Y.F. Han, J.D. Liang & Z.Q. Liang (2019)
- Metarhizium macrosemiae M.J. Chen & B. Huang (2022)
- Metarhizium majus (J.R. Johnst.) J.F. Bisch., S.A. Rehner & Humber (2009)
- Metarhizium megapomponiae Luangsa-ard, Tasan., Thanakitp. & Samson (2020)
- Metarhizium minus (Rombach, Humber & D.W. Roberts) Kepler, S.A. Rehner & Humber (2014)
- Metarhizium niveum Luangsa-ard, Tasan., Thanakitp. & Samson (2020)
- Metarhizium nornnoi Luangsa-ard, Khons., Thanakitp. & Samson (2020)
- Metarhizium novozealandicum (Driver & Milner) Kepler, S.A. Rehner & Humber (2014)
- Metarhizium ovoidosporum Luangsa-ard, Khons., Thanakitp. & Samson (2020)
- Metarhizium owariense (Kobayasi) Kepler, S.A. Rehner & Humber (2014)
- Metarhizium pemphigi (Driver & Milner) Kepler, Humber & S.A. Rehner (2014)
- Metarhizium phasmatodeae Khons., Thanakitp. & Luangsa-ard (2020)
- Metarhizium phuwiangense Luangsa-ard, Mongkols., Himaman, Thanakitp. & Samson (2020)
- Metarhizium prachinense Tasan., Khons., Thanak., Mongkols. & Luangsa-ard (2017)
- Metarhizium pseudoatrovirens (Kobayasi & Shimizu) Kepler, S.A. Rehner & Humber (2014)
- Metarhizium purpureogenum Nishi, S. Shimizu & Hiroki Sato (2017)
- Metarhizium purpureonigrum Luangsa-ard, Tasan., Thanakitp. & Samson (2020)
- Metarhizium purpureum Luangsa-ard, Mongkols., Lamlertthon, Thanakitp. & Samson (2020)
- Metarhizium putuoense Yi Li, X.C. Zhao, Yu Wang & W.F. Lin (2023)
- Metarhizium reniforme (Samson & H.C. Evans) Luangsa-ard, Boucias & Hywel-Jones (2017)
- Metarhizium rileyi (Farl.) Kepler, S.A. Rehner & Humber (2014)
- Metarhizium robertsii J.F. Bisch., S.A. Rehner & Humber (2009)
- Metarhizium rongjiangense W.H. Chen, Y.F. Han, J.D. Liang & Z.Q. Liang (2019)
- Metarhizium samlanense Luangsa-ard, Thanak., Tasan., Mongkols. & Hywel-Jones (2017)
- Metarhizium sulphureum Luangsa-ard, Khons., Thanakitp. & Samson (2020)
- Metarhizium synnematis Z.Q. Liang, H.L. Chu & T.C. Wen (2016)
- Metarhizium taii Z.Q. Liang & A.Y. Liu (1991)
- Metarhizium takense Tasan., Thanak., Mongkols. & Luangsa-ard (2017)
- Metarhizium truncatum Petch (1931)
- Metarhizium viride (Segretain, Fromentin, Destombes, Brygoo & Dodin ex Samson) Kepler, S.A. Rehner & Humber (2014)
- Metarhizium viridicolumnare (Matsush.) Matsush. (1993)
- Metarhizium viridulum (Tzean, L.S. Hsieh, J.L. Chen & W.J. Wu) B. Huang & Z.Z. Li (2004)
- Metarhizium puerense Hong Yu bis, J. M. Ma & Z.Q. Wang 2024

=== Other reclassified species names ===
- M. glutinosum is now placed in the Stachybotryaceae as Albifimbria (Myrothecium) verrucaria (Alb. & Schwein.) L. Lombard & Crous
- species now placed in other genera in the Clavicipitaceae include:
  - M. album Petch, 1931 and other names now assigned to M. anisopliae (see synonyms)
  - M. aciculare H. Iwasaki, Tokiwa & Nonaka (2019) is now Keithomyces acicularis
  - M. carneum (Duché & R. Heim) Kepler, S.A. Rehner & Humber (2014) is now Keithomyces carneus
  - M. khaoyaiense (Hywel-Jones) Kepler, S.A. Rehner & Humber (2014) is now Purpureomyces khaoyaiensis
  - M. kusanagiense (Kobayasi & Shimizu) Kepler, S.A. Rehner & Humber (2014) is now Yosiokobayasia kusanagiensis
  - M. marquandii (Massee) Kepler, S.A. Rehner & Humber (2014) is now Marquandomyces marquandii
  - M. martiale (Speg.) Kepler, S.A. Rehner & Humber (2014) is now Nigelia martialis (Speg.) Luangsa-ard & Thanakitp.
  - M. yongmunense (G.H. Sung, J.M. Sung & Spatafora) Kepler, S.A. Rehner & Humber (2014) is now Sungia yongmunensis

=== Teleomorphs ===
The teleomorphs of Metarhizium species appear to be members of the genus Metacordyceps. Metacordyceps taii (as Cordyceps taii) has been described as the teleomorph of Metarhizium taii: a name that has now been restored.

Whether the other varieties of M. anisopliae have their own teleomorphs is not yet clear. Some, if not most, strains of M. anisopliae possibly have lost the capability of reproducing sexually.

== Natural pesticide ==
The artificially grown fungi's spores are also used as a natural pesticide. Certain strains are advised against use in food-growing fields and in close proximity to water sources due to risk of their contamination. (Note: In this case only Metarhizium anisopliae F52 strain is concerned.)

=== Locust control ===
In the 1990s, the LUBILOSA research programme proved that M. acridum in its spore form was effective in killing locusts and other members of the Acrididea families with no deleterious effects found in field trials on any nontarget species except for the domesticated silk worm Bombyx mori. It is currently produced as a biopesticide under the name Novacrid by the company Eléphant Vert in their factory in Meknès, Morocco. In 2019, the same company obtained the licence to produce and market the original product developed by LUBILOSA, which is called Green Muscle. A third product, Green Guard, is produced by BASF of Australia for the control of Australian plague locusts and wingless grasshoppers.

=== Mosquito control ===
In 2025, scientists developed a genetically engineered strain of the Metarhizium fungus by inserting a longifolene-synthesizing gene from pine trees into its genome to continuously emit the compound longifolene, which is a sweet, woodsy scent that naturally attracts mosquitoes. Prior to the modification, the fungus only emitted longifolene as a secondary infection strategy, after an insect that has randomly encountered its spores dies. The fungus can be grown on inexpensive materials, such as rice or wheat and then placed in specially designed traps. The fungal spores were lethal to 90–100% of mosquitoes in laboratory trials.
