= Agostino Bassi =

Italian entomologist (1773-1856)

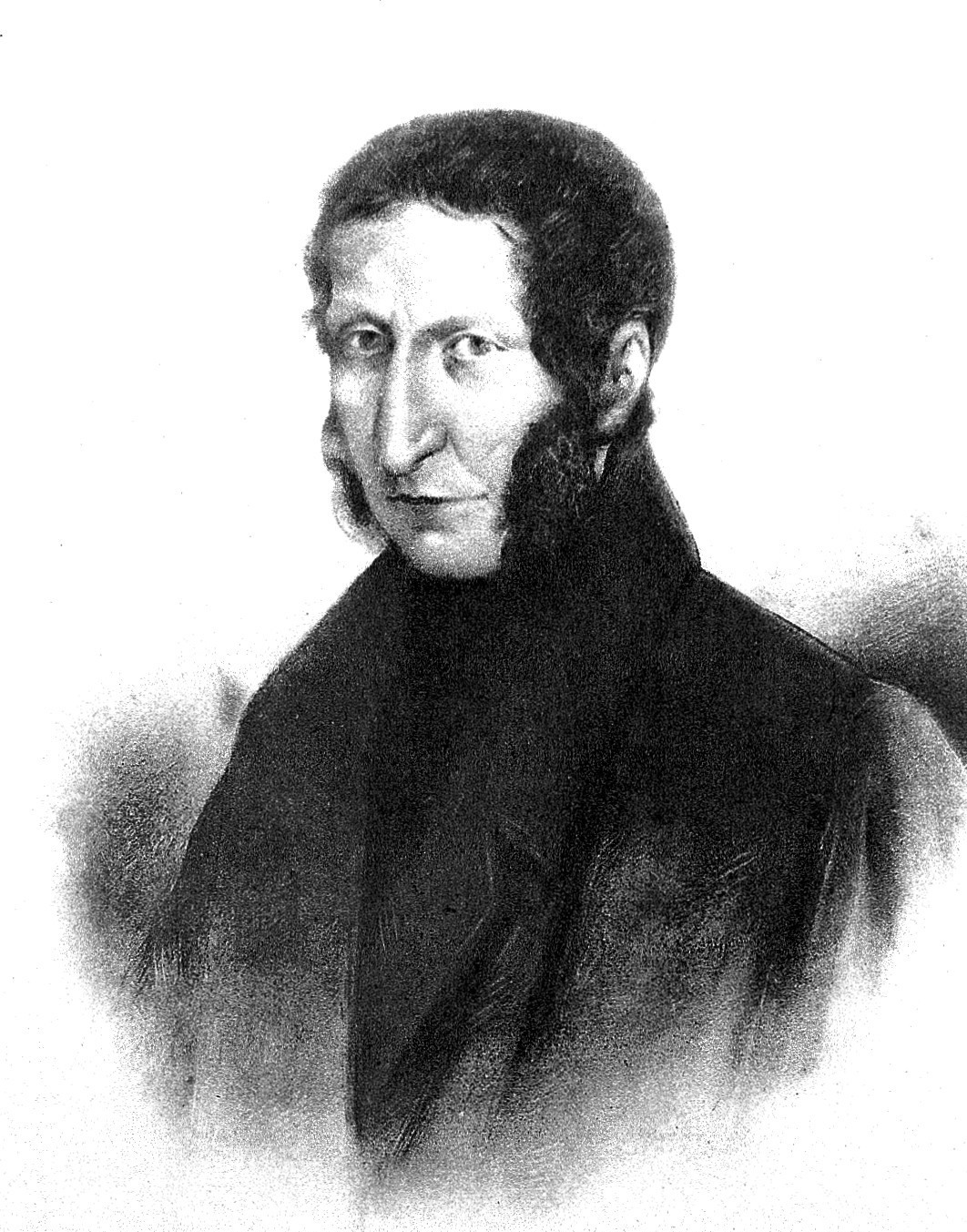
- Painting of Augustino Bassi by G.C. Ainsworth
- Born: 25 September 1773; Mairago, Lombardy
- Died: 8 February 1856 (aged 82); Lodi, Lombardy
- Education: University of Pavia
- Known for: Beauveria bassiana
- Scientific career
- Fields: Entomology

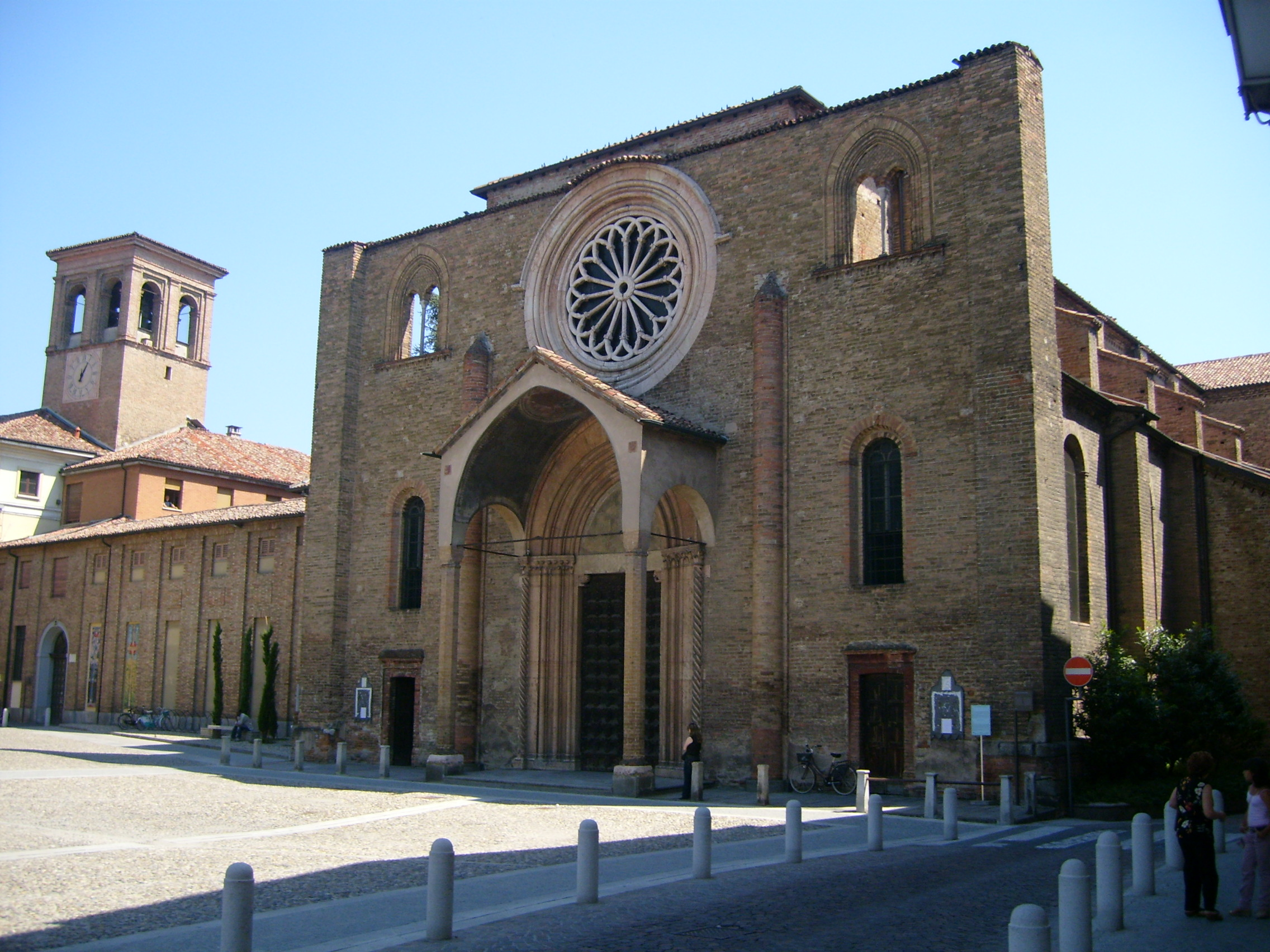
Saint Francis Church in Lodi, where Agostino Bassi is buried

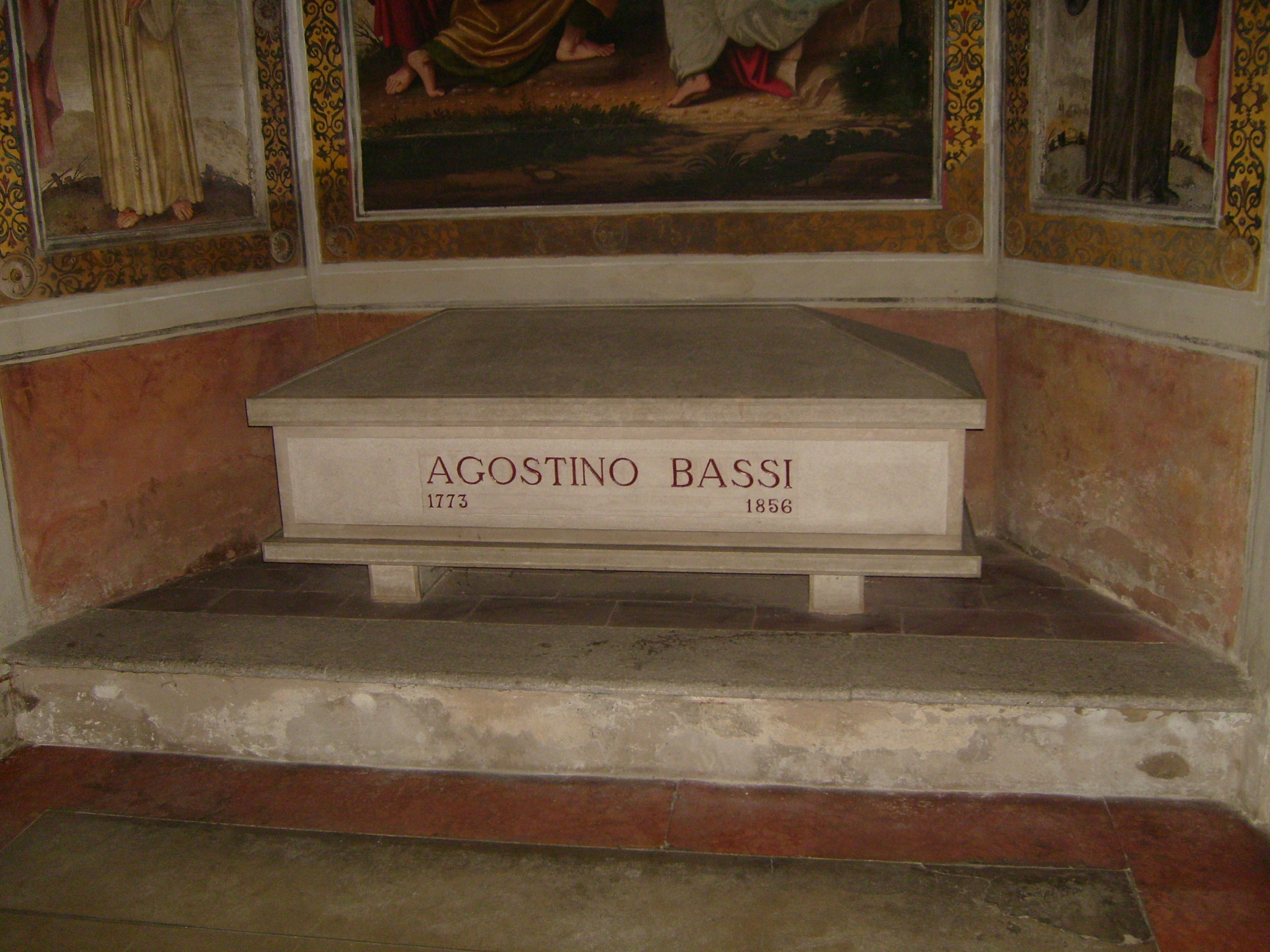
Agostino Bassi's tomb

Agostino Bassi, sometimes called de Lodi (25 September 1773 – 8 February 1856), was an Italian entomologist. He preceded Louis Pasteur in the discovery that microorganisms can be the cause of disease (the germ theory of disease). He discovered that the muscardine disease of silkworms was caused by a living, very small, parasitic organism, a fungus that would be named eventually Beauveria bassiana in his honor. In 1844, he stated the idea that not only animal (insect), but also human diseases are caused by other living microorganisms; for example, measles, syphilis, and the plague.

== Early life ==
Agostino Bassi, was born in Mairago, Lombardy on 25 September 1773. He was the son of a wealthy farmer and a lawyer who also had a passion for biology. However, his father did not want him to take up biology, but wanted him instead to look after the family's property, to become a civil servant and to join the Imperial administration.

After high school, he entered the University of Pavia, where he studied law but also followed the lessons of Alessandro Volta, Lazzaro Spallanzani, and Antonio Scarpa. He established close ties with the physician Giovanni Rasori.

== Career ==
His studies of 1807 concerned mal de segno (also known as muscardine, after a French candy), a lethal disease of domestic silkworms (Bombyx mori). Infected caterpillars are covered with a fine white powder and die. This disease initially appeared in Italy around 1805; then in France by 1841. After 1849, the silk farms were almost all abandoned because of this devastating disease. Giacomo Maria Foscarini had proved that muscardine was contagious. The research to find the cause of the disease took Bassi 25 years. He published the results of his investigations in a paper entitled Del mal del segno, calcinaccio o moscardino (1835), stating that a living entity was the culprit, and that it was contagious; we now know that the powdery appearance on the killed silkworms is caused by the production of millions of infectious white fungal spores on the dead insect (see Beauveria bassiana). He is credited with rescuing the economically important silk industry, by recommendations like the use of disinfectants; separating the rows of feeding caterpillars; isolating and destroying infected caterpillars; and keeping the farms clean. This brought Bassi immediate fame. "Del Mal del Segno, Calcinaccio o Moscardino" was translated into French and distributed throughout Europe.

From this work, he expanded on a theory explaining that many diseases of plants, animals and human beings were caused by pathogenic organisms. He thus preceded the work of Louis Pasteur and Robert Koch. He was also the author of work on the culture of potatoes, on cheese, wine making, leprosy and cholera. His work greatly influenced Louis Pasteur (1822–1895). Pasteur had the portraits of both Spallanzani and Bassi in his office.

== Bassi’s tomb in Lodi ==
Agostino Bassi was buried in the Romanesque church of Saint Francis (13th century). His tomb can be seen in the right transept, laid against a wall, at the ground level.

== Philately ==
In 1953, the Italian post office issued a stamp on the 180th anniversary of Bassi's birth in 1773. The stamp features a portrait of Bassi bordered by silkmoth adults and pupae .

== Bibliography ==
- Djalma Vitali, Emanuele (1965). "BASSI, Agostino". Dizionario Biografico degli Italiani (in Italian). Vol. 7: Bartolucci–Bellotto. Rome: Istituto dell'Enciclopedia Italiana. ISBN 978-88-12-00032-6.
- Ottaviani, Alessandro (2013). "Bassi, Agostino". Il Contributo italiano alla storia del Pensiero: Scienze. Rome: Istituto dell'Enciclopedia Italiana.
- Kyle, RA; Shampo MA (April 1979). "Agostino Bassi". J Am Med Assoc. 241 (15): 1584. doi:10.1001/jama.241.15.1584. PMID 372592.
- Ronchese, F (March 1976). "Agostino Bassi (1773–1856)". Rhode Island Medical Journal. 59 (3): 111–2. PMID 778982.
- Porter, J R (September 1973). "Agostino Bassi bicentennial (1773–1973)". Bacteriological Reviews. 37 (3): 284–8. doi:10.1128/MMBR.37.3.284-288.1973. PMC 413819. PMID 4585794.
- Huard, P (November 1956). "Anniversary of the death of Agostino Bassi" [Anniversary of the death of Agostino Bassi]. Le Progrés médical. 84 (22): 421–2. PMID 13389569.
- Harant, H; Theodorides J (November 1956). "[A pioneer of parasitology and a forerunner of the Pasteur doctrine: Agostino Bassi (1773–1856).]". Montpellier médical. 50 (3): 393–9. PMID 13407643.
- Arcieri, GP (1956). "Agostino Bassi in the history of medical thought: A. Bassi and L. Pasteur". Rivista di storia delle scienze mediche e naturali. 47 (Suppl): 1–40. PMID 13421588.
- Arcieri, Giovanni P (1938). Agostino Bassi in the history of medical thought : A. Bassi and L. Pasteur : the contagium vivum theory throughout the centuries – aspects and considerations. New York City: Vigo Press. OCLC 11342958.
- Dossena, G (January 1954). "Quello che la medicina deve ad Agostino Bassi" [Debt of medicine to Agostino Bassi]. Rivista d'ostetricia e ginecologia pratica. 36 (1): 43–53. PMID 13168166.
- Agostino Bassi (1925). Opere di Agostino Bassi n. a Mairago 1773 – m. a Lodi 1856. Pavia: Tipografia cooperativa.
  - (reviewed in L G (July 1926). "[Opere di Agostino Bassi]". Isis (untitled review) (in French). 8 (3): 497–8. doi:10.1086/358421. JSTOR 223917. OCLC 480597001. )
