= Chinch bug =

The term chinch bug can refer to a few different North American insects:

- Blissus insularis – the southern chinch bug
- Blissus leucopterus – the true chinch bug
- Nysius raphanus – the false chinch bug

All three species are in the order Hemiptera, making them true bugs.

- The entire genus Blissus of which there are 16 species in North America.

The term can also be used in the Southern United States to refer to the not closely related bedbugs.
