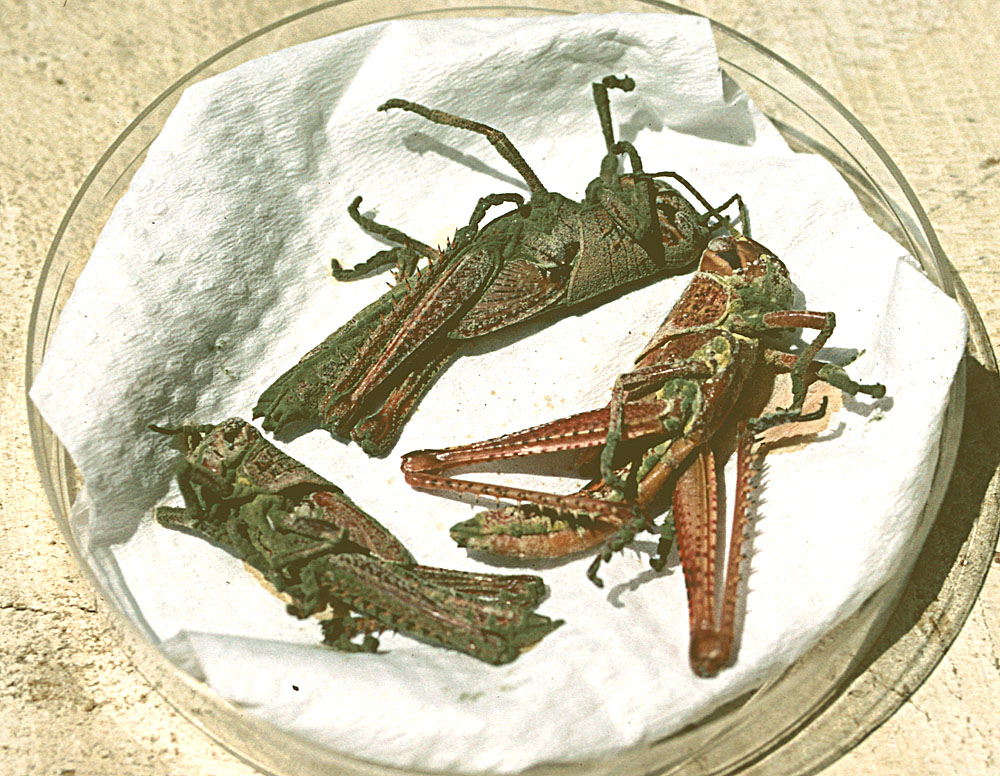
- Red locust with sporulating standard isolate of M. acridum

Scientific classification
- Kingdom: Fungi
- Division: Ascomycota
- Class: Sordariomycetes
- Order: Hypocreales
- Family: Clavicipitaceae
- Genus: Metarhizium
- Species: M. acridum

Binomial name
- Metarhizium acridum (Driver & Milner) J.F. Bisch., Rehner & Humber (2009)

Synonyms
- Metarhizium anisopliae var. acridum Driver & Milner

= Metarhizium acridum =

Grasshopper- and locust-killing fungus

Metarhizium acridum is the new name given to a group of fungal isolates that are known to be virulent and specific to the Acrididea (grasshoppers). Previously, this species has had variety status in Metarhizium anisopliae (var. acridum); before that, reference had been made to M. flavoviride or Metarhizium sp. describing an "apparently homologous and distinctive group" of isolates that were most virulent against Schistocerca gregaria (desert locust) in early screening bioassays.

== Biology ==
M. acridum almost exclusively infects grasshoppers (order Orthoptera): researchers believe that this has to do with the Mest1 gene which is not present in M. acridum. By taking a strain of M. robertsii that has a nonfunctioning Mest1 gene, researchers found that the mutant was only able to infect Melanoplus femurrubrum, which is consistent with M. acridum activity. This allows the initiation of the infection process on the specific targets. The expression of Mest1 in the entomopathogen M. acridum is triggered by substances that are only found on the waxy coat of the grasshoppers, which explains why this pathogen specifically only targets grasshoppers and locusts.

== Applications ==
=== Biological Insecticide ===
M. acridum has been used to control locusts and other grasshopper pest species: originally by the international LUBILOSA programme (which developed the product Green Muscle). This team identified and addressed key technical challenges for exploitation of microbial control agents, including isolate selection, mass production, and delivery systems (formulation and application). Insect control (mortality) depends on factors such as the number of spores applied against the insect host, the formulation and weather conditions. Oil-based formulations allow the application of fungal spores under dry conditions, and are compatible with existing ultra-low volume (ULV) application techniques for locust control.

As of 2012, M. acridum was under consideration by the USDA for release in the Western U.S. for control of native grasshoppers and crickets.

=== Important isolates ===
- IMI 330189 (= ARSEF 7486) is the ex-type of the species, originally collected from Niger: the active ingredient of 'Green Muscle'.
- CSIRO FI 985 (= ARSEF 324) is an Australian isolate: the active ingredient of 'Green Guard'.
- EVCH077 is the active ingredient of 'NOVACRID'.

== Gallery ==
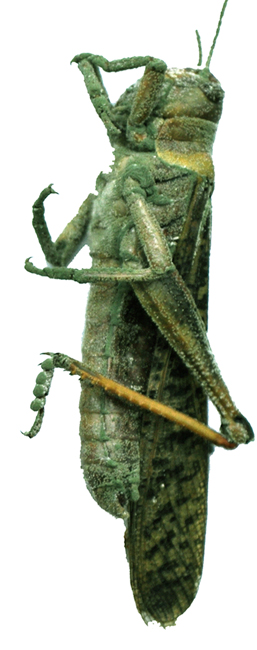

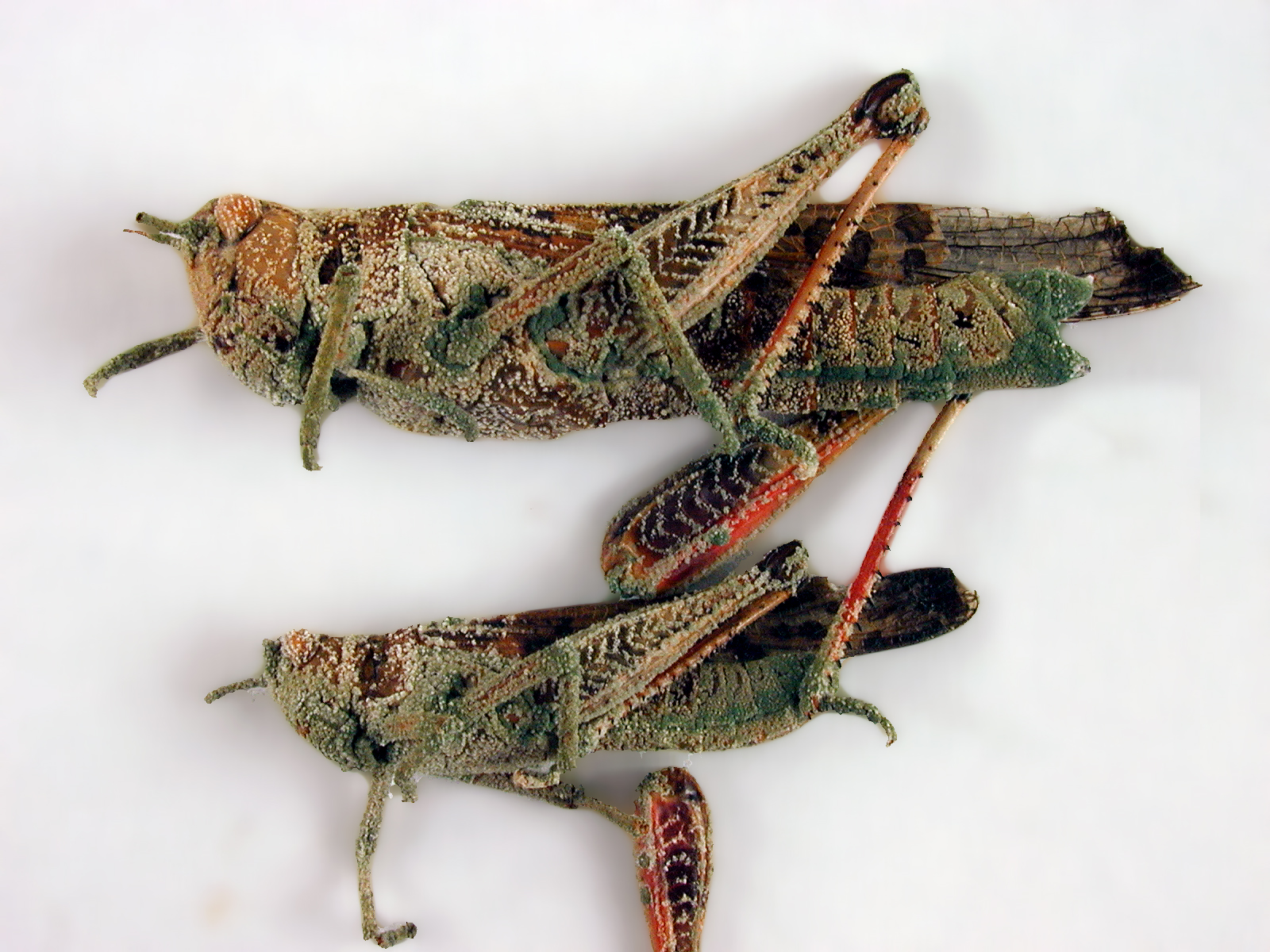
CSIRO isolate infecting Australian plague locusts

Dermolepida albohirtum larvae infected by metarhizium

== See also ==
Zhang, L; Lecoq, M. (2021). Nosema locustae (Protozoa, Microsporidia), a biological agent for locust and grasshopper control. Agronomy 11, 711. DOI:10.3390/agronomy11040711
