= Ultra-low volume =

Ultra-low volume (ULV) application of pesticides has been defined as spraying at a Volume Application Rate (VAR) of less than 5 L/ha for field crops or less than 50 L/ha for tree/bush crops. VARs of 0.25 – 2 L/ha are typical for aerial ULV application to forest or migratory pests. In order to maintain efficacy at such low rates, droplet size must be rigorously controlled in order to minimise waste: this is Controlled Droplet Application (CDA). Although often designed for non-evaporative (e.g. oil-based) formulations, ULV equipment may sometimes be adapted for use with water, often at Very Low volume (VLV: 5-20 L/ha) VAR.

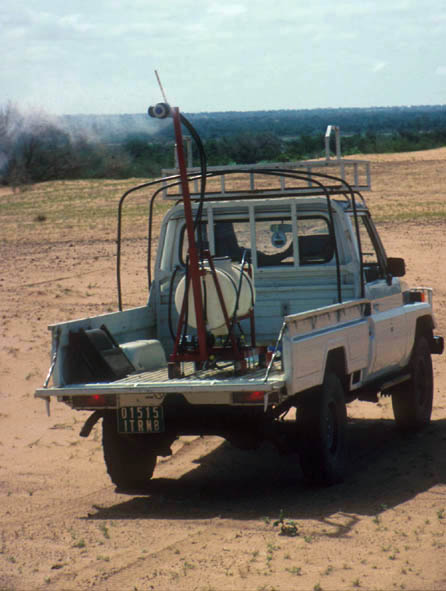
The Ulvamast Mk II: a ULV sprayer for locust control with a stacked spinning disc nozzle

== Purpose ==
ULV spraying is a well-established spraying technique and remains the standard method of locust control with pesticides and is also widely used by cotton farmers in central-southern and western Africa. It has also been used in massive aerial spraying campaigns against disease vectors such as the tse-tse fly.

A major benefit of ULV application is high work rate (i.e. many hectares can be treated in one day). It is a good option if all (or some) of these conditions apply:

- large area of land to treat
- rapid response required
- little or no water for making pesticide tank mixtures
- logistical problems for supplies
- difficult terrain: poor access to target site.

== Equipment ==
ULV equipment is designed to produce very small droplets, thus ensuring even coverage with low volumes. The equipment is based on aerosol, air-shear (mistblowers, exhaust gas sprayers) or better still, rotary nozzle techniques. An electrostatic charge may be applied to the droplets to aid their distribution and impaction (on earthed targets), but commercial equipment is rare at present.

== Ultra low volume fogging machines ==
Ultra low volume (ULV) fogging machines are cold fogging machines that use large volumes of air at low pressures to transform liquid into droplets that are dispersed into the atmosphere. This type of fogging machine can produce extremely small droplets with diameters ranging from 1–150 μm. ULV machines are used for applying pesticides, herbicides, fungicides, sterilizers, and disinfectants amongst other chemicals. The size of the droplet is very important as each application has an optimal droplet size. The optimum droplet sizes are between 5 and 30 μm for flying insects, 20 to 40 μm for leaf nematodes and 30 to 50 μm for fungi. Low volume refers to the low volume of carrier fluid that is required with these types of machines. The droplets that are created are of such a small size that less carrier for the formulation is required to cover the required surface area. The best way to understand the concept of using less formulation to cover a larger surface area is to look at the mathematical side of the scenario. In the case where the diameter of a droplet is reduced to half its original size then the amount of droplets that can be formed from the same volume of formulation will increase eightfold. If the droplet diameter is reduced to 10 percent of its original size, then the amount of droplets that can be formed will increase a thousandfold. In this way the droplet diameter determines the amount of droplets that will form.

=== Parts ===
Ultra low volume fogging machines consists of a blower, a formulation-holding tank and in some equipment a pump. The machine can have an electric, battery or gasoline engine that drives the blower. The blower creates a low pressure area and forces air through the nozzle of the fog machine. Air pressure can be controlled by adjusting the engine speed. Formulation is delivered by means of either electric, gear, FMI or Diaphragm pump to deliver the formulation to the nozzle of the machine, or in other equipment it is delivered through creating a low air pressure in the formulation tank to force the formulation to the nozzle for easy application. The nozzle of the machine has a very specific shape, which causes a swirling motion of the air stream. The motion is achieved by means of several stationary fins that force the air to rotate. The formulation is delivered to the air by means of a supply tube that is situated in the center of the nozzle. The motion of the air shears the liquid formulation into very small droplets and then disperses it into the atmosphere.

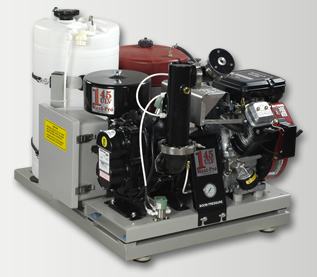
Typical large ULV cold fogging machine. Max Pro 145 model from Dyna-fog Africa

ULV fogging machines are the most preferred misting machines as the size of the droplets can be controlled by means of machine calibration.

=== Advantages and disadvantages ===
The chemicals used in this type of machine are more concentrated than the chemicals used in other spraying equipment, which also increases the killing efficiency. Other advantages of ULV misting machines includes lower risks of injury due to the fog cloud being nearly invisible, low volumes of carrier chemicals, lower application cost and low noise levels. Unfavorable aspects of these machines may include longer application times, wind drift, high concentrations of active ingredients causing environmental hazards, and the requirement of higher technical skills for calibration of the machines.

=== Applications ===
ULV fogging machines can be used in a number of different industries. Some applications includes pest control: mosquito control, bird control, agricultural applications such as grain storage, disinfectant purposes such as hospitals and laboratories, mold control and surface decontamination. A specific application for ULV machines that have been well researched is protecting avocado trees from different diseases. The most common diseases that these trees are prone to suffer from includes Cercospora spot, anthracnose and stem-end rot. The diseases affecting the avocado trees are controlled by applying high volume copper oxychloride fungicides to the trees. The original application techniques included the use of a hand gun sprayer. This technique posed the problem of high run-off of the formulation. The use of ULV machines for the application of the pesticide formulation yielded more than 80 percent healthy fruit that was free from Cercospora spot. These results compared very favorably with the traditional method of using a hand gun sprayer. Another industry that have benefited substantially from the technology provided by ULV fogging machines is the chicken industry. This industry suffers great losses due to the litter beetle and Aspergillus fungi. ULV fogging machines offers great solutions to kill both these pests in chicken houses.

Another industry that uses fogging equipment is the cleaning industry, in particular the pre-occupation cleaning industry. Where there's construction, there's dust. Dust particles can vary in size, some dust particles are 5 micron and larger, other may be smaller. The dust created as a byproduct of cutting tiles or concrete can be as small as 1 micron. The real world implication of this is that a surface is always at risk of being layered in dust even though the surface has been thoroughly cleaned due to the dust laden air. This causes havoc during the commissioning stages of sensitive equipment that require near perfect conditions in which to do the testing of the equipment that are being commissioned. In these cases, ULV fogging machines are placed in strategic locations throughout a facility prior to the first cleaning phases. The ULV fogging equipment disperses water into the atmosphere that binds to the dust particles ultimately bringing the dust down against the walls and on the floor. This allows the ambient air to be free of dust contamination ensuring the cleaning of the fogged room is more effectively done. When this application is planned, ensure that all electrical outlets have been taken through the correct LOTO (Lock Out Tag Out) procedures ensuring a safe working environment. It is also prudent to enclose all electrical sockets and switches with water resistant material such as plastic bags and tape.

== See also ==
- Aerial spraying
- Locust control
- Pesticide application
