= Genetic isolate =

Population with low external genetic mixing

A genetic isolate is a population of organisms that has little to no genetic mixing with other organisms of the same species due to geographic isolation or other factors that prevent reproduction. Genetic isolates form new species through an evolutionary process known as speciation. All modern species diversity is a product of genetic isolates and evolution.

The current distribution of genetic differences and isolation within and among populations is also influenced by genetic processes. The resulting genetic diversity within a species' distribution range is frequently unequally distributed, and significant disparities can occur when population dispersion and isolation are critical for species survival.

The interrelationship of genetic drift, gene flow, and natural selection determines the level and dispersion of genetic differences between populations and among species assemblages. Geographic and natural elements may likewise add to these cycles and lead to examples of hereditary variety, such as genetic differences that cause genetic isolation. Genetic variations are often unequally distributed over a species' geographic distribution, with differences between populations at the geographic center and the range's extremities.

Significant gene flow occurs in core populations, resulting in genetic uniformity. In contrast, low gene flow, severe genetic drift, and diverse selection conditions occur in range periphery populations, enhancing genetic isolation and heterogeneity among people. Genetic differentiation resulting from genetic isolation occurs as significant alterations in genetic variations, such as fluctuations in allelic frequencies, accumulate over time.

Significant genetic diversity can be detected toward the limits of a species range, where population fragmentation and isolation are more likely to affect genetic processes. Regional splitting is produced by a variety of factors, including environmental processes that regularly change a species' indigenous distribution. For example, human-caused environmental changes such as deforestation and land degradation can result in rapid changes in a species' distribution, leading to population decrease, segmentation, and regional isolation.

== Definition ==
Genetic isolation is a population of organisms that has little to no genetic mixing with other organisms of the same species. Such isolation may lead to speciation, but this is not guaranteed. Genetic isolates may form new species in several ways:

- Allopatric speciation, in which two populations of the same species are geographically isolated from one another by an extrinsic barrier and evolve intrinsic (genetic) reproductive isolation.
- Peripatric speciation, in which a small group of a population is separated from the main body and experiences genetic drift.
- Parapatric speciation, in which two diverging populations are separate but do overlap somewhat; partial separation is afforded by geography, so individuals of each species may come in contact from time to time, but selection for specific behaviors or mechanisms may prevent breeding between the two groups.
- Sympatric speciation, in which species diverge while inhabiting the same place.

Human-driven genetic isolates include restricted breeding of dogs or a community living secluded away from others, such as Tristan da Cunha or the Pitcairn Islands. More significant and less secluded human genetic isolates include groups of people like the Sardinians or the Finns.

Genetic isolation, in combination with diminishing habitat quality and a limited population density, is likely to result in a population's collapse and ultimate extinction. Random mutation rate, drift, high rates of inbreeding, restricted gene flow, and regional extinction have all been shown to increase with isolation. Varying climatic conditions, such as particular geographic climatic changes, can cause pressures that drastically change a species' genetic composition, yielding genetic differences through different selection processes as well as leading to increased genetic isolation within populations.

Environmental heterogeneity has historically been identified as a vital source of genetic variations and distinctions due to isolation, and several studies have found correlations between neutral genetic differences, ecological heterogeneity, and genetic isolation. The genetic isolation and different associations in regional heterogeneity could be cited as evidence of diversifying selection working across entire genomes, encompassing manifestly neutral genes. They can be used to predict the long-term effects of environmental factors on genetic diversity and isolation.

== Genetic isolation by environment or distance ==
Strong gene flow across populations can help local adaptation by bringing new genetic variations into population groups, but it can also impede adaptation by overwhelming locally beneficial genes. Population size, genetic diversity, and the environment can all affect the outcome. Isolation by distance (IBD), wherein population growth rates and immigration numbers are inversely proportional to population distance, may correlate gene flow patterns with geographic distance. Gene flow may also follow patterns of isolation by habitat, with higher rates of gene flow among an increasingly common form. Moreover, gene flow may be greatest across dissimilar areas. When the population size is limited, and individuals are subjected to strong selection, gene flow can boost population numbers, even if the phenotypes that arise are generally mis-adapted. This can lead to increases in genetic differences that lead to isolation, allowing new adaptations to take hold.

=== The Influence of dispersal and diet on patterns of genetic isolation ===
Gene flow across populations is considered key in evolving local adaptations and speciation. Assessing genetic separation by distance is necessary to determine the impacts of dispersal ability and food breadth on genetic population structure. Strong dispersers have a mild IBD (isolation by distance) because of the homogenizing effects of gene flow, whereas stationary species have limited gene flow, which permits nearly all populations to isolate. Genetic uniformity is achieved at small geographical scales in intermediate dispersers, whereas limited dispersal increases genetic variability across vast distances. IBD is also thought to rise with decreasing food breadth, putting the theory that specialization promotes speciation by affecting population genetic subdivision to the test. In studies of IBD, the number of people is more essential than the number of multiple alleles per locus.

=== Genetic isolation in sympatric species ===
Adaptation to diverse positions and climatic conditions could be a significant source of genetic differences and population isolation. Pleiotropic-induced sexual selection between individuals of these genetically diverse populations can be caused by biological features selected for in each habitat. Such conditions could make sympatric speciation easier. For example, successful host transitions in phytophagous insects provide compelling evidence for ecological diversification in sympatric speciation.

=== Current patterns of genetic isolation on islands ===
The genetic structure of species on an isolated island is influenced by a range of environmental variables, with some species being influenced by single contours and others being influenced by many species. Sister species and congenerics have various contributing elements to isolation within species. Individuals from several vegetation types on an island are often genetically connected, demonstrating that ecological and climatic factors have a role in determining gene flow configurations on a small island.

=== Genetic isolation in fragmented populations ===
The link between statistical genetic differences and population size has received scant scientific attention, even though small populations have less genetic variation at marker loci. Researchers have shown that in smaller fragmented meta-populations, both neutral and quantifiable genetic variation is reduced, and both drift and selection change is amplified.

=== Genetic isolation and the burden of genetic diversity ===
Species with enormous ecological amplitudes, on the whole, have a lot of genetic diversity. On the other hand, more specialized species with small ecological amplitude and frequency have minimal genetic diversity. Inbreeding depressions may pose the greatest threat to species with moderate habitat demands and substantial genetic diversity.

== Advantages ==
In most situations, highly specialized species are constrained to a small portion of the accessible environment. This ecological specialization, and consequently geographical constraint of indigenous populations, is frequently accompanied by a reduction in gene flow, resulting in small population sizes and genetic differentiation. As a result, due to genetic isolation, such species can only survive if they are suited to minimal genetic isolation.

In the search for lethal genes, genetic isolates with a background of a small founding population, long-term isolation, and population bottlenecks are invaluable resources. Specific rare, monogenic disorders get enhanced, and families with numerous sick members become common enough to be employed in locus-identifying linkage analyses. Besides that, most cases are caused by the same mutation, and diseased alleles expose the linkage of disequilibrium with molecular markers over strong genetic distances, making disease locus recognition easier in small study samples with few individuals affected using a similarity search for a shared genotype. The presence of disequilibrium linkage in disease alleles enhances linkage analysis and aids in determining the precise position of the disease locus on the genome sequence.

== Disadvantages ==
Many species fall somewhere between generalist and specialist on the generalist-specialist range. Such species generally exhibit moderate environmental specialization, being neither pure generalists nor pure specialists, resulting in fluid changes that must be evaluated when categorizing species. Despite their considerable habitat specialization, environmentally transitional species generally do not exhibit the low genetic diversity seen in pure specialists, but instead exhibit species-specific genetic differences on the scale with generalists. Conversely, these taxa are categorized as far more endangered than their degree of specialization would suggest. This scenario can be harmful in the progression of population decline and may be one of the promoters of extinction in this instance, owing to the genomic instability of populations and unpredictable aggregation of detrimental genes.

== See also ==
- Language isolate
- Linkage disequilibrium
