= Fosdesdenosine sipalabenamide =

Clinical data
- Other names: NUC-7738

Identifiers
- IUPAC name: benzyl (2S)-2-[[[(2S,4R,5R)-5-(6-aminopurin-9-yl)-4-hydroxyoxolan-2-yl]methoxy-phenoxyphosphoryl]amino]propanoate
- CAS Number: 2348493-39-8
- PubChem CID: 166177279
- DrugBank: DB19148
- ChemSpider: 127408951
- UNII: Y7BFN2M72F
- ChEMBL: ChEMBL5277528

Chemical and physical data
- Formula: C_{26}H_{29}N_{6}O_{7}P
- Molar mass: 568.527 g·mol^{−1}
- 3D model (JSmol): Interactive image
- SMILES: C[C@@H](C(=O)OCC1=CC=CC=C1)NP(=O)(OC[C@@H]2C[C@H]([C@@H](O2)N3C=NC4=C(N=CN=C43)N)O)OC5=CC=CC=C5
- InChI: InChI=InChI=1S/C26H29N6O7P/c1-17(26(34)36-13-18-8-4-2-5-9-18)31-40(35,39-19-10-6-3-7-11-19)37-14-20-12-21(33)25(38-20)32-16-30-22-23(27)28-15-29-24(22)32/h2-11,15-17,20-21,25,33H,12-14H2,1H3,(H,31,35)(H2,27,28,29)/t17-,20-,21+,25+,40?/m0/s1; Key:UDLWWGQHMQIYCV-LKKHFEEPSA-N

Fosdesdenosine sipalabenamide is an investigational new drug that is being evaluated for the treatment of advanced solid tumors and lymphoma. This compound is a phosphoramidate derivative of cordycepin (3'-deoxyadenosine), a chemical compound originally isolated from the fungus Cordyceps militaris. As a nucleoside analog with potential antineoplastic properties, Fosdesdenosine sipalabenamide is designed to inhibit RNA synthesis and act as an RNA inhibitor. The drug is being developed by NuCana Plc.
