= C10H13N5O3 =

The molecular formula C_{10}H_{13}N_{5}O_{3} (molar mass: 251.246 g/mol, exact mass: 251.1018 u) may refer to:

- Cordycepin
- Deoxyadenosine
