= Palgwa-tang =

Korean turtle soup

Palgwatang is a soup boiled with turtle's head and legs. Terrapin can be used as a substitute.

It is similar to China's Palgwaetang(八卦湯). Palgwatang contains ginger, tree ear, ginkgo nut, Cordyceps militaris, ginseng, chest nut, shiitake mushroom and jujube.

== Efficacy and side effect ==
There are claims that the soup is effective for people who are easily tired and heavy. Supposedly people with acute illnesses such as colds should avoid this dish.
