= Pentostatin =

Chemical compound

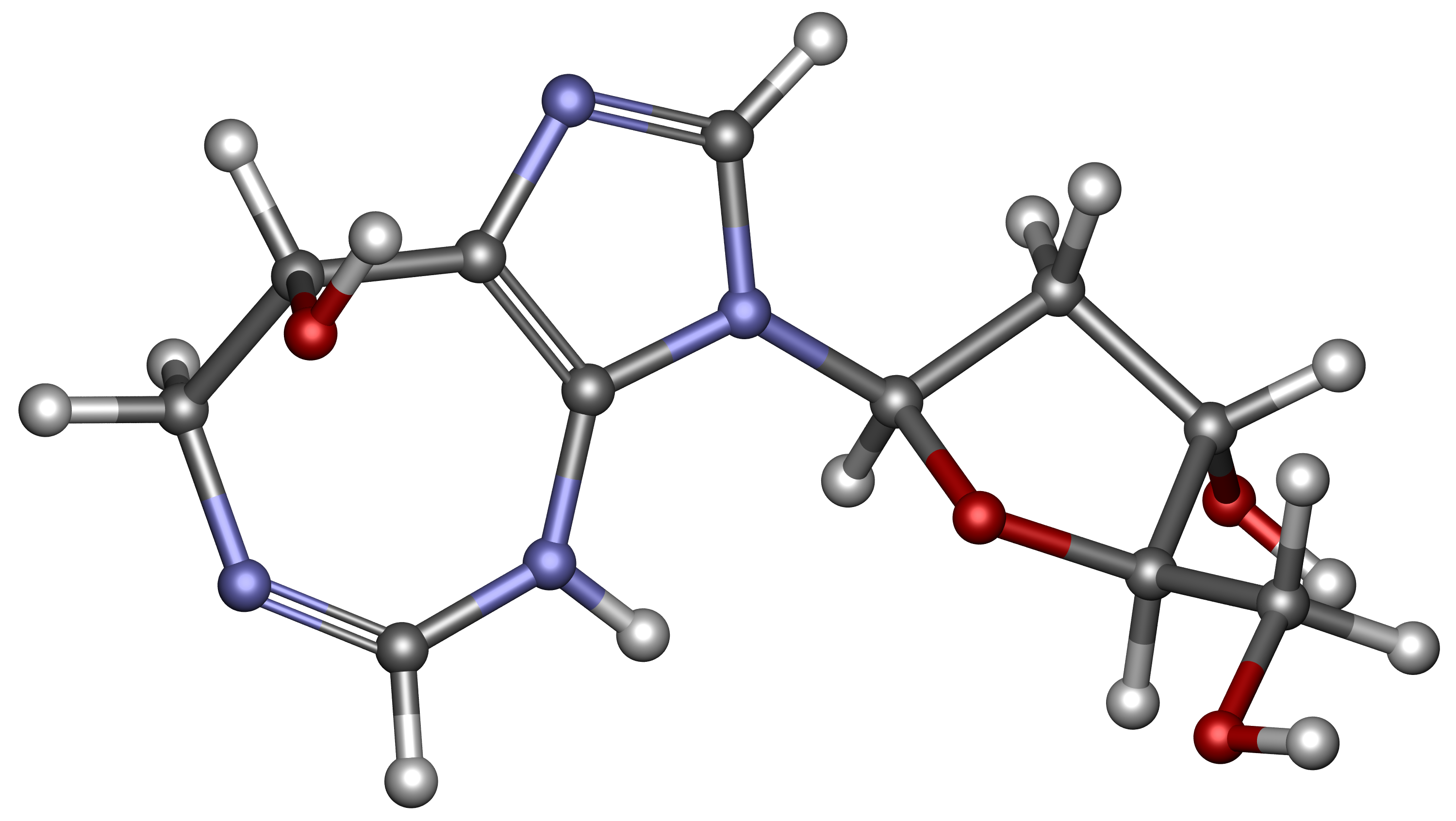

Clinical data
- Trade names: Nipent
- AHFS/Drugs.com: Monograph
- MedlinePlus: a692004
- Routes of administration: Intravenous
- ATC code: L01XX08 (WHO)

Legal status
- Legal status: CA: ℞-only; UK: POM (Prescription only); US: ℞-only

Pharmacokinetic data
- Bioavailability: n/a
- Protein binding: 4%
- Metabolism: Hepatic, minor
- Elimination half-life: 2.6 to 16 hours, mean 5.7 hours

Identifiers
- IUPAC name: (R)-3-((2R,4S,5R)-4-hydroxy-5-(hydroxymethyl)tetrahydrofuran-2-yl)-3,6,7,8-tetrahydroimidazo[4,5-d][1,3]diazepin-8-ol
- CAS Number: 53910-25-1
- PubChem CID: 439693
- IUPHAR/BPS: 4805
- DrugBank: DB00552
- ChemSpider: 388759
- UNII: 395575MZO7
- KEGG: D00155
- ChEBI: CHEBI:27834
- ChEMBL: ChEMBL1580
- CompTox Dashboard (EPA): DTXSID2023436
- ECHA InfoCard: 100.164.991

Chemical and physical data
- Formula: C_{11}H_{16}N_{4}O_{4}
- Molar mass: 268.273 g·mol^{−1}
- 3D model (JSmol): Interactive image
- SMILES: n1c3c(n(c1)[C@@H]2O[C@@H]([C@@H](O)C2)CO)N\C=N/C[C@H]3O
- InChI: InChI=1S/C11H16N4O4/c16-3-8-6(17)1-9(19-8)15-5-14-10-7(18)2-12-4-13-11(10)15/h4-9,16-18H,1-3H2,(H,12,13)/t6-,7+,8+,9+/m0/s1; Key:FPVKHBSQESCIEP-JQCXWYLXSA-N

Pentostatin (or 2′-deoxycoformycin, trade name Nipent, manufactured by SuperGen) is an anticancer chemotherapeutic drug.

== Medical uses ==
Pentostatin is used to treat hairy cell leukemia. It is given by intravenous infusion once every two weeks for three to six months.

Additionally, pentostatin has been used to treat steroid-refractory acute and chronic graft-versus-host disease.

Pentostatin is also used in chronic lymphocytic leukemia (CLL) patients who have relapsed.

== Mechanism of action ==
Pentostatin is classified as a purine analog, which is a type of antimetabolite. It mimics adenosine, a nucleoside, and inhibits the enzyme adenosine deaminase, interfering with the cell's ability to process DNA.

Cancer cells generally divide more rapidly than healthy cells; DNA replicates during mitosis, and drugs that target DNA-related processes are therefore more often more toxic to cancer cells than healthy cells.

== Production ==
Pentostatin was originally made by Streptomyces antibioticus fermentation. Current production likely uses chemical synthesis.

=== Fermentation ===
Pentostatin was originally discovered in a fermentation broth of Streptomyces antibioticus in 1977, when labor-intensive purification of 9500 liters of fermentation broth ("beer") yields 8 grams of the crystalline substance. A "practical process" published in 1992 greatly simplified the purification method of Streptomyces broth, making it somewhat economical to produce despite the low concentration found in the broth. The paper seems to imply that the labor-intensive purification method was used to supply all pentostatin used for clinical trials required for the FDA approval in 1991. Another bacterium capable of producing pentostatin is Actinomadura sp., which is also capable of synthesizing a 2'-chloropentostatin.

Another line of process improvement came from the discovery that the cordycepin producer Aspergillus nidulans Y176-2 also produces pentostatin, which was reported in a 1976 Japanese patent and a 1979 Japanese paper. It is, however, unclear whether the patent was put into practice.

=== Total synthesis ===
The structure of natural products is often confirmed by total synthesis. Such a synthesis would not initially be economical, but provides good assurance that the product is indeed of the intended structure. If the product then proves identical to the natural isolate, the proposed structure for the natural product is considered confirmed. Total synthesis was originally achieved in 1979, with many improvements published thereafter. Based on the recency of some of these patents, it may be fair to assume that they are indeed in use.

Total synthesis of Pentostatin

== Natural occurrence ==
Pentostatin is produced by:

- Streptomyces antibioticus NRRL 3238, which also produces vidarabine using the same gene cluster. The gene cluster encodes completely separate pathways for vidarabine and pentostatin synthesis with no genes shared between them. Inside of the bacterium, pentostatin protects vidarabine from being destroyed by the adenosine deaminase, a kind of "protector-protégé" strategy.
- Cordyceps militaris and Cordyceps kyusyuensis, both of which also produces cordycepin using the same gene cluster. Here pentostatin protects cordycepin from deamination. The pathways are not as cleanly separated as in Streptomyces: of the four proteins encoded by the cluster, one (Cns3) is shared for both pathways, though this is mostly because Cns3 is a bifunctional protein with two catalytic domains.
- Aspergillus nidulans Y176-2, which also produces cordycepin. Pentostatin probably also serves to protect cordycepin here. The biosynthetic gene cluster is fully syntenic with the Cordyceps version.
- Probably Samsoniella hepiali, which is known to produce cordycepin. Cordycepin production is known to be coupled with pentostatin production.

=== Natural analogues ===
- Actinomadura sp. ATCC 39365 produces 2′-chloropentostatin to protect 2′-amino-2′-deoxyadenosine.
