= Adenine =

Chemical compound in DNA and RNA

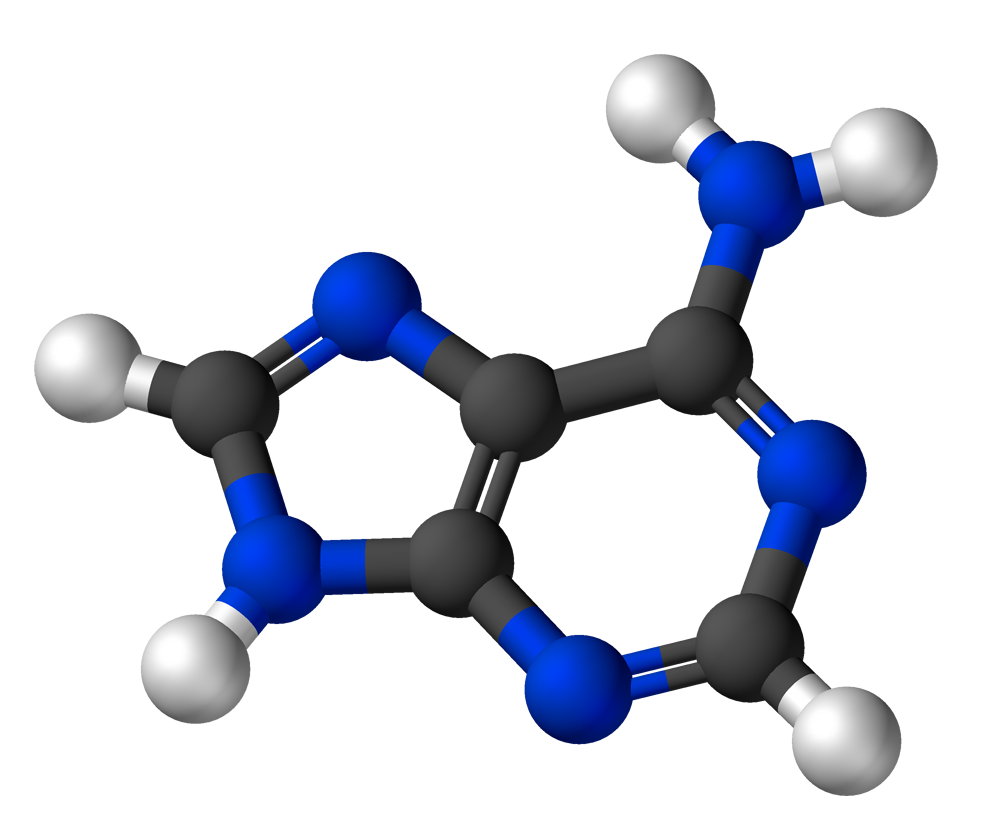

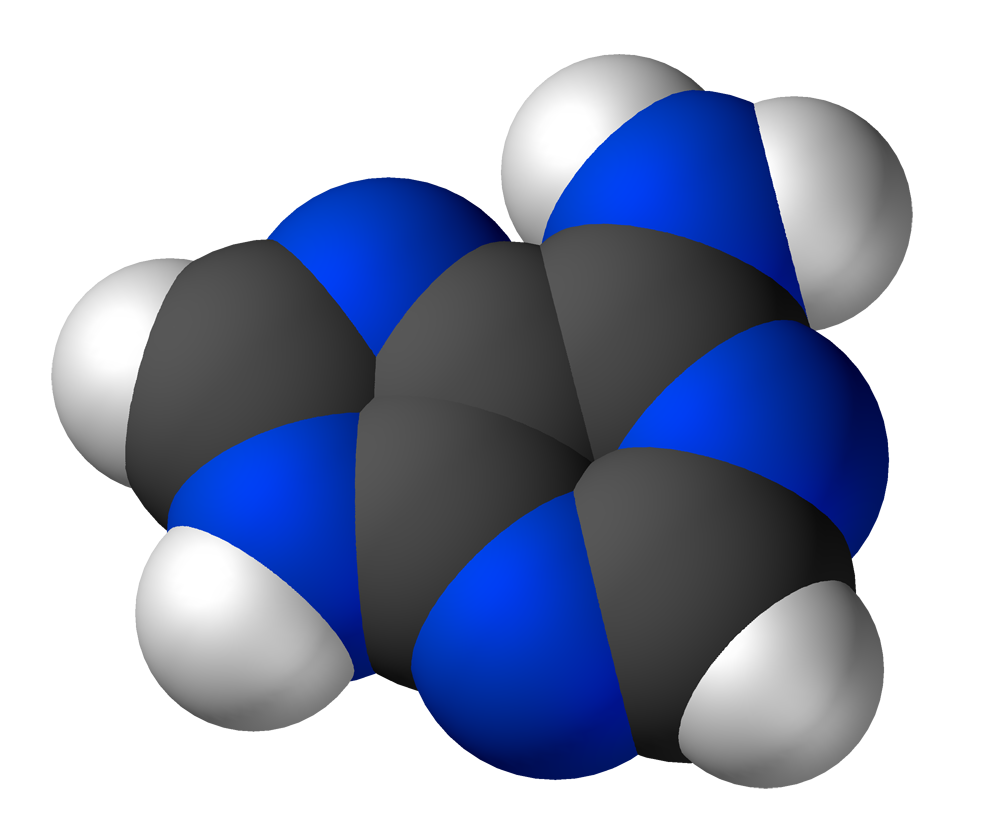

Names
- Preferred IUPAC name 9H-Purin-6-amine
- Other names 6-Aminopurine

Identifiers
CAS Number	73-24-5
3D model (JSmol)	Interactive image; Interactive image
Beilstein Reference	608603
ChEBI	CHEBI:16708
ChEMBL	ChEMBL226345
ChemSpider	185
DrugBank	DB00173
ECHA InfoCard	100.000.724
EC Number	200-796-1
Gmelin Reference	3903
IUPHAR/BPS	4788
KEGG	D00034
PubChem CID	190
RTECS number	AU6125000
UNII	JAC85A2161
CompTox Dashboard (EPA)	DTXSID6022557
- InChI: InChI=1S/C5H5N5/c6-4-3-5(9-1-7-3)10-2-8-4/h1-2H,(H3,6,7,8,9,10) Key: GFFGJBXGBJISGV-UHFFFAOYSA-N; InChI=1/C5H5N5/c6-4-3-5(9-1-7-3)10-2-8-4/h1-2H,(H3,6,7,8,9,10) Key: GFFGJBXGBJISGV-UHFFFAOYAT
- SMILES: NC1=NC=NC2=C1N=CN2; Nc1c2ncNc2ncn1

Properties
Chemical formula	C_{5}H_{5}N_{5}
Molar mass	135.130 g·mol^{−1}
Appearance	white to light yellow, crystalline
Density	1.6 g/cm^{3} (calculated)
Melting point	360 to 365 °C (680 to 689 °F; 633 to 638 K) decomposes
Solubility in water	0.103 g/100 mL
Solubility	negligible in ethanol, soluble in hot water and/or aqua ammonia
Acidity (pK_{a})	4.15 (secondary), 9.80 (primary)

Thermochemistry
Heat capacity (C)	147.0 J/(K·mol)
Std enthalpy of formation (Δ_{f}H^{⦵}_{298})	96.9 kJ/mol

Hazards
- Lethal dose or concentration (LD, LC)
LD_{50} (median dose)	227 mg/kg (rat, oral)
Safety data sheet (SDS)	MSDS
- Except where otherwise noted, data are given for materials in their standard state (at 25 °C [77 °F], 100 kPa). verify (what is ?) Infobox references

Adenine (Note: /ˈædɪniːn/, /ˈædɪnɪn/) (symbol A, or Ade) is a purine nucleotide base that is found in DNA, RNA, and ATP. It is usually a white crystalline substance. The shape of adenine is complementary and pairs to either thymine in DNA or uracil in RNA. In cells, adenine is rare as an independent molecule. It is almost always covalently bound to become a part of a larger biomolecule.

Adenine has a central role in cellular respiration. It is part of adenosine triphosphate which provides the energy that drives and supports most activities in living cells, such as protein synthesis, muscle contraction, and nerve impulse propagation. In respiration it also participates as part of the cofactors nicotinamide adenine dinucleotide, flavin adenine dinucleotide, and coenzyme A.

It is also part of adenosine, adenosine monophosphate, cyclic adenosine monophosphate, adenosine diphosphate, and S-adenosylmethionine.

== Structure ==
Adenine forms several tautomers, compounds that can be rapidly interconverted and are often considered equivalent. However, in isolated conditions, i.e. in an inert gas matrix and in the gas phase, mainly the 9H-adenine tautomer is found.

== Biosynthesis ==
Purine metabolism involves the formation of adenine and guanine. Both adenine and guanine are derived from the nucleotide inosine monophosphate (IMP), which in turn is synthesized from a pre-existing ribose phosphate through a complex pathway using atoms from the amino acids glycine, glutamine, and aspartic acid, as well as the coenzyme tetrahydrofolate.

Patented August 20, 1968, the current recognized method of industrial-scale production of adenine involves heating formamide at 120 to 150 °C.

== Function ==
Adenine is one of the two purine nucleobases (the other being guanine) used in forming nucleotides of the nucleic acids. In DNA, adenine binds to thymine via two hydrogen bonds to assist in stabilizing the nucleic acid structures. In RNA, which is used for protein synthesis, adenine binds to uracil.

A-T-Base-pair (DNA)	A-U-Base-pair (RNA)	A-D-Base-pair (RNA)	A-Ψ-Base-pair (RNA)

Adenine forms adenosine, a nucleoside, when attached to ribose, and deoxyadenosine when attached to deoxyribose. It forms adenosine triphosphate (ATP), a nucleoside triphosphate, when three phosphate groups are added to adenosine. Adenosine triphosphate is used in cellular metabolism as one of the basic methods of transferring chemical energy between chemical reactions. ATP is thus a derivative of adenine, adenosine, cyclic adenosine monophosphate, and adenosine diphosphate.

Adenosine, A	Deoxyadenosine, dA

== History ==
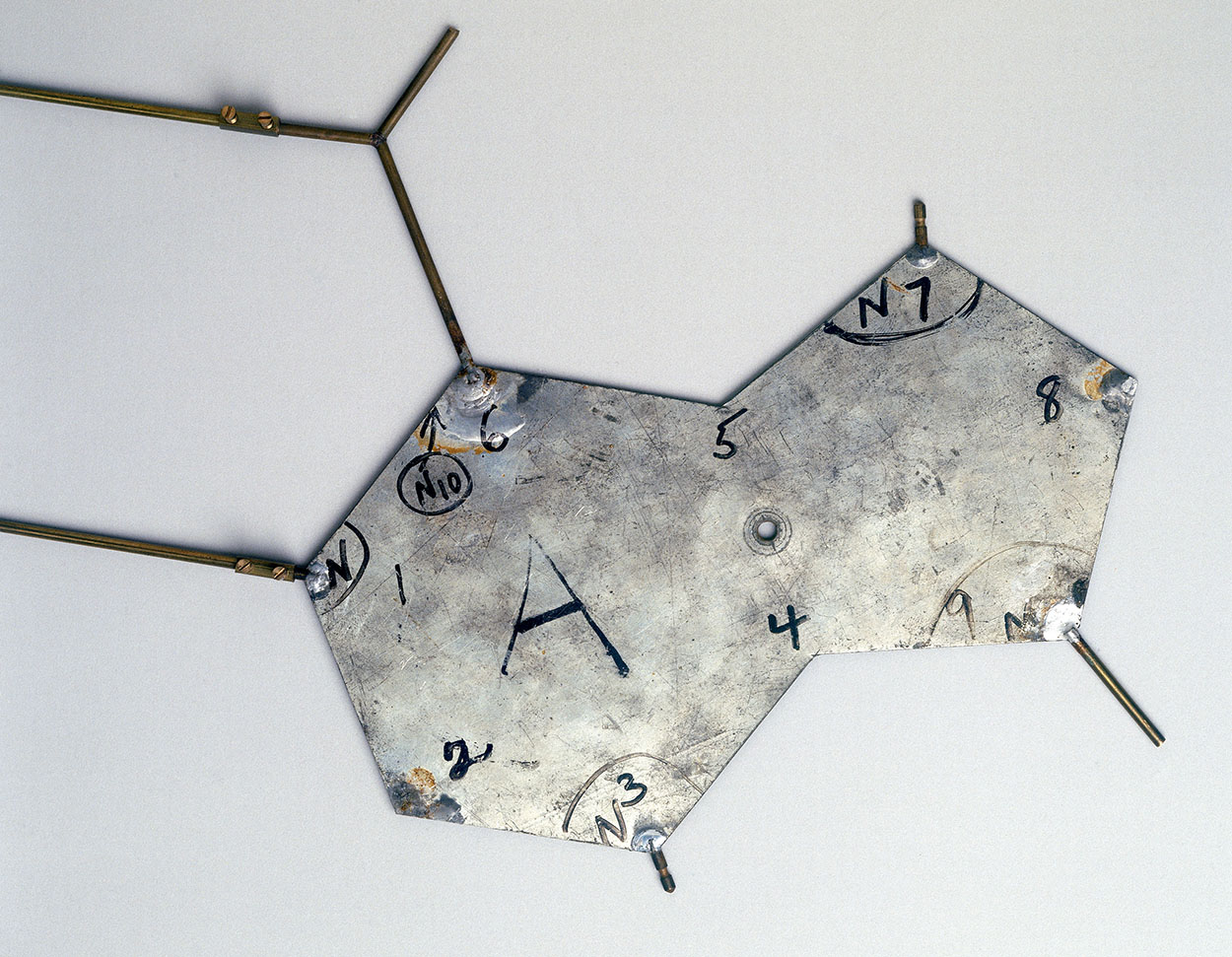
Adenine on Crick and Watson's DNA molecular model, 1953. The picture is mirrored left-to-right compared to most modern drawings of adenine, such as those used in this article.

In older literature, adenine was sometimes called Vitamin B_{4}, but is no longer considered a vitamin. Due to it being synthesized by the body and not essential to be obtained by diet, it does not meet the definition of vitamin and is no longer part of the Vitamin B complex. However, two B vitamins, niacin and riboflavin, bind with adenine to form the essential cofactors nicotinamide adenine dinucleotide (NAD) and flavin adenine dinucleotide (FAD), respectively. Hermann Emil Fischer was one of the early scientists to study adenine.

It was named in 1885 by Albrecht Kossel after Greek ἀδήν aden "gland", in reference to the pancreas, from which Kossel's sample had been extracted.

Adenine can be prepared from ammonia and hydrogen cyanide (HCN) in aqueous solution, a process that has implications for the origin of life on Earth.

On August 8, 2011, a report, based on NASA studies with meteorites found on Earth, was published suggesting building blocks of DNA and RNA (adenine, guanine and related organic molecules) may have been formed extraterrestrially in outer space. In 2011, physicists reported that adenine has an "unexpectedly variable range of ionization energies along its reaction pathways" which suggested that "understanding experimental data on how adenine survives exposure to UV light is much more complicated than previously thought"; these findings have implications for spectroscopic measurements of heterocyclic compounds, according to one report.
