= 5'-deoxyadenosine deaminase =

Class of enzymes

Identifiers
- EC no.: 3.5.4.41

Databases
- BRENDA: enzyme data
- ExPASy: NiceZyme view
- KEGG: enzyme entry
- MetaCyc: metabolic pathway
- Rhea: reactions
- PDB structures: RCSB PDB PDBe PDBsum
Search
- PMC: articles
- PubMed: articles
- NCBI: proteins

5'-deoxyadenosine deaminase (also known as "DadD") is an enzyme that catalyzes the conversion of 5′-deoxyadenosine to 5′-deoxyinosine. To a lesser extent, the enzyme also catalyzes the deamination of 5′-methylthioadenosine, S-adenosylhomocysteine, and adenosine. The molecular mass of the DadD enzyme is approximately 230 kDa. DadD maintains 90% of its enzymatic activity after being heated at 60 degrees Celsius for ten minutes. The preferred pH for 5'deoxyadenosine deaminase is 9.0, with the enzyme denaturing at a pH of 11. The DadD enzyme has a preferred substrate of 5'deoxyadenosine, though it will also react with 5′-methylthioadenosine, S-adenosylhomocysteine, and adenosine at lower efficiencies.

== Enzyme identification ==
The EC number of 5'-deoxyadenosine deaminase is EC:3.5.4.41. The Enzyme Commission Number is a system of classifying enzymes based on the reactions that the enzyme catalyzes. Due to EC number not being attached to specific enzymes, but rather the enzyme catalyzed reaction, a single EC number could describe a variety of enzymes that catalyze the same reaction. The UniProt id number for 5'-deoxyadenosine deaminase is Q58936. This number is specific to the enzyme itself, not just the reaction it catalyzes.

== Reaction pathway ==
5'-deoxyadenosine deaminase catalyses the salvage pathway of 5'-deoxyadenosine by converting it to 5'-deoxyinosine and ammonia:

5'-deoxyadenosine
H_{2}O
NH_{3}
5'-deoxyinosine

== Structure ==
The enzyme has many active sites, with some of them specifically being metal binding sites that interact with zinc. The metal binding sites are located at positions 55, 57, 203, and 292. Additional binding sites include positions 84, 176, 206, and 292. The solved crystal structure of 5'-deoxyadenosine deaminase can be found in the SMR database here.

== Variation across species ==
The DadD enzyme is unique in that it has only been discovered in a single organism; a thermophilic methanogenic archaean named Methanocaldococcus jannaschii. In methanogens such as Methanocaldococcus jannaschii, the typical metabolism pathway of salvaging radical SAM reaction products cannot be used, due to a lack of the enzyme MTA/SAH nucleosidase (EC 3.2.2.9). Salvaging radical SAM reaction products is important for methanogens. Without a salvage pathway, 5'-deoxyadenosine would build up, and inhibit the processes of biotin synthase (BioB) and lipoyl synthase (LipA). The DadD enzyme offers a mechanism for methanogens to salvage these SAM reaction products without the use of MTA/SAH nucleosidase.
