= Samsoniella =

Scientific classification
- Kingdom: Fungi
- Division: Ascomycota
- Class: Sordariomycetes
- Order: Hypocreales
- Family: Cordycipitaceae
- Genus: Samsoniella; Mongkols., Noisrip., Thanakitp., Spatafora & Luangsa-ard, 2018

Genus of fungi

Samsoniella is a genus of fungi belonging to the family Cordycipitaceae.

It contains the economically-important Samsoniella hepiali, which has a medicine and health food market worth 10 billion RMB in China.

== Species ==
GBIF list from March 2023:

- Samsoniella alboaurantia (G.Sm.) Mongkols., Noisrip., Thanakitp., Spatafora & Luangsa-ard
- Samsoniella alpina H.Yu, Y.B.Wang, Y.Wang & Zhu L.Yang
- Samsoniella antleroides H.Yu, Y.B.Wang, Y.Wang, Q.Fan & Zhu L.Yang
- Samsoniella aurantia Mongkols., Noisrip., Thanakitp., Spatafora & Luangsa-ard
- Samsoniella cardinalis H.Yu, Y.B.Wang, Y.Wang, Q.Fan & Zhu L.Yang
- Samsoniella coccinellidicola Hong Yu bis, Yao Wang & Z.Q.Wang
- Samsoniella coleopterorum W.H.Chen, Y.F.Han & Z.Q.Liang
- Samsoniella cristata H.Yu, Y.B.Wang, Y.Wang, Q.Fan & Zhu L.Yang
- Samsoniella erucae W.H.Chen, Y.F.Han, J.D.Liang & Z.Q.Liang
- Samsoniella farinospora Hong Yu bis, Yao Wang & Z.Q.Wang
- Samsoniella formicae W.H.Chen, Y.F.Han, J.D.Liang & Z.Q.Liang
- Samsoniella guizhouensis W.H.Chen, Y.F.Han, J.D.Liang & Z.Q.Liang
- Samsoniella haniana Hong Yu bis, Yao Wang & Z.Q.Wang
- Samsoniella hepiali (Q.T.Chen & R.Q.Dai ex R.Q.Dai, X.M.Li, A.J.Shao, Shu F.Lin, J.L.Lan, Wei H.Chen & C.Y.Shen) H.Yu, R.Q.Dai, Y.B.Wang, Y.Wang & Zhu L.Yang
- Samsoniella hymenopterorum W.H.Chen, Y.F.Han & Z.Q.Liang
- Samsoniella inthanonensis Mongkols., Noisrip., Thanakitp., Spatafora & Luangsa-ard
- Samsoniella kunmingensis H.Yu, Y.B.Wang, Y.Wang, Q.Fan & Zhu L.Yang
- Samsoniella lanmaoa H.Yu, Y.B.Wang, Y.Wang, Q.Fan & Zhu L.Yang
- Samsoniella lepidopterorum W.H.Chen, Y.F.Han & Z.Q.Liang
- Samsoniella neopupicola W.H.Chen, Y.F.Han, J.D.Liang & Z.Q.Liang
- Samsoniella pseudogunnii W.H.Chen, Y.F.Han, J.D.Liang & Z.Q.Liang
- Samsoniella pseudotortricidae Hong Yu bis, Yao Wang & Z.Q.Wang
- Samsoniella pupicola W.H.Chen, Y.F.Han, J.D.Liang & Z.Q.Liang
- Samsoniella ramosa H.Yu, Y.B.Wang, Y.Wang, Q.Fan & Zhu L.Yang
- Samsoniella sinensis Hong Yu bis, Yao Wang & Z.Q.Wang
- Samsoniella tiankengensis W.H.Chen, Y.F.Han, J.D.Liang & Z.Q.Liang
- Samsoniella tortricidae H.Yu, Y.B.Wang, Y.Wang, Q.Fan & Zhu L.Yang
- Samsoniella yunnanensis H.Yu, Y.B.Wang, Y.Wang, D.E.Duan & Zhu L.Yang
