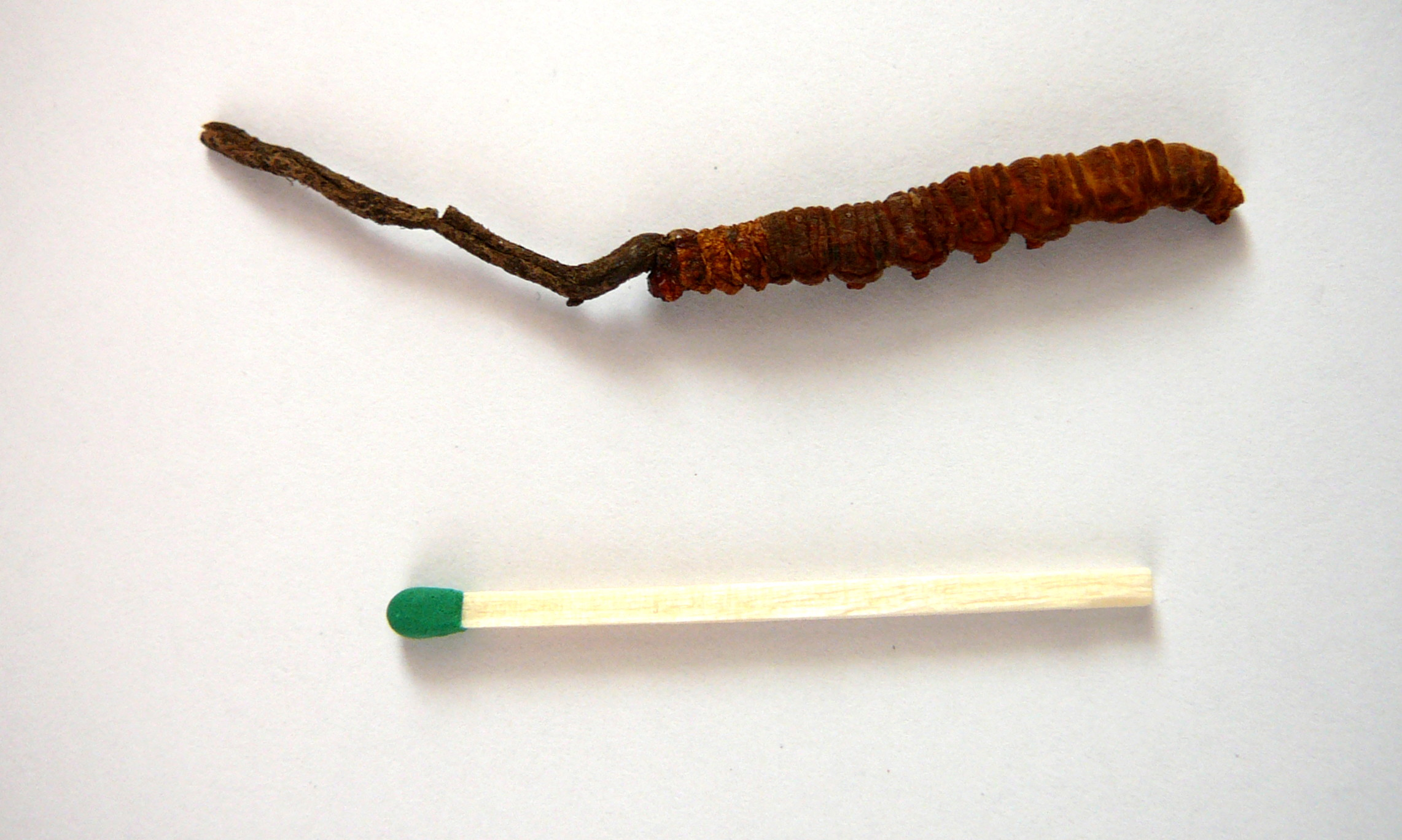
- Ophiocordyceps sinensis (left) growing out of the head of a dead caterpillar

Conservation status
- Vulnerable (IUCN 3.1)

Scientific classification
- Kingdom: Fungi
- Division: Ascomycota
- Class: Sordariomycetes
- Order: Hypocreales
- Family: Ophiocordycipitaceae
- Genus: Ophiocordyceps
- Species: O. sinensis

Binomial name
- Ophiocordyceps sinensis (Berk.) G.H.Sung, J.M.Sung, Hywel-Jones & Spatafora (2007)

Synonyms
- Sphaeria sinensis Berk. (1843); Cordyceps sinensis (Berk.) Sacc. (1878)

= Ophiocordyceps sinensis =

Species of fungus

Ophiocordyceps sinensis

Chinese name
- Traditional Chinese: 冬蟲夏草
- Simplified Chinese: 冬虫夏草
- Literal meaning: winter worm, summer grass
Transcriptions
Standard Mandarin
- Hanyu Pinyin: dōng chóng xià cǎo

Alternative Chinese name
- Traditional Chinese: 蟲草
- Simplified Chinese: 虫草
- Literal meaning: worm-grass
Transcriptions
Standard Mandarin
- Hanyu Pinyin: chóngcǎo

Burmese name
- Burmese: ရှီးပတီး

Tibetan name
- Tibetan: དབྱར་རྩྭ་དགུན་འབུ་
Transcriptions
- Wylie: Dbyar Rtswa Dgun'bu
- Tibetan Pinyin: Yarza Günbu

Vietnamese name
- Vietnamese: = Đông trùng hạ thảo

Nepali name
- Nepali: यार्सागुम्बा

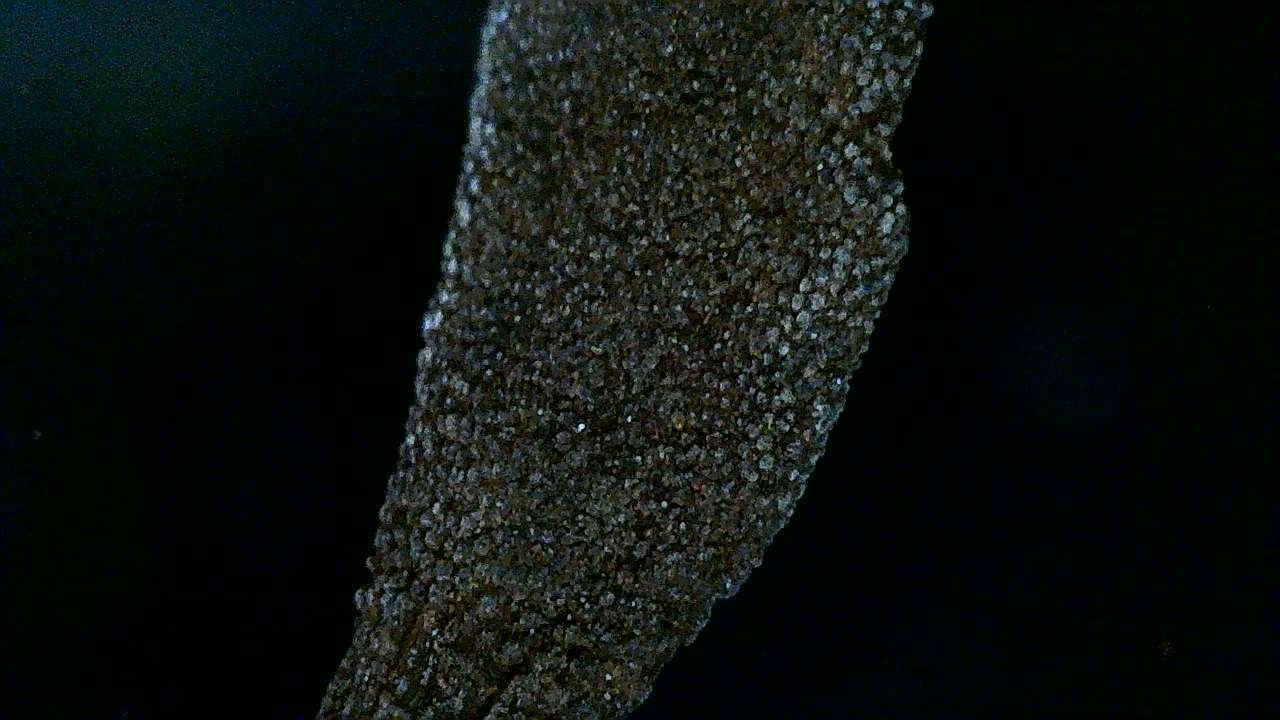
Microscopic detail of the fruiting body

Ophiocordyceps sinensis, formerly Cordyceps sinensis and colloquially known as caterpillar fungus, is an insect-pathogenic fungus in the family Ophiocordycipitaceae. It is primarily found in high-altitude regions of the Tibetan Plateau. It parasitizes larvae of ghost moths and produces a fruiting body which is valued in traditional Chinese medicine and Nepalese medicine as an aphrodisiac. However, naturally harvested fruiting bodies often contain high amounts of arsenic and other heavy metals, making them potentially toxic. As a result, their sale has been strictly regulated by China's State Administration for Market Regulation since 2016.

O. sinensis parasitizes the larvae of moths within the family Hepialidae, specifically genera found on the Tibetan Plateau and in the Himalayas between elevations of 3,000–5,000 m (9,800–16,400 ft). found across Tibet, the Himalayan regions of India, Bhutan and Nepal, and several Chinese provinces (Qinghai, Sichuan, and Yunnan). The fungus germinates in the living larva, kills and mummifies it, and a fruiting body emerges from the corpse as an upright stalk.

O. sinensis is classified as a medicinal mushroom, and its use has a long history in traditional Chinese medicine as well as in traditional Tibetan medicine. It is marketed for various health benefits but lacks sufficient scientific evidence for safety or effectiveness, and quality can vary due to inconsistent processing and labeling. The hand-collected, intact fungus-caterpillar body is valued by herbalists as medicine, and because of its cost, its use is also a status symbol.

The fruiting bodies of the fungus are not cultivated commercially outside of China, but the mycelium form can be cultivated in vitro. Overharvesting and overexploitation have led to the classification of O. sinensis as an endangered species in China. Additional research needs to be carried out in order to understand its morphology and growth habits for conservation and optimum utilization.

== Taxonomic history and systematics ==
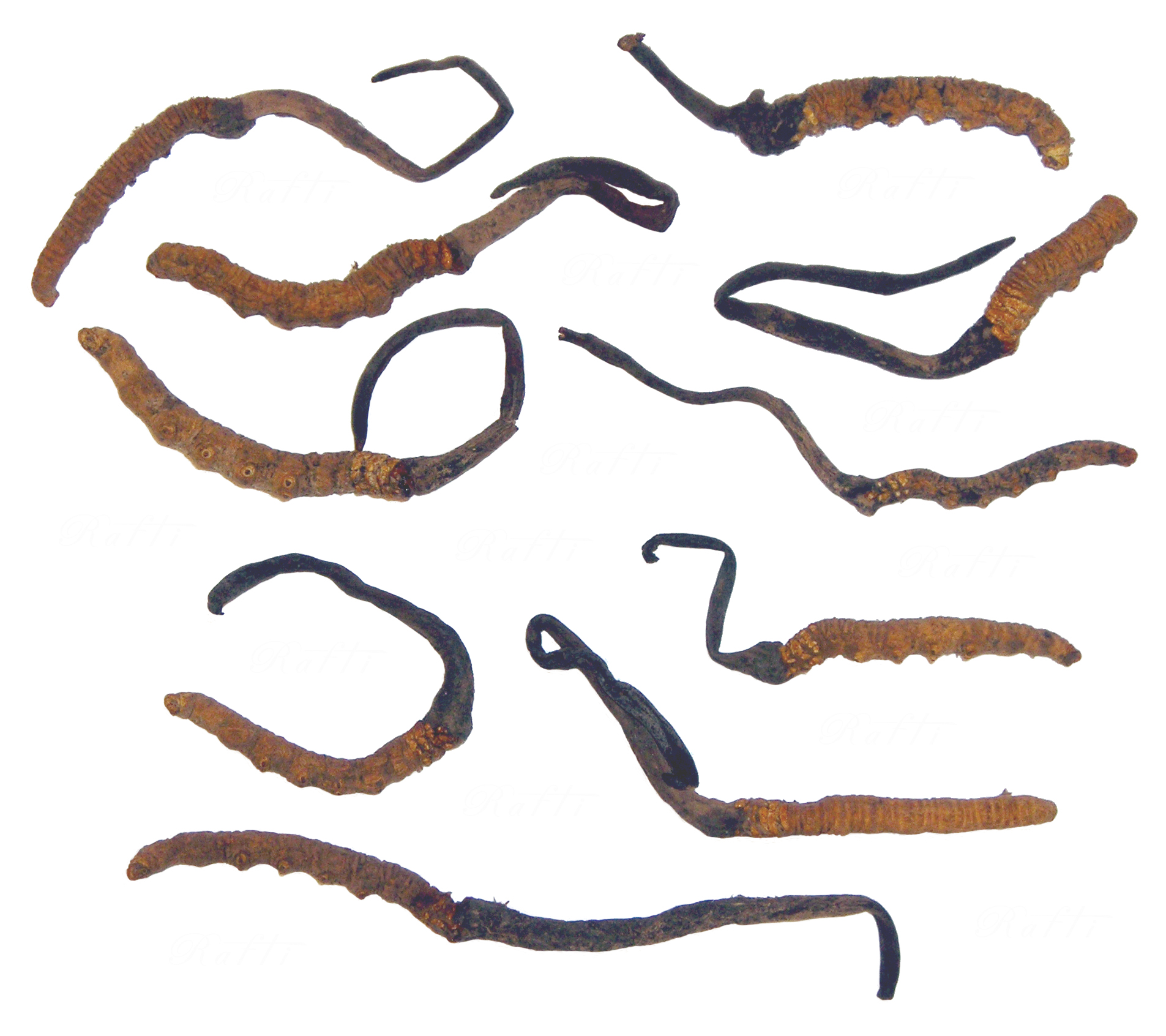
Caterpillars with emerging Ophiocordyceps sinensis

=== Morphological features ===
Ophiocordyceps sinensis consists of two parts, a fungal endosclerotium (within the caterpillar) and stroma. The stroma varies from dark brown or black, but can be a yellow color when fresh, and longer than the caterpillar itself, usually 4–10 cm. It grows singly from the larval head, and is clavate, sublanceolate or fusiform, and distinct from the stipe (stalk). The stipe is slender, glabrous, and longitudinally furrowed or ridged.

The fertile part of the stroma is the head. The head is granular because of the ostioles of the embedded perithecia. The perithecia are ordinally arranged and ovoid. The asci are cylindrical or slightly tapering at both ends, and may be straight or curved, with a capitate and hemispheroid apex, and may be two to four spored. Similarly, ascospores are hyaline, filiform, multiseptate at a length of 5–12 μm and subattenuated on both sides. Perithecial, ascus and ascospore characters in the fruiting bodies are the key identification characteristics of O. sinensis.

Ophiocordyceps species produce whole ascospores and do not separate into part spores. This is different from other Cordyceps species, which produce either immersed or superficial perithecia perpendicular to stromal surface, and the ascospores at maturity are disarticulated into part spores. Generally, Cordyceps species possess brightly colored and fleshy stromata, but O. sinensis has dark pigments and tough to pliant stromata, a typical characteristic feature of most of the Ophiocordyceps species.

=== Developments in classification ===
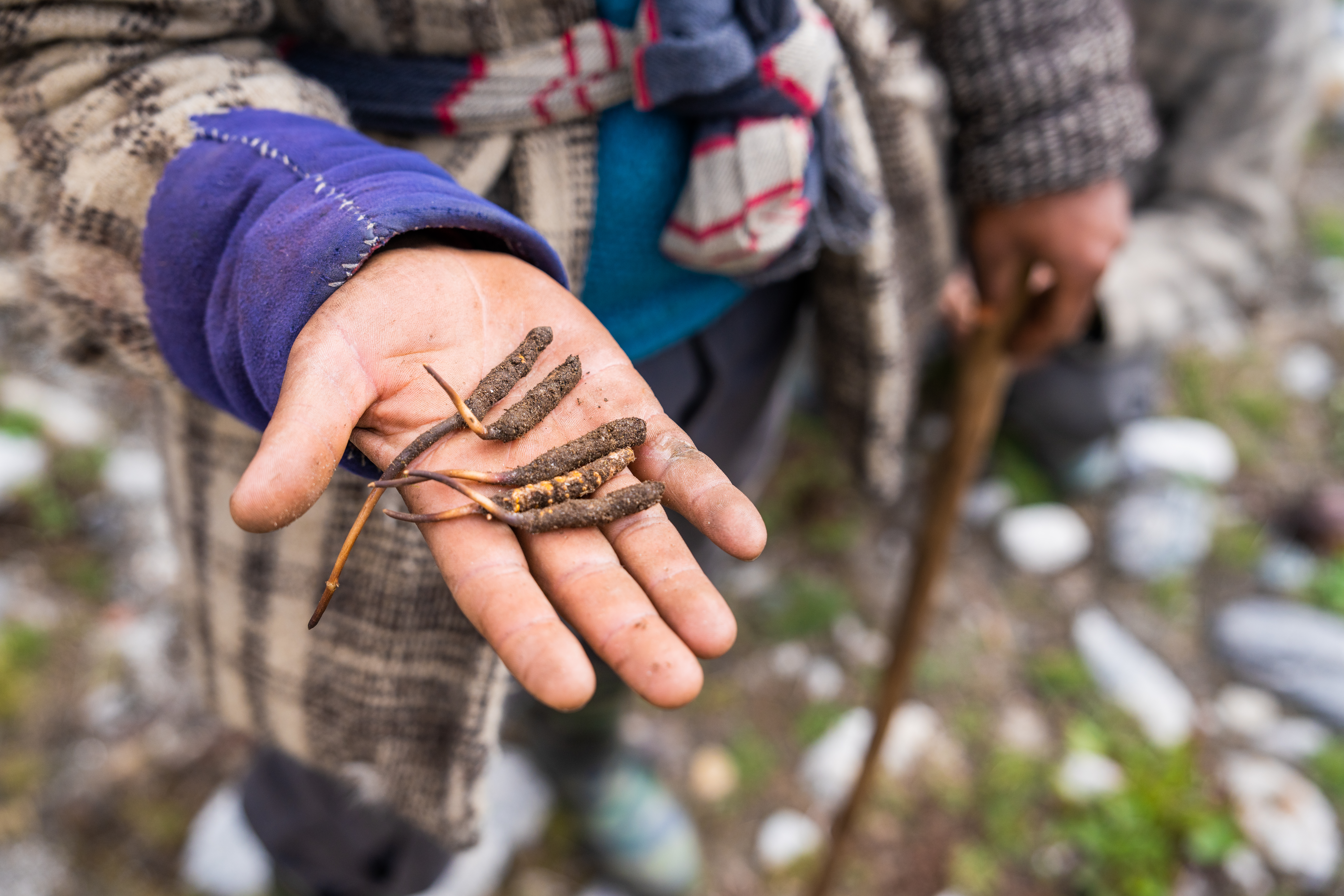
Ophiocordyceps sinensis after being harvested (Darchula, Nepal).

The species was first described scientifically by Miles Berkeley in 1843 as Sphaeria sinensis. The species was later reclassified Cordyceps in 1878 by Pier Andrea Saccardo. The fungus was known as Cordyceps sinensis until 2007, when molecular analytical techniques were used to amend the classification of Cordycipitaceae and Clavicipitaceae, resulting in the naming of a new family Ophiocordycipitaceae and the reclassification of several Cordyceps species, including C. sinensis, to the genus Ophiocordyceps.

=== Common names ===
In Tibet, it is known as yartsa gunbu, དབྱར་རྩྭ་དགུན་འབུ་ (Wylie: dbyar rtswa dgun 'bu, ZWPY: yarza g̈unbu, Lhasa dialect: [jɑ̀ːt͡sɑ kỹ̀pu], "summer grass winter worm"). The name was first recorded in the 15th century by the Tibetan doctor Zurkhar Namnyi Dorje. In colloquial Tibetan, yartsa gunbu is often shortened to "yartsa" or "bu". The Tibetan name is transliterated in Nepali as यार्चागुन्बू, यार्चागुन्बा, yarshagumba, yarchagumba or yarsagumba. The transliteration in Bhutan is yartsa guenboob.

In India, it is known as keera jhar, keeda jadi, keeda ghas or ghaas fafoond in Nepali, Hindi and Garhwali.

It is known in Chinese as dōng chóng xià cǎo (冬蟲夏草), meaning "winter worm, summer grass", which is a literal translation of the original Tibetan name. In traditional Chinese medicine, its name is often abbreviated as chong cao (蟲草 "insect plant"), a name that also applies to other Cordyceps species, such as C. militaris. In Japanese, it is homophonically read as tōchūkasō (冬虫夏草), while in Korean and Vietnamese it is known by the transliterated forms of the Chinese word, dongchunghacho (동충하초) and đông trùng hạ thảo respectively. Some Chinese English-language texts refer to Cordyceps sinensis as āweto, which is the Māori name for Ophiocordyceps robertsii, a species from south-eastern Australia and New Zealand.

The English term "vegetable caterpillar" is a misnomer, as no plant is involved. "Caterpillar fungus" is a preferred term.

=== Synonyms ===
Since the 1980s, 22 species in 13 genera have been attributed to the anamorph (asexually reproducing mold-like form) of O. sinensis.

Anamorphs attributed to O. sinensis
| Anamorph | Correct Teleomorph | Method for identification/Reference |
|---|---|---|
| Cephalosporium acreomonium | Umbelopsis | |
| Chrysosporium sinense | ? (not O. sinensis) | RAPD polymorphism similarity |
| Cephalosporium dongchongxiacae (invalid name) | O. sinensis | |
| Cephalosporium sp. sensu (incomplete name) | O. sinensis | |
| Hirsutella sinensis (invalid name but commonly used) | O. sinensis | ; ITS sequence; microcyclic conidiation from ascospores and molecular studies |
| Hirsutella hepiali | O. sinensis | |
| Cephalosporium sinensis | Possibly O. sinensis | there is lack of valid information |
| Isaria farinosa | Paecilomyces farinosus | |
| Isolates reported as Isaria sp., Verticella sp., Scydalium sp. | Unknown, identification is dubious | |
| Mortierella hepiali | Unknown Zygomycota | |
| Paecilomyces sinensis | ? (not O. sinensis) | molecular evidence |
| Sporothrix insectorum | ? (not O. sinensis) | molecular evidence |
| Paecilomyces lingi | ? | incomplete information, only appeared in one article |
| Tolypocladium sinense | ? | no valid information as of 2002 |
| Paecilomyces hepiali | ? | Confirmed to be its own species, now Samsoniella hepiali |
| Tolypocladium sinense | ? | no valid information as of 2002 |

Additional synonyms for the teleomorph are Cordyceps nepalensis and C. multiaxialis. They have similar morphological characteristics to O. sinensis, also had almost identical or identical ITS sequences and its presumed anamorph, H. sinensis.

== Ecology and life cycle ==
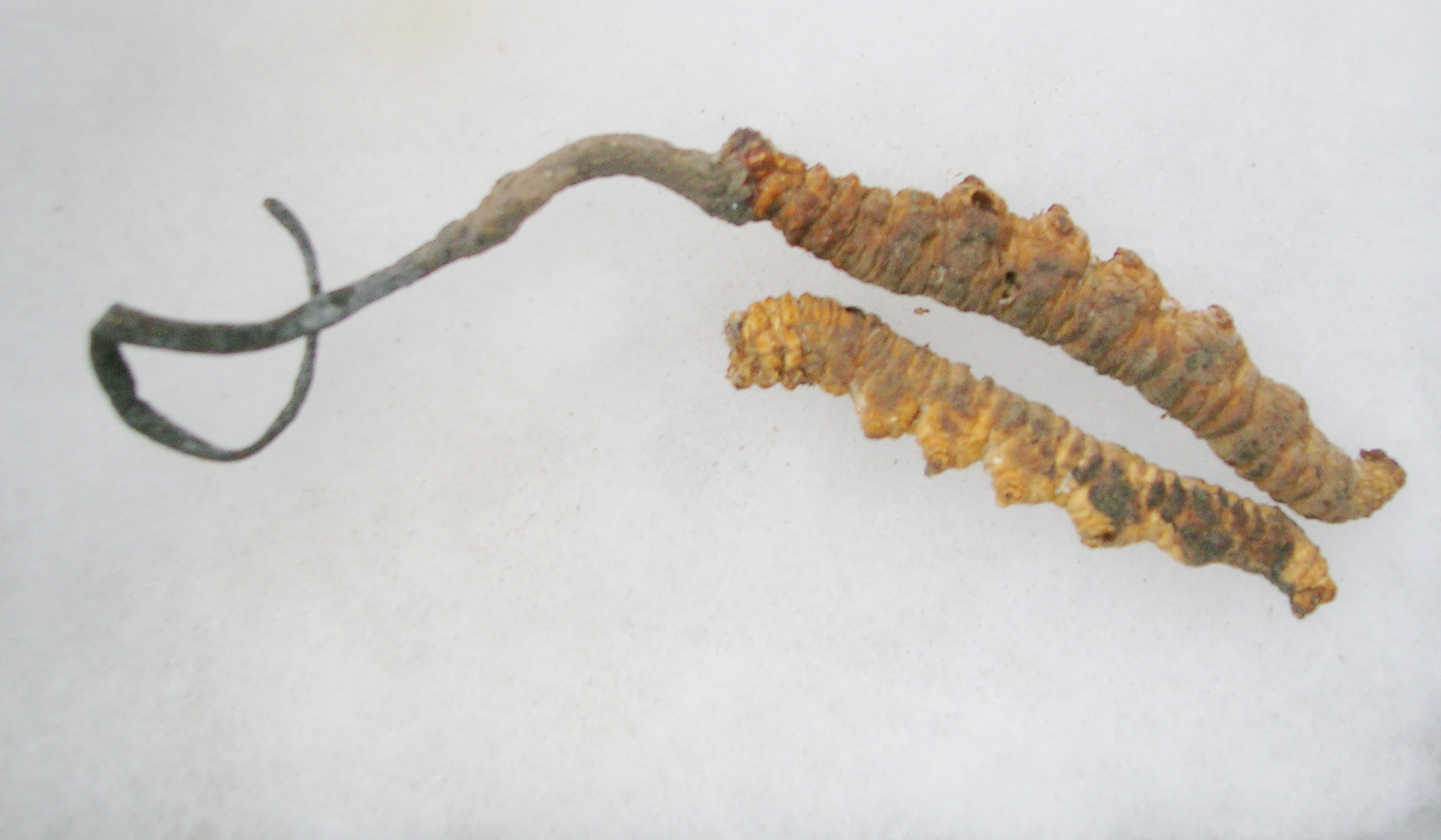
Ophiocordyceps sinensis

Caterpillars prone to infection by O. sinensis generally live 15 cm (5.9 in) underground in alpine grass and shrub-lands on the Tibetan Plateau and the Himalayas at an altitude between 3,000 and 5,000 m (9,800 and 16,400 ft). The fungus is reported from the northern range of Nepal, Bhutan, and also from the northern states of India, apart from northern Yunnan, eastern Qinghai, eastern Tibet, western Sichuan, southwestern Gansu provinces. Fifty-seven taxa from several genera (37 Thitarodes, 1 Bipectilus, 1 Endoclita, 1 Gazoryctra, 3 Pharmacis, and 14 others not correctly identified to genus) are recognized as potential hosts of O. sinensis.

The stalk-like dark brown to black fruiting body (or mushroom) grows out of the head of the dead caterpillar and emerges from the soil in alpine meadows by early spring. During late summer, the fruiting body disperses spores. The caterpillars, which live underground feeding on roots, are most vulnerable to the fungus after shedding their skin, during late summer. In late autumn, chemicals on the skin of the caterpillar interact with the fungal spores and release the fungal mycelia, which then infects the caterpillar.

The infected larvae tend to remain underground vertical to the soil surface with their heads up. After invading a host larva, the fungus ramifies throughout the host and eventually kills it. Gradually the host larvae become rigid because of the production of fungal sclerotia. Fungal sclerotia are multihyphal structures that can remain dormant and then germinate to produce spores. After overwintering, the fungus ruptures the host body, forming the fruiting body, a sexual sporulating structure (a perithecial stroma) from the larval head that is connected to the sclerotia in the dead larva below ground and grows upward to emerge from the soil to complete the cycle.

The slow growing O. sinensis grows at a comparatively low temperature, i.e., below 21 °C. Temperature requirements and growth rates are crucial factors that distinguish O. sinensis from other similar fungi. Climate change is suspected to be negatively affecting the mountain organism.

== Use in traditional Asian medicines ==
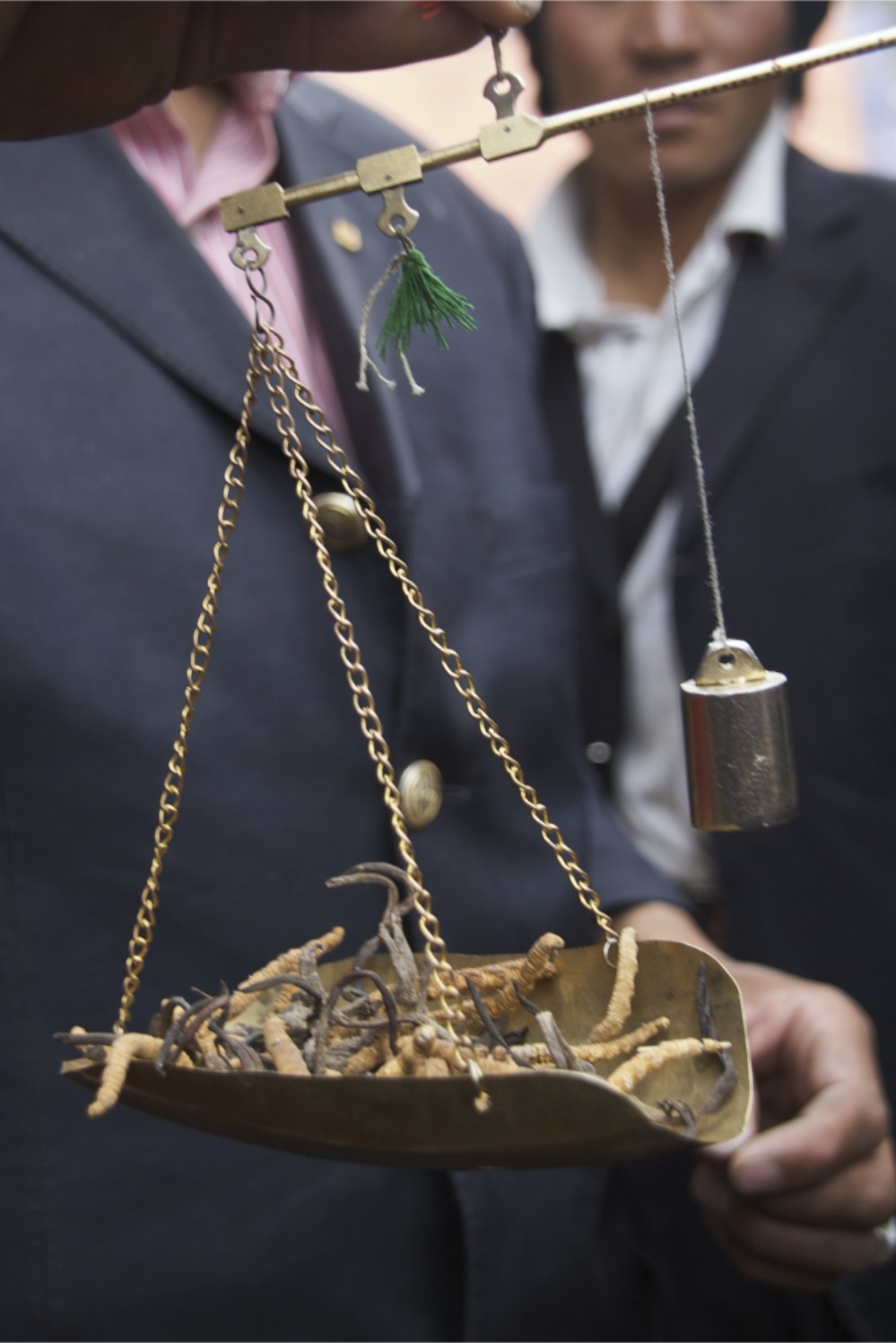
Weighing the precious caterpillar fungus in Yushu, Southern Qinghai, China

The use of caterpillar fungus as folk medicine apparently originated in Tibet and Nepal. So far the oldest known text documenting its use was written in the late 15th century by the Tibetan doctor Zurkhar Nyamnyi Dorje (Wylie: Zur mkhar mnyam nyid rdo rje) [1439–1475]) in his text: Man ngag bye ba ring bsrel ("Instructions on a Myriad of Medicines"), where he describes its use as an aphrodisiac.

The first mention of Ophiocordyceps sinensis in traditional Chinese medicine was in Wang Ang's 1694 compendium of materia medica, Ben Cao Bei Yao. In the 18th century it was listed in Wu Yiluo's Ben cao cong xin ("New compilation of materia medica"). The ethno-mycological knowledge on caterpillar fungus among the Nepalese people is documented. The entire fungus-caterpillar combination is hand-collected for medicinal use.

In traditional Chinese medicine, it is regarded as having an excellent balance of yin and yang as it is considered to be composed of both an animal and a vegetable.

Wild-collected "cordyceps" is not always true O. sinensis, even when the location and the host insect matches. This has resulted in the description of new species such as Cordyceps liangshanensis (Liangshan, China; many Nepali "cordyceps" are also incorrectly identified to be this species, and no new names for them have been proposed yet) and Samsoniella hepiali (Qinghai, China). Despite not being the same species when examined using a modern method, these species are used in broadly the same way in traditional medicine. There are also "cordyceps" species that are traditionally known to be different from O. sinensis but nevertheless thought to be have a similar tonifying action. China is home to at least 299 species of "cordyceps" in this broadest sense.

It is marketed for various health benefits but lacks sufficient scientific evidence for safety or effectiveness, and quality can vary due to inconsistent processing and labeling.

=== Secondary metabolites ===
Cordycepin

A 2008 source reports that O. sinensis contains cordycepin, an adenosine derivative originally discovered in C. militaris. However, this study uses store-bought material labeled as O. sinensis without any molecular confirmation that it is indeed the species. A more in-depth 2017 study, which fully characterized the biosynthetic machinery for cordycepin, found that O. sinensis does not produce cordycepin. This discrepancy underscores the importance of correctly identifying "cordyceps" species.

== Economics ==
In rural Tibet, yartsa gunbu has become the most important source of cash income. The fungi contributed 40% of the annual cash income to local households and 8.5% to the GDP in 2004. Prices have increased continuously, especially since the late 1990s. In 2008, one kilogram traded for US$3,000 (lowest quality) to over US$18,000 (best quality, largest larvae). The annual production on the Tibetan Plateau was estimated in 2009 at 80–175 tons. The Himalayan Ophiocordyceps production might not exceed a few tons.

In 2004 the value of a kilogram of caterpillars was estimated at रु30,000–60,000 Nepali rupees in Nepal, and about ₹100,000 Indian rupees in India. In 2011, the estimated value in Nepal increased to रु350,000–450,000. A 2012 BBC article indicated that in north Indian villages, a single fungus was worth ₹150 (about £2 or $3), which was more than the daily wage of a manual labourer. In 2012, a pound of top-quality yartsa had reached retail prices of US$50,000.

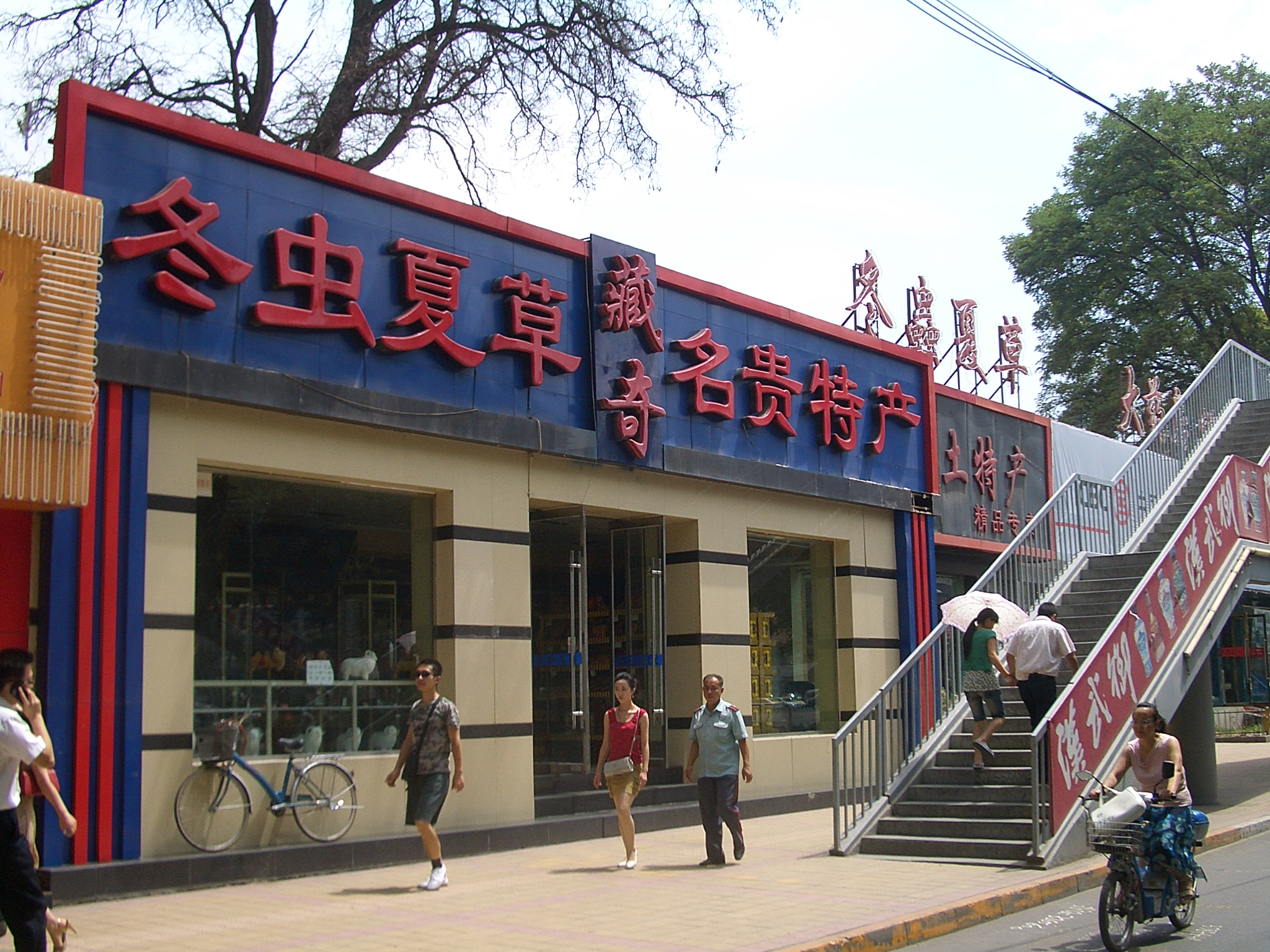
A shop in Lanzhou advertising Dōng chóng xià cǎo (冬虫夏草) among other local specialties.

The price of Ophiocordyceps sinensis is reported to have increased dramatically on the Tibetan Plateau, about 900% between 1998 and 2008, an annual average of over 20% (after inflation). However, the value of large caterpillar fungus has increased more dramatically than small Cordyceps, regarded as lower quality.

| Year | % Price Increase | Price/kg (Yuan) |
|---|---|---|
| 1980s | | 1,800 |
| 1997 | 467% (incl. inflation) | 8,400 |
| 2004 | 429% (incl. inflation) | 36,000 |
| 2005 | | 10,000–60,000 |
| 2013 | | 125,000–500,000 |

In the Kingdom of Bhutan, Ophiocordyceps sinensis is recently also being harvested. The Bhutanese "cordyceps" has been molecularly confirmed to be O. sinensis, with its quality shown to be equal to the Tibetan one.

== Impacts of wild collection ==
=== Societal impact ===
Because of its high value, inter-village conflicts over access to its grassland habitats have become a problem for the local governing bodies, and in several cases, people were killed. In November 2011, a court in Nepal convicted 19 villagers over the murder of a group of farmers during a fight over the prized aphrodisiac fungus. Seven farmers were killed in the remote northern district of Manang in June 2009 after going to forage for Yarchagumba.

Its value gave it a role in the Nepalese Civil War, as the Nepalese Maoists and government forces fought for control of the lucrative export trade during the June–July harvest season. Collecting yarchagumba in Nepal had only been legalised in 2001, and now demand is highest in countries such as China, Thailand, Vietnam, Korea and Japan. By 2002, the 'herb' was valued at रु105,000 ($1,435) per kilogram, allowing the government to charge a royalty of रु20,000 ($280) per kilogram.

=== Ecological impact ===
The search for Ophiocordyceps sinensis is often perceived to threaten the environment of the Tibetan Plateau where it grows. While it has been collected for centuries and is still common in such areas, current collection rates are much higher than in historical times.

In India, fuelwood cutting by Ophiocordyceps sinensis collectors near the treeline is reported to be depleting populations of tree species such as Himalayan birch Betula utilis.

== Cultivation ==
=== Mycelia ===
Cultivated O. sinensis mycelium is an alternative to wild-harvested O. sinensis, and producers claim it may offer improved consistency. Artificial culture of O. sinensis is typically by growth of pure mycelia in liquid culture (in China) or on grains (in the West).

Ophiocordyceps sinensis is now cultivated on an industrial scale for their use in traditional Chinese medicine. However, no one has succeeded so far in rearing the fungus by infecting cultivated caterpillars; all products derived from cultured Ophiocordyceps are derived from mycelia grown on grains or in liquids.

In China, the mycelia is used as a powder called in Chinese: 发酵冬虫夏草菌粉; lit. 'fermented winter-worm-summer-grass powder'. However, the same term is also informally used for the powdered mycelia of the related Samsoniella hepiali, also a pathogen of ghost moths.

In Vietnam, according to the statistics of the Ministry of Agriculture and Rural Development, the production of cultivated "cordyceps" (đông trùng hạ thảo) (Note: The cited Vietnamese-language sources do not make it particularly clear whether the mentioned đông trùng hạ thảo is true O. sinensis. Vietnam is also known to cultivate C. militaris.) in 2022 reached about 1,000 tons, an increase of five times compared to 2017. The selling price of fresh O. sinensis ranges from ₫10–20 million VND per kilogram, while dried O. sinensis ranges from ₫100-200 million per kilogram. Therefore, the economic value of cultivated "cordyceps" in Vietnam is estimated to be around ₫10,000 billion VND per year. In the period 2017-2022, the production of cultivated "cordyceps" has grown at an average rate of 40% per year.

=== Fruiting body ===
A fruiting body with a mature perithecium was first grown in laboratory conditions in China in 1983, using a growth media. By 2014, it was possible to obtain a mature fruiting body with a rice-based growth media in a low-altitude location. However, such amorphous culture media do not generate a product with the traditional presentation of "worm and grass".

Inoculation of caterpillars leading to a fully mature fruiting body was reported in 1991. This led to an early form of cultivation: caterpillars were artificially inoculated with the fungus, then placed into the natural habitat to induce the generation of the fruiting body. This increased the yield of the product, but was still subject to climate variations. In 2016, it became possible to mature the inoculated insects in a controlled environment. O. sinensis cultivated this way has been commercialized in China.

Rearing of the caterpillars intended for inoculation can be affected by parasitic nematodes and other entomopathogenic fungi in the environment. Maturation of inoculated caterpillars can be disrupted by rodents eating them as food. Growth media may become a food source for Sciara flies.

=== Cultivated alternatives ===
A number of related Hypocreales fungi have been collected in the field and found to be more amenable to cultivation. These fungi contain many of the same secondary metabolites as those in O. sinensis and Asian sources claim a similar spectrum of pharmacological effects. It has also been used in traditional medicine as a substitute:

- Cordyceps militaris fruiting body is cultivated in China, Vietnam, Taiwan, and Indonesia. The golden-colored fruiting body is eaten as an inexpensive mushroom.
- Samsoniella hepiali mycelia is cultivated in China. It is used in two "Jinshuibao" products found in the Pharmacopoeia of the People's Republic of China and more than 260 healthcare products in China, with a total market worth of approximately ¥10 billion.
- Paecilomyces tenuipes contains acetoxyscirpenediol and ergosterol peroxide. It is cultivated in Korea.

In some traditional-medicine contexts, it is acceptable to include the above alternatives in the term "cordyceps" or 虫草. Li et al. (2023) (in Chinese) provides a more detailed overview of the cultivation of Cordyceps sensu lato globally.

== See also ==
- List of fungi by conservation status
