= Samsoniella hepiali =

Scientific classification
- Domain: Eukaryota
- Kingdom: Fungi
- Division: Ascomycota
- Class: Sordariomycetes
- Order: Hypocreales
- Family: Cordycipitaceae
- Genus: Samsoniella
- Species: S. hepiali

Binomial name
- Samsoniella hepiali (Q.T. Chen & R.Q. Dai ex R.Q. Dai et al.) H. Yu, R.Q. Dai, Y.B. Wang, Y. Wang & Zhu L. Yang, 2020

Synonyms
- Paecilomyces hepiali Q.T. Chen & R.Q. Dai ex R.Q. Dai et al., 2008

Species of fungus

Samsoniella hepiali is an entomopathogenic fungus. It was discovered in 1982 as a fungus infecting a field collection of infected Hepialus armoricanus originally presumed to be Ophiocordyceps sinensis. It is chemically and pharmacologically similar to O. sinensis, but differs significantly in terms of morphology. Later studies have also confirmed that it is genetically distinct from O. sinensis. It is known to produce cordycepin.

Because of its pharmacological similarities to true O. sinensis, it is also known as a type of "cordyceps" for human consumption.

== Range ==
Samsoniella hepiali was originally collected in Qinghai, China on ghost moths. Isolates matching the diagnostic DNA sequences were also found in Anhui, China infecting leafhoppers and cicada; in Buenos Aires, Argentina infecting whiteflies and living in soil; and in Guizhou, China infecting ants.

== Type strains ==
The original strain isolated is called "82-2" and is deposited as a dry culture in the Herbarium of Institute of Chinese Materia Medica (ICMM). However, the Herbarium's confidentiality rules made "82-2" inaccessible to even Chinese researchers. Wang et al.'s 2015 article in Taxon argues that this makes the holotype effectively "lost" and proposed the more available strain "Cs-4" to be the neotype. "Cs-4" was separately collected from Qinghai and Q.T. Chen et al. had previously confirmed its identity as belonging in this species. In 2018 however, the change was apparently overturned by another Taxon article written by researchers at the ICMM and other institutes arguing that 82-2 has always been publicly accessible.

As of April 2025, the NCBI lists a current neotype, CGMCC 3.17103. Index Fungorum identifies CGMCC 3.17103 with the 2015 proposal of Wang et al., which would suggest that it's the formal identifier for "Cs-4". This would also suggest that the neotype was not overturned.

== Taxonomic history ==
Q.T. Chen et al. originally placed the species in genus Paecilomyces. In the 1989 definition, P. hepiali is distinguished from P. xylariformis "in the shape and size of conidia and the associated host insects", and from P. farinosus "in the shape and arrangement of phialides, the shape of conidia, its host (Hepialus) and habitat at an altitude of 3000‒4500 m". The 1989 definition was not a valid publication because there was no living holotype specified. This was rectified in 2008 when the authors used the aforementioned dry culture at ICMM as the holotype.

A 2020 genetic study, using CGMCC 3.17103 (Cs-4) and seven additional samples, found that what was known as P. hepiali should be placed into the genus Samsoniella. As a result, the current correct name is Samsoniella hepiali. The same article also identified numerous new species of cordycipitoid fungi, in genus Samsoniella and beyond.

== Society and culture ==
=== Names ===
Paecilomyces hepiali is translated as 蝙蝠蛾拟青霉 "bat-moth [Paecilomyces = pseudo-green-mold]" in Chinese. The first three characters correspond to the specific epithet (hepiali: associated with ghost moths), and the rest corresponds to the genus name.

Wang YB et al. (2020) proposes for Samsoniella to be translated as 鳞翅虫草属 "Lepidoptera cordyceps genus" in Chinese, and Samsoniella hepiali as 蝙蝠蛾虫草 "bat-moth cordyceps".

=== Ethnopharmacology ===
Samsoniella hepiali strain Cs-4 is used in an approved, prescription-only Chinese patent medicine product called "Jinshuibao" found in the Pharmacopoeia of the People's Republic of China. The Pharmacopoeia attributes it with lung, kidney, and chi-restorative properties similar to what is traditionally attributed to O. sinensis.

Samsoniella hepiali is also used in more than 260 healthcare products (dietary supplements and similar) in China, with a total market worth of approximately 10 billion RMB.
