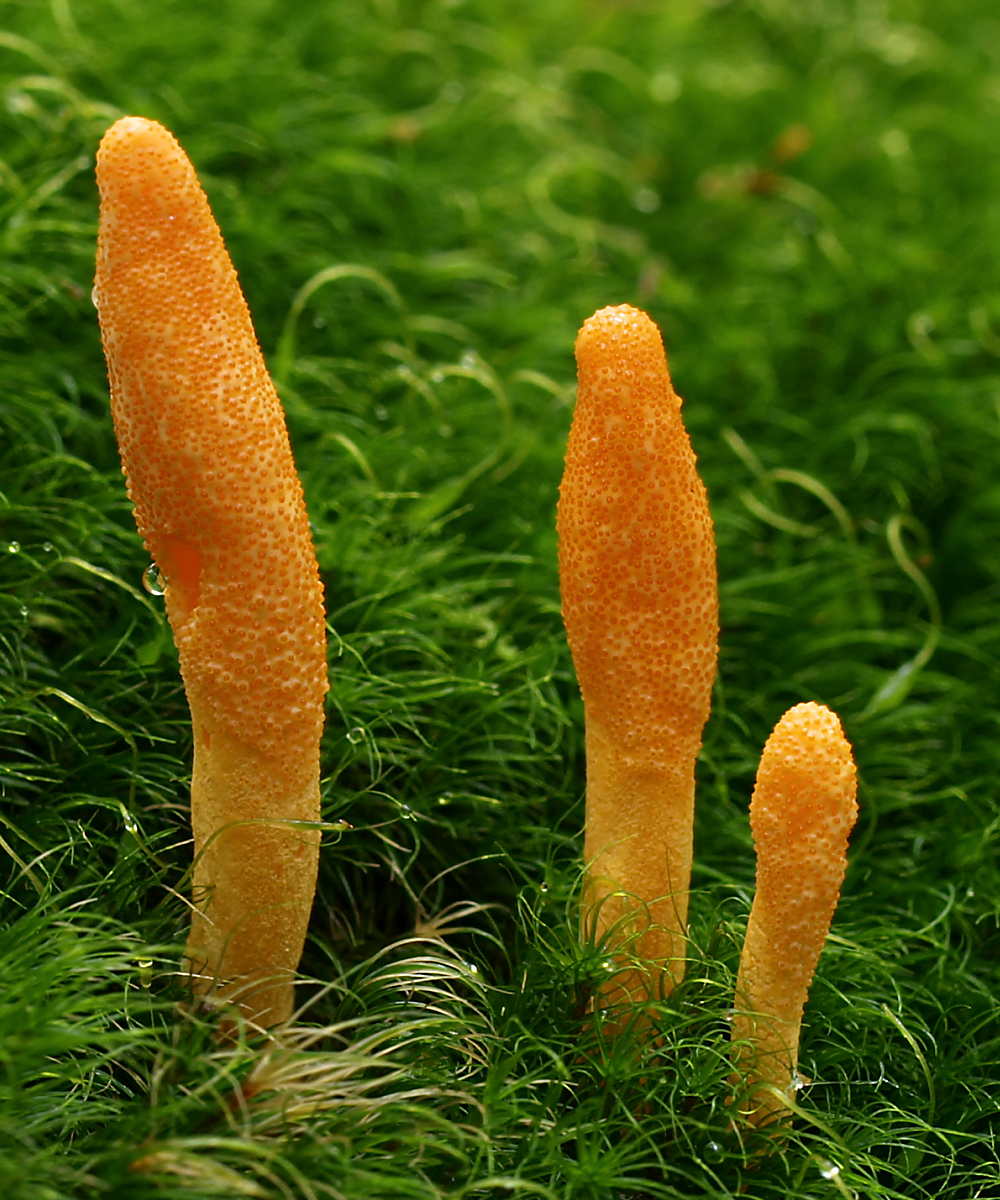

Scientific classification
- Kingdom: Fungi
- Division: Ascomycota
- Class: Sordariomycetes
- Order: Hypocreales
- Family: Cordycipitaceae
- Genus: Cordyceps
- Species: C. militaris

Binomial name
- Cordyceps militaris (L.) Fr. (1818)

Synonyms
- Clavaria militaris L. (1753); Sphaeria militaris (L.) J.F. Gmel. (1792); Cordylia militaris (L.) Fr. (1818); Hypoxylon militare (L.) Mérat, (1821); Xylaria militaris (L.) Gray (1821); Corynesphaera militaris (L.) Dumort. (1822); Kentrosporium militare (L.) Wallr. (1844); Torrubia militaris (L.) Tul. & C. Tul. (1865)

= Cordyceps militaris =

Species of fungus

Cordyceps militaris, commonly known as the caterpillar fungus, is a species of fungus in the family Cordycipitaceae, and the type species of the genus Cordyceps, which consists of hundreds of species. The species was originally described by Carl Linnaeus in 1753 as Clavaria militaris. Cordyceps militaris parasitizes insects and is used in traditional Chinese medicine.

It is commonly marketed as a dietary supplement for various health benefits but lacks sufficient scientific evidence for safety or effectiveness, and quality can vary due to inconsistent processing and labeling.

== Description ==
The fungus forms 1–8 centimetres (1/2–3 1/4 in) high, club-shaped and orange/red fruiting bodies, which grow out of dead underground pupae. The club is covered with the stroma, into which the actual fruit bodies, the perithecia, are inserted. The surface appears roughly punctured. The inner fungal tissue is whitish to pale orange.

=== Microscopic features ===
The spores are smooth, hyaline, long-filiform, and often septate. They decompose to maturity in 3–7 μm × 1–1.2 μm sub pores. The asci are long and cylindrical. Sometimes an anamorphic state, which is Isaria, is found. Masses of white mycelia form around the parasitized insect; however, these may not be of the same species.

=== Similar species ===
There are over 400 wild Cordyceps species. Some similar species include C. sobolifera, Elaphocordyceps capitata, and E. ophioglossoides.

== Distribution and habitat ==
Many authors consider C. militaris quite common, spread throughout the Northern Hemisphere, and fruiting bodies appear in Europe from August to November.

== Uses ==
Cordyceps militaris
- Mycological characteristics
- Smooth hymenium
- No distinct cap
- Hymenium attachment is irregular or not applicable
- Stipe is bare
- Ecology is parasitic
- Edibility is edible or inedible

It is considered inedible or "probably edible" by North American field guides. In Asia the fruiting body is cooked as a mushroom in dishes like chicken soup, pork bone soup and hot pot. It is approved as a novel food in China.

It is commonly marketed as a dietary supplement for various health benefits but lacks sufficient scientific evidence for safety or effectiveness, and quality can vary due to inconsistent processing and labeling. Health claims are largely due to its similarity to Ophiocordyceps sinensis, itself with unproven effects.

=== Cultivation ===
C. militaris can be cultivated in a variety of media, including silkworm pupae, rice, and liquid nutrition. It is cultivated in China, Vietnam, Taiwan, and Indonesia.

C. militaris crops can be affected by pathogenic molds that parasitize and kill the fungus.

=== Phytochemistry ===
C. militaris produces cordycepin, a nucleoside analog of adenosine.

C. militaris contains a protein CMP18 which induces apoptosis in vitro via a mitochondrion-dependent pathway. It is thought that it might be toxic when eaten. Cooking destroys this protein.

=== Drug production ===
For cordycepin to accumulate, the fungus also produces pentostatin to protect cordycepin from adenosine deaminase. A transgenic version of C. militaris with added cellulase genes is able to grow on cellulose-rich waste and convert it into this valuable drug. Pentostatin (Nipent) is used in chemotherapy for people with hairy cell leukemia.

== Gallery ==
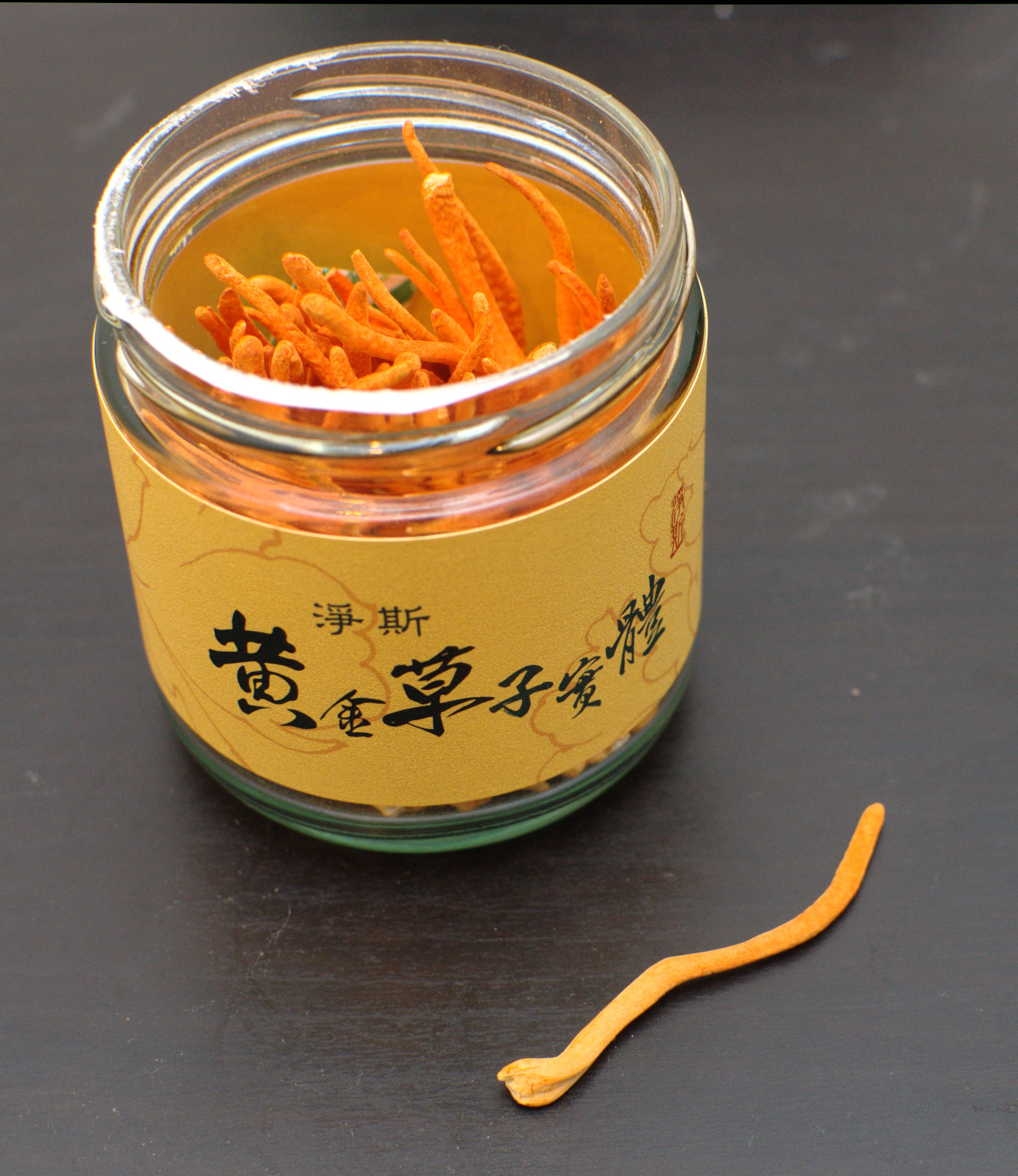
A jar of dry C. militaris fruiting body

Packs of fresh C. militaris at an Aldi in Shanghai (CN¥ 2.39 ≈ US$ 0.36 per 120 g)
