= Cordycepin =

Names
- IUPAC name 3′-Deoxyadenosine
- Systematic IUPAC name (2S,3R,5S)-2-(6-Amino-9H-purin-9-yl)-5-(hydroxymethyl)oxolan-3-ol
- Other names Cordycepine; 9-(3-Deoxy-β-D-ribofuranosyl)adenine; 3-dA

Identifiers
CAS Number	73-03-0
3D model (JSmol)	Interactive image; Interactive image
ChEMBL	ChEMBL305686
ChemSpider	6064
ECHA InfoCard	100.000.720
IUPHAR/BPS	4630
PubChem CID	6303
UNII	GZ8VF4M2J8
CompTox Dashboard (EPA)	DTXSID1041007
- InChI: InChI=1S/C10H13N5O3/c11-8-7-9(13-3-12-8)15(4-14-7)10-6(17)1-5(2-16)18-10/h3-6,10,16-17H,1-2H2,(H2,11,12,13)/t5-,6+,10+/m0/s1 Key: OFEZSBMBBKLLBJ-BAJZRUMYSA-N
- SMILES: O[C@@H]1C[C@@H](CO)O[C@H]1N2C(N=CN=C3N)=C3N=C2; n2c1c(ncnc1n(c2)[C@@H]3O[C@@H](C[C@H]3O)CO)N

Properties
Chemical formula	C_{10}H_{13}N_{5}O_{3}
Molar mass	251.246 g·mol^{−1}
Melting point	225.5 °C (437.9 °F; 498.6 K)
- Except where otherwise noted, data are given for materials in their standard state (at 25 °C [77 °F], 100 kPa). verify (what is ?) Infobox references

Cordycepin, or 3'-deoxyadenosine, is a derivative of the nucleoside adenosine, differing from the latter by the replacement of the hydroxy group in the 3' position with a hydrogen. It was initially extracted from the fungus Cordyceps militaris, but can now be produced synthetically.

== Occurrence ==
It is also produced by Cordyceps kyusyuensis (a close relative of C. militaris), but not by other insect pathogenic fungi such as C. bassiana, C. confragosa, C. takaomontana, Isaria fumosorosea, M. robertsii, and M. rileyi.

Evidence for cordycepin in Ophiocordyceps sinensis (syn. Cordyceps sinensis) has been mixed, and its presence in this species was long considered controversial. More recent analyses using authenticated material and sensitive methods have detected low but measurable amounts: an HPLC–MS/MS study quantified cordycepin at 0.0076–0.029% (w/w) in authenticated wild material, a PLOS ONE comparison reported cordycepin in both cultivated and wild forms (higher on average in cultivated), and independent HPLC work found ~3 ppm in both wild and in‑vitro‑cultured O. sinensis mycelium. Overall, reported detection appears to be sample‑ and method‑dependent.

It is also produced by Samsoniella hepiali (fungus identity confirmed by 18S rRNA) and Aspergillus nidulans Y176-2.

== Biosynthesis ==
The biosynthetic genes for cordycepin were fully characterized in 2017. The same set of genes also produce pentostatin, another adenosine derivative. Pentostatin protects cordycepin from being deaminated in the fungus, allowing the latter to accumulate.

The biosynthetic cluster consists of four genes:

- Cns1 is a oxidoreductase/dehydrogenase.
- Cns2 is a HDc-family metal-dependent phosphohydrolase. There is a binding interaction between Cns1 and Cns2.
- Cns3 is a bifunctional protein. It has an N-terminal (9–101 aa) nucleoside/nucleotide kinase (NK) domain and a C-terminal (681-851 aa) HisG-family ATP phosphoribosyltransferase domain.
- Cns4 is an ABC transporter, specifically of the putative pleiotropic drug resistance (PDR) family.

To produce cordycepin:

- The NK domain of Cns3 converts adenosine into 3′-adenosine monophosphate (3′-AMP, different from the more common 5′-AMP).
- Cns2 removes a phosphate group from 3′-AMP and generates 2′-carbonyl-3′-deoxyadenosine (2′-C-3′-dA).
- Cns1 reduces the carbonyl group on 2′-C-3′-dA into a hydroxyl group, yielding cordycepin.

To produce pentostatin:

- The HisG domain of Cns3 converts adenosine into pentostatin.

Cns4 is able to pump pentostatin out of the cell. One reasonable guess for its function would be that pumping out pentostatin allows cordycepin to be detoxified by deamination (cordycepin is toxic to the fungal cell in excessive concentrations).

Intriguingly, the industrial fungus Acremonium chrysogenum features a gene cluster with high conservation with the Cns cluster, yet the fungus is not observed to produce cordycepin.

== Biological activity ==
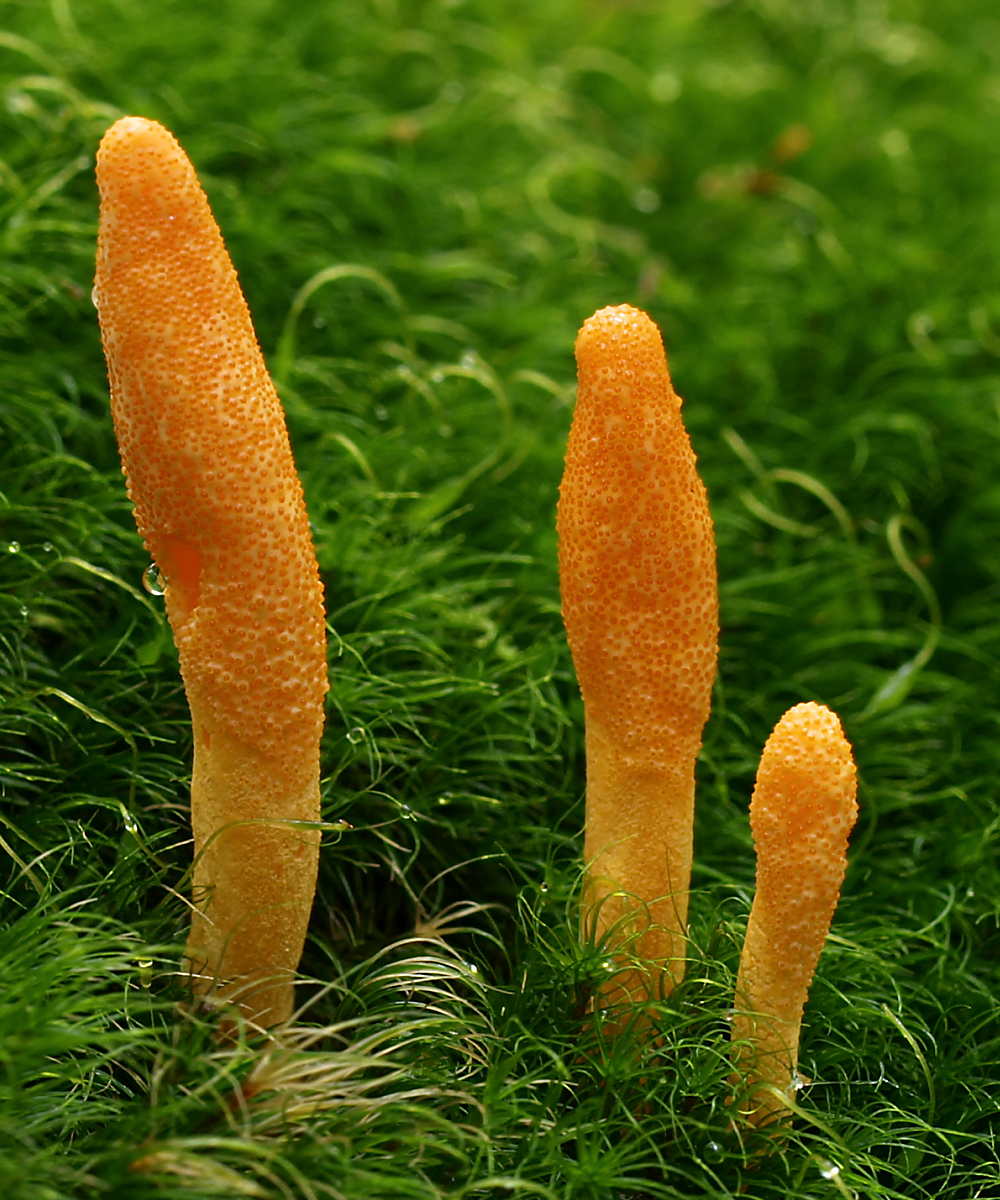
Cordyceps militaris produces cordycepin and was used as a source before synthetic processes were discovered.

Cordyceps fungi produce cordycepin as a means of infecting insect populations, due to its biological activity. Precisely how it works in insects is unknown, but higher cordycepin production is associated with higher larval mortality and more fungus growth. When cordycepin is added to an insect infected by a fungus unable to produce cordycepin, the infection is also enhanced.

Because cordycepin is similar to adenosine, some enzymes cannot discriminate between the two. It can therefore participate in certain biochemical reactions (for example, 3-dA can trigger the premature termination of mRNA synthesis). Cordycepin has displayed cytotoxicity against some leukemic cell lines in vitro. Additionally, cordycepin displays an effect in cancers, such as lung, renal, colon, and breast cancer. Cordycepin reduces viable A549 lung cancer cell populations by 50%.

By acting at RUVBL2, cordycepin is the most potent molecular circadian clock resetter out of several screened compounds. In mice, administration of cordycepin (at 1 hour before lights-out for; 1 hour before lights-on for phase delay) greatly accelerated the adaptation to 8-hour jet lags.

Cordycepin produces rapid, robust imipramine-like antidepressant effects in animal models of depression, and these effects, similarly to those of imipramine, are dependent on enhancement of AMPA receptor signaling. Increased phosphorylation of GSK3β and subsequent β-catenin increase could be another mechanism. Yet another article argues for a role of the gut microbiome while also showing an effect on adipose tissue.

Cordycepin has anti-inflammatory qualities, as well as the ability to defend against injury from cerebral ischemia in mice.

== Biotechnology ==
There is a genome-scale metabolic model (GEM) of Cordyceps militaris called iNR1329. It has been used to find the optimal media C:N ratio for fast growth and cordycepin overproduction of the fungus, at 8:1, with glucose as the carbon source and ammonia as the nitrogen source. The maximal extracellular cordycepin production achieved at the level was 0.3776 g/L (over 7 days). The model-estimated maximal cordycepin production flux was 0.7 mmol/gDW/h.

Wild-type Samsoniella hepiali in submerged cultivation at 25 °C yields 0.26 mg/gDCW over 5 days. With radiation mutagenesis and screening, a mutant strain "ZJB18001" that produces 0.61 mg/g was found.

== Pharmacokinetics ==
Cordycepin readily crosses the blood-brain barrier. It has a very short half-life (between 1 and 2h in cell culture). Pentostatin greatly enhances its clock-resetting effects in cell cultures, likely by preventing deamination.

== See also ==
- 2'-Deoxyadenosine
