= Deoxyadenosine =

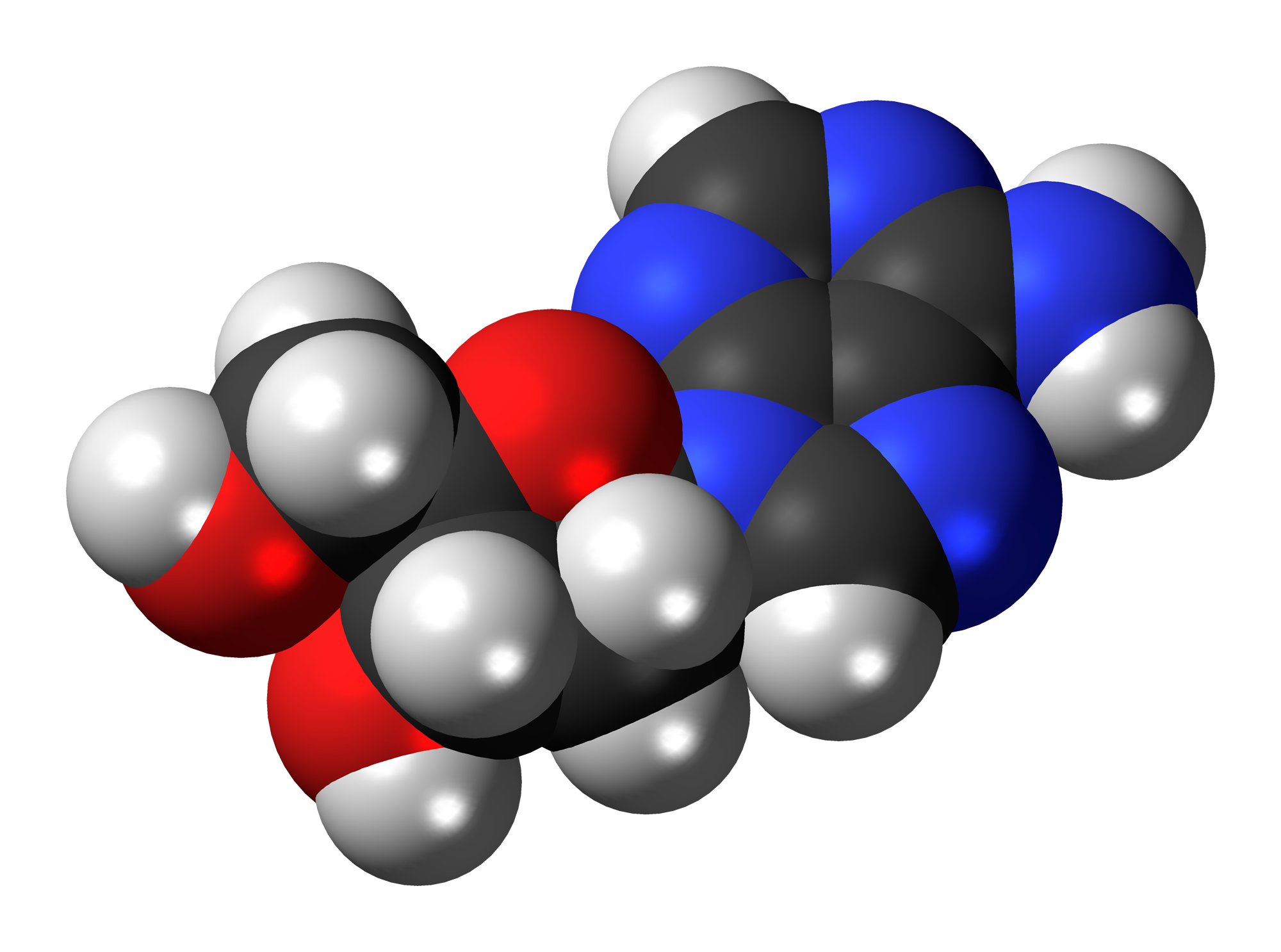

Names
- IUPAC name (2R,3S,5R)-5-(6-Amino-9H-purin-9-yl)-2-(hydroxymethyl)oxolan-3-ol
- Other names 2′-Deoxyadenosine; α-Deoxyadenosine; dA

Identifiers
CAS Number	958-09-8
3D model (JSmol)	Interactive image
ChEBI	CHEBI:17256
ChEMBL	ChEMBL416340
ChemSpider	13135
ECHA InfoCard	100.012.262
IUPHAR/BPS	5109
MeSH	2'-deoxyadenosine
PubChem CID	636
UNII	P582C98ULC
CompTox Dashboard (EPA)	DTXSID10883624
- InChI: InChI=1S/C10H13N5O3/c11-9-8-10(13-3-12-9)15(4-14-8)7-1-5(17)6(2-16)18-7/h3-7,16-17H,1-2H2,(H2,11,12,13)/t5-,6+,7+/m0/s1 Key: OLXZPDWKRNYJJZ-RRKCRQDMSA-N; InChI=1/C10H13N5O3/c11-9-8-10(13-3-12-9)15(4-14-8)7-1-5(17)6(2-16)18-7/h3-7,16-17H,1-2H2,(H2,11,12,13)/t5-,6+,7+/m0/s1 Key: OLXZPDWKRNYJJZ-RRKCRQDMBK
- SMILES: n2c1c(ncnc1n(c2)[C@@H]3O[C@@H]([C@@H](O)C3)CO)N

Properties
Chemical formula	C_{10}H_{13}N_{5}O_{3}
Molar mass	251.246 g·mol^{−1}
- Except where otherwise noted, data are given for materials in their standard state (at 25 °C [77 °F], 100 kPa). verify (what is ?) Infobox references

Deoxyadenosine (symbol dA or dAdo) is a deoxyribonucleoside. It is a derivative of the nucleoside adenosine, differing from the latter by the replacement of a hydroxyl group (-OH) by hydrogen (-H) at the 2′ position of its ribose sugar moiety. Deoxyadenosine is the DNA nucleoside A, which pairs with deoxythymidine (T) in double-stranded DNA.

In absence of adenosine deaminase (ADA) it accumulates in T lymphocytes and kills these cells resulting in a genetic disorder known as adenosine deaminase severe combined immunodeficiency disease (ADA-SCID).

== See also ==
- Deoxyribonucleotide
- Cordycepin (3′-deoxyadenosine)
- Severe combined immunodeficiency
