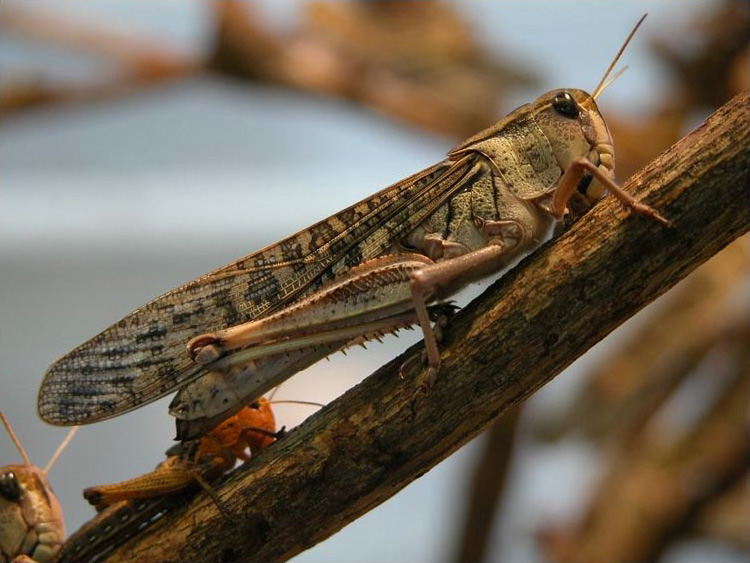
- Female migratory locust

Conservation status
- Least Concern (IUCN 3.1)

Scientific classification
- Kingdom: Animalia
- Phylum: Arthropoda
- Clade: Pancrustacea
- Class: Insecta
- Order: Orthoptera
- Suborder: Caelifera
- Family: Acrididae
- Subfamily: Oedipodinae
- Tribe: Locustini
- Genus: Locusta; Linnaeus, 1758
- Species: L. migratoria

Binomial name
- Locusta migratoria (Linnaeus, 1758)

Synonyms
- Acridium migratorium; Acridium plorans; Pachytylus australis (Saussure, 1884); Pachytylus migratorius (Linnaeus, 1758); Pachytylus migratorioides (Fairmaire & L.J. Reiche, 1849)

= Migratory locust =

Species of grasshopper

Sound of Locusta migratoria
Field recording in the Netherlands 21s

Close-up of a migratory locust

The migratory locust (Locusta migratoria) is the most widespread locust species, and the only species in the genus Locusta. It occurs throughout Africa, Europe, Asia, Australia and New Zealand. Because of the vast geographic area it occupies, which comprises many different ecological zones, numerous subspecies have been described. However, not all experts agree on the validity of some of these subspecies. While it reaches plague proportions in drier areas, it is solitary in northern Australia savannas.

Many other species of grasshopper with gregarious and possibly migratory behaviour are referred to as 'locusts' in the vernacular, including the widely distributed desert locust.

At 6.5 Gbp, the migratory locust possesses one of the largest known insect genomes.

== Polyphenism ==
The migratory locust is polyphenic. It transitions between two main phenotypes in response to population density; the solitary phase and the gregarious phase. As the density of the population increases the locust transforms progressively from the solitary phase towards the gregarious phase with intermediate phases:

Solitaire = solitary phase → transiens congregans (intermediate form) → gregarious phase → transiens dissocians (intermediate form) → solitaire = solitary phase.

Pigmentation and size of the migratory locust vary according to its phase (gregarious or solitary form) and its age. Gregarious nymphs have a yellow to orange covering with black spots; solitary nymphs are green or brown. The gregarious adult is brownish with yellow, the latter colour becoming more intense and extensive on maturation. The solitary adult is brown with varying extent of green colour depending on the colour of the vegetation. Gregarious adults vary in size between 40 and 60 mm according to the sex; they are smaller than the solitary adults.

The phase transition may be mediated by DNA methylation in the brain. Expression of the DNA methyltrasferase gene Dnmt3 is high in the brain of the gregarious form, decreases in gregarious locusts when they are isolated, and increases in solitary locusts when they are crowded. Knock-down reduces phase-related locomotor activity. Transcriptionally, Dnmt3 is linked with phase-core transcriptional factor, hormone receptor HR3.

== Neurochemistry ==
Increased extracellular K^{+} was found to cause membrane depolarization in muscle activating nerves by Hoyle 1953. This then in turn reduces the nerve potential, with the final result of reducing the force output of said muscle. He also found chronic cold temperatures to increase K^{+} in the haemolymph. These changes affect L. migratoria's nerve states because – as with insects and animals in general – nerve cells have a high K permeability, which allows K^{+}'s transmembrane distribution to determine most cellular diffusion potential. This is shaping and will continue to shape the distribution of L. migratoria's range under climate change.

== Relationship with humans ==
=== Economic impact ===
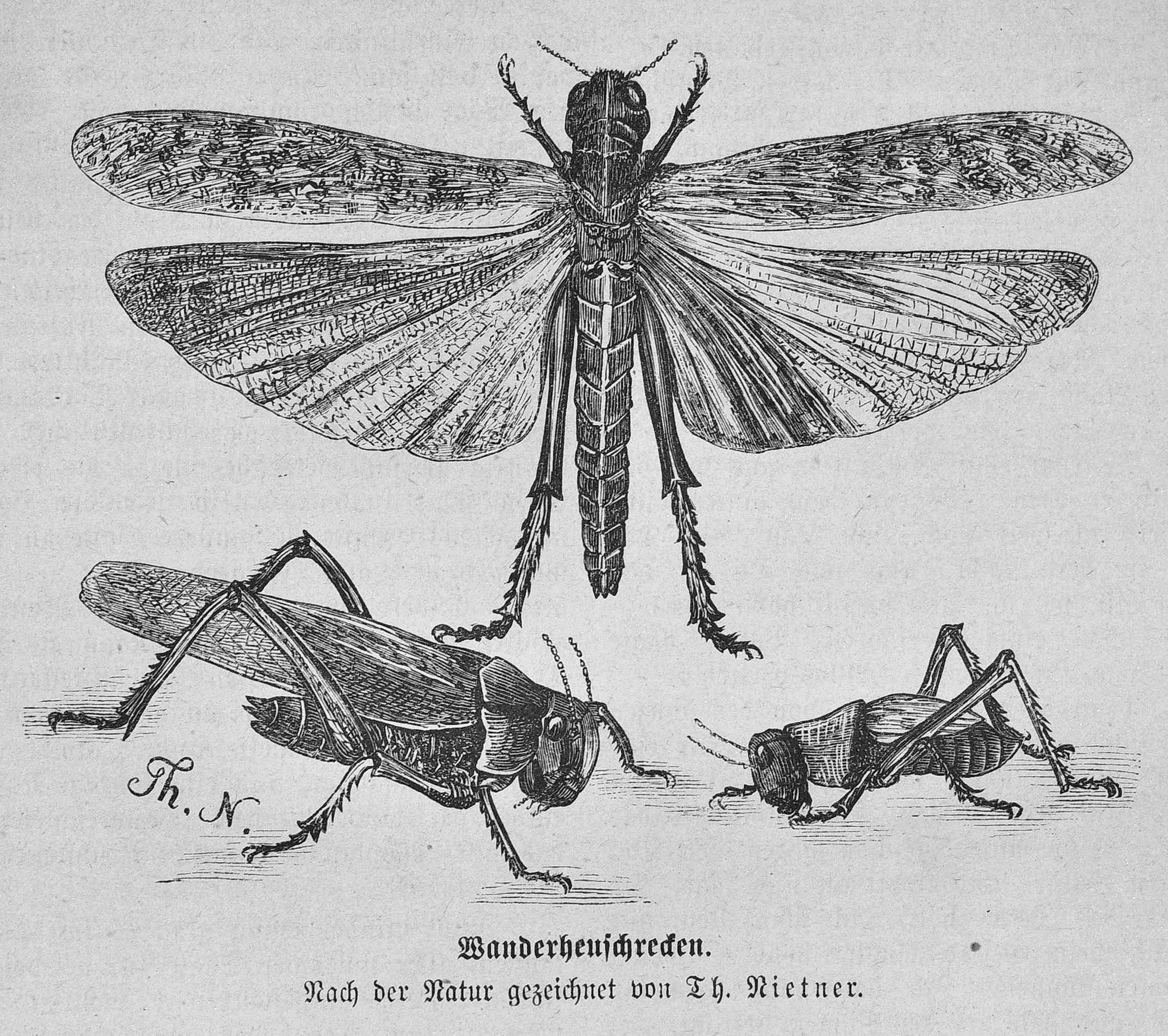
Adult female (top), adult male (bottom left), fifth instar nymph (bottom right)

Locusts are highly mobile, and usually fly with the wind at a speed of about 15 to 20 kilometres per hour (9.3 to 12.4 mph). Swarms can travel 5 to 130 km or more in a day. Locust swarms can vary from less than one square kilometre to several hundred square kilometres with 40 to 80 million individuals per square kilometre. An adult locust can consume its own weight (several grams) in fresh food per day. For every million locusts, one ton of food is eaten.

In Africa, the last serious widespread plague of L. m. migratorioides occurred from 1928 to 1942. Since then, environmental transformations have made the development of swarms from the African migratory locust unlikely. Nevertheless, potential outbreaks are constantly monitored as plagues can be devastating. The Malagasy migratory locust (L. m. capito) still regularly swarms (roughly twice every ten years). The desert locust, which is very similar to the African migratory locust, remains a major threat too.

Locust survey and control are primarily the responsibility of the Ministry of Agriculture in locust-affected countries and are operations undertaken by national locust units. The Food and Agriculture Organization (FAO) of the United Nations provides information on the general locust situation to all interested countries and gives warnings and forecasts to those countries in danger of invasion.

=== As food ===
The migratory locust is an edible insect. In Europe, the migratory locust is officially approved for the use in food in Switzerland (since May 2017). On 2 July 2021, the European Food Safety Agency published a scientific opinion stating that the consumption of migratory locust in frozen, dried or ground state is safe for humans. On 12 November 2021, the EU member states gave their green light for the EU Commission to authorize the placing on the market of migratory locust as a food. This is one of the final steps in the novel food authorization procedure. As a next step, the Commission will now adopt a legal act.

== Subspecies of Locusta migratoria ==
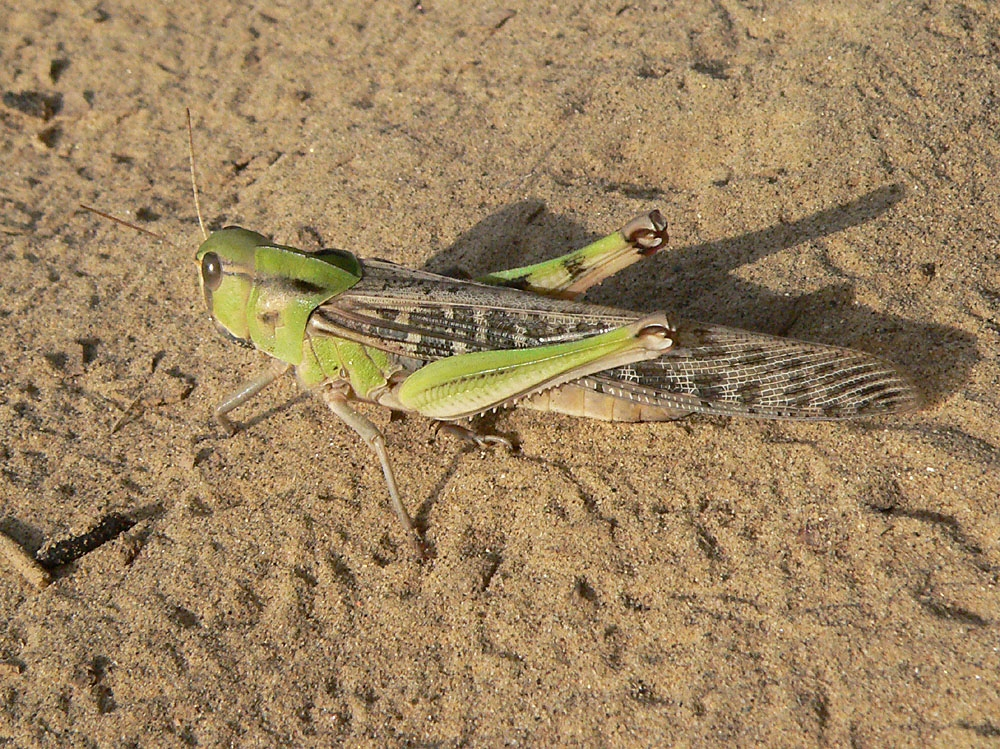
L. m. migratorioides female (solitary)

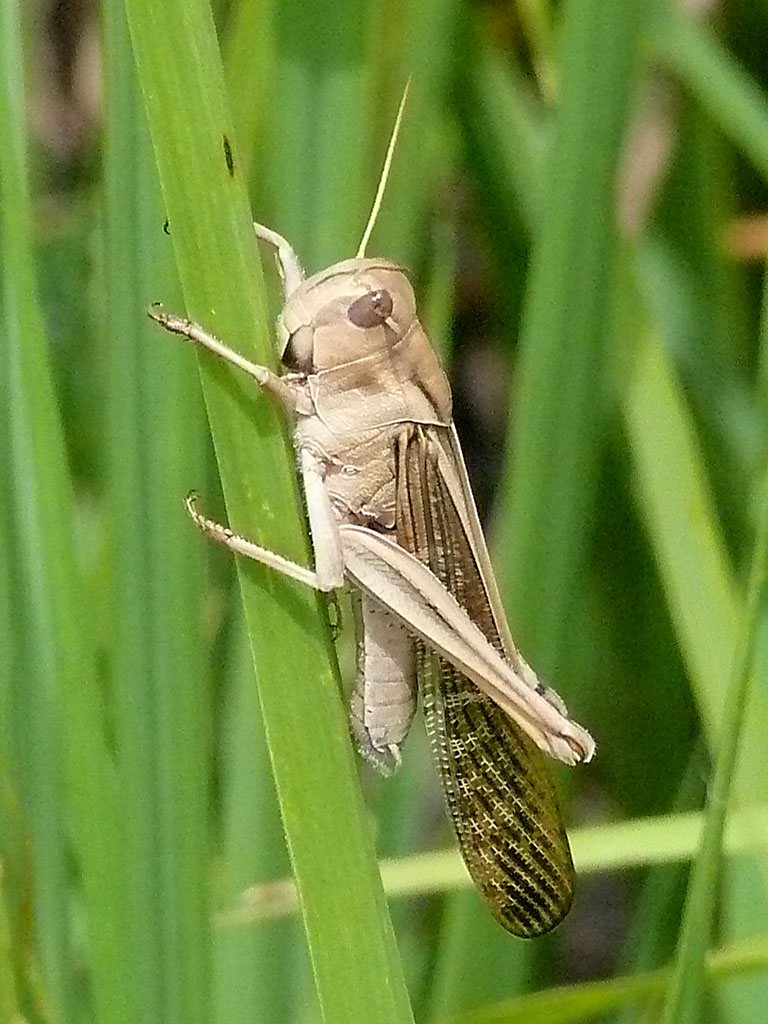
L. m. migratorioides male (solitary)

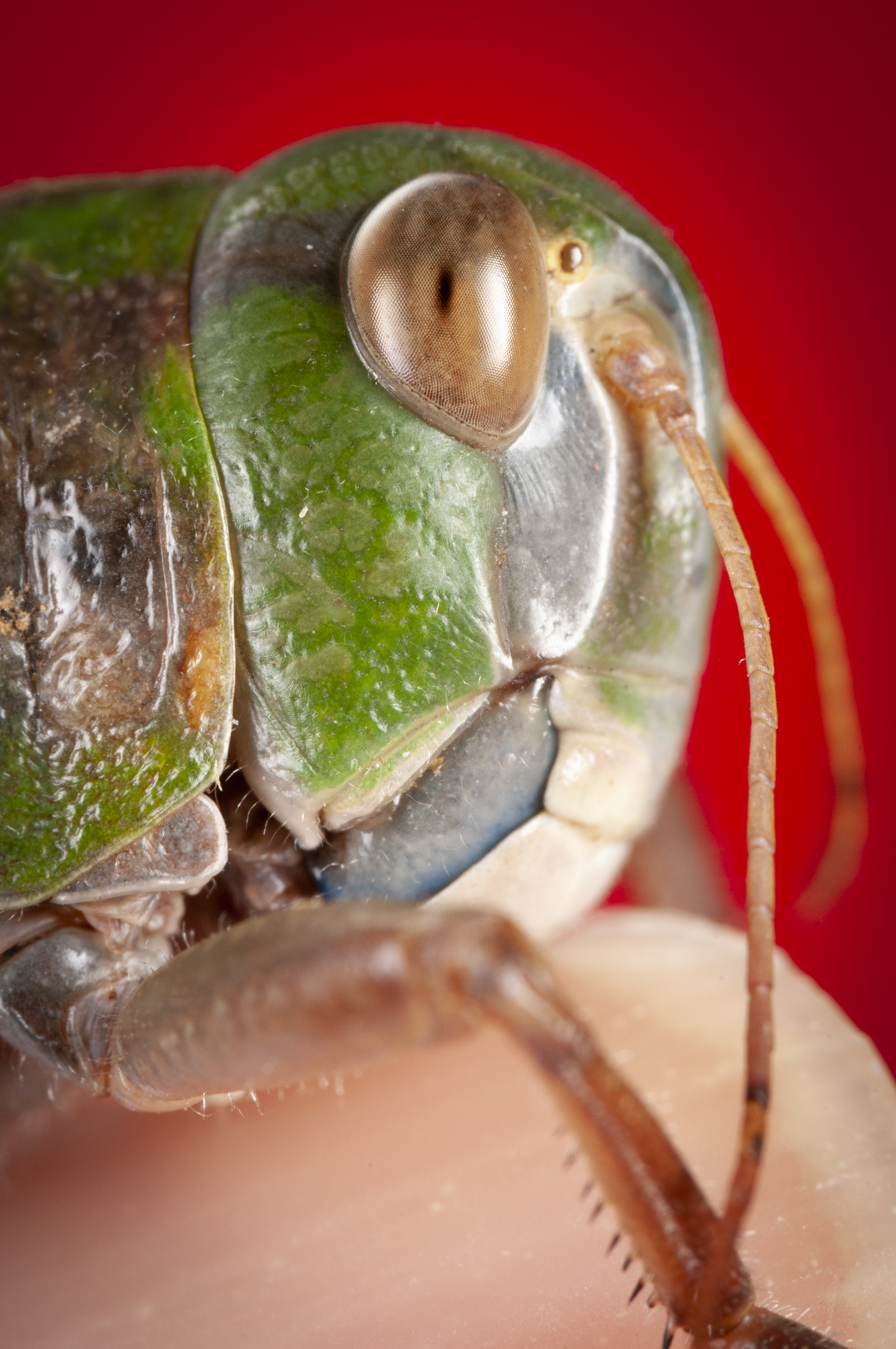
Locusta migratoria migratoria (Head detail)

L. migratoria is found over a vast geographic area, and its range covers many different ecological zones. Because of this, numerous subspecies have been described; however, not all experts agree on the validity of some of these subspecies.

- L. m. burmana Ramme, 1951
- L. m. capito Saussure, 1884 (Malagasy migratory locust: Madagascar)
- L. m. cinerascens Fabricius, 1781 (Italy, Spain)
- L. m. migratoria (Linnaeus, 1758) (europe)
- Locusta migratoria manilensis (Meyen, 1875)
- L. m. migratorioides (Fairmaire & L.J. Reiche, 1849) (African migratory locust: Africa and Atlantic islands)
- L. m. tibetensis Chen, Yonglin, 1963
- L. m. danica (Linnaeus, 1767) = L. m. migratoria (Linnaeus, 1758)
- L. m. gallica Remaudičre, 1947 = L. m. migratoria (Linnaeus, 1758)
- L. m. solitaria Carthy, 1955 = L. m. migratoria (Linnaeus, 1758)

== Other species called 'locusts' ==
Other species of Orthoptera that display gregarious and migratory behaviour are called locusts. This includes:

- American locust, Schistocerca americana
- Australian plague locust, Chortoicetes terminifera
- Bombay locust, Nomadacris succincta
- Brown locust, Locustana pardalina
- Desert locust, Schistocerca gregaria
- Egyptian locust, Anacridium aegyptium
- Italian locust, Calliptamus italicus
- Moroccan locust, Dociostaurus maroccanus
- Red locust, Nomadacris septemfasciata
- Rocky Mountain locust, Melanoplus spretus – extinct
- Sahelian tree locusts, Anacridium melanorhodon
- Spur-throated locust, Austracris guttulosa (note: "spur-throated grasshoppers/locusts" may also refer to spp. in other genera)
- Sudan plague locust, Aiolopus simulatrix

The Senegalese grasshopper (Oedaleus senegalensis) also often displays locust-like behaviour in the Sahel region.

== Photos ==
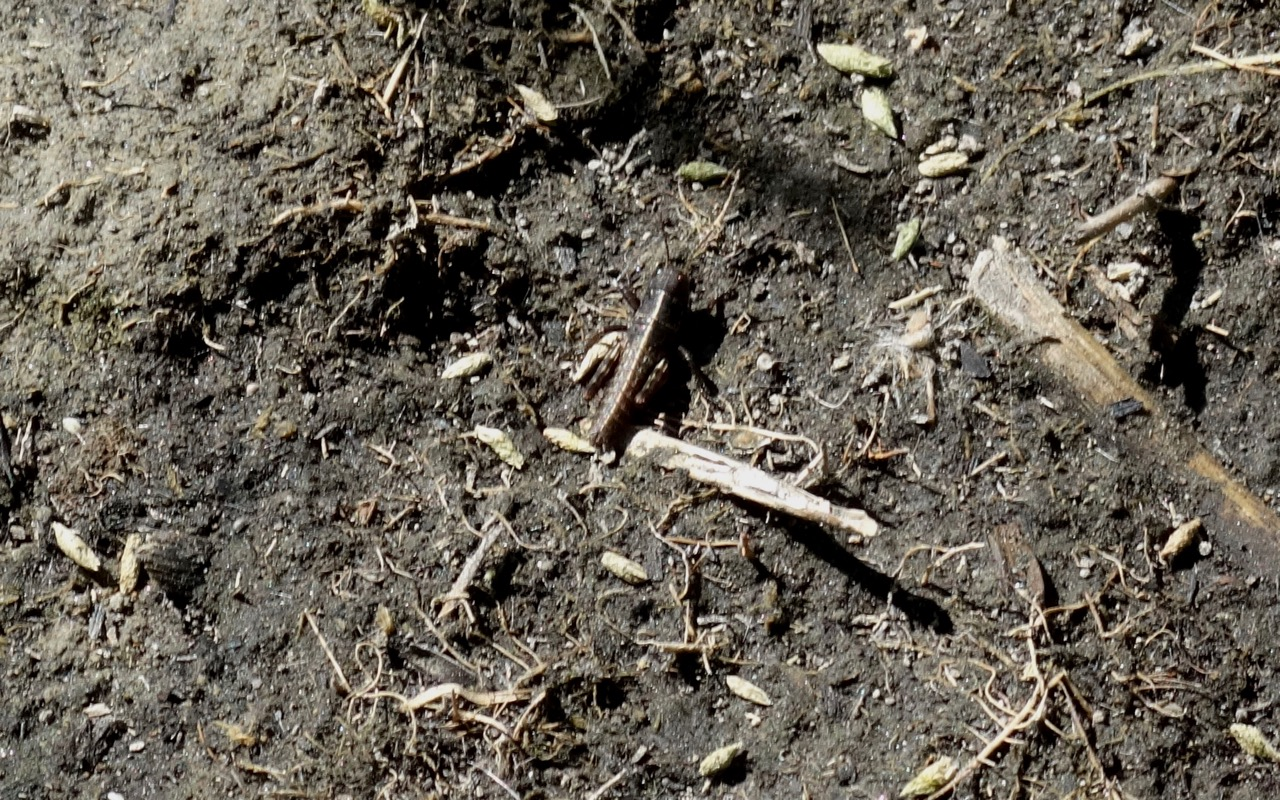
First instar nymph (gregarious)

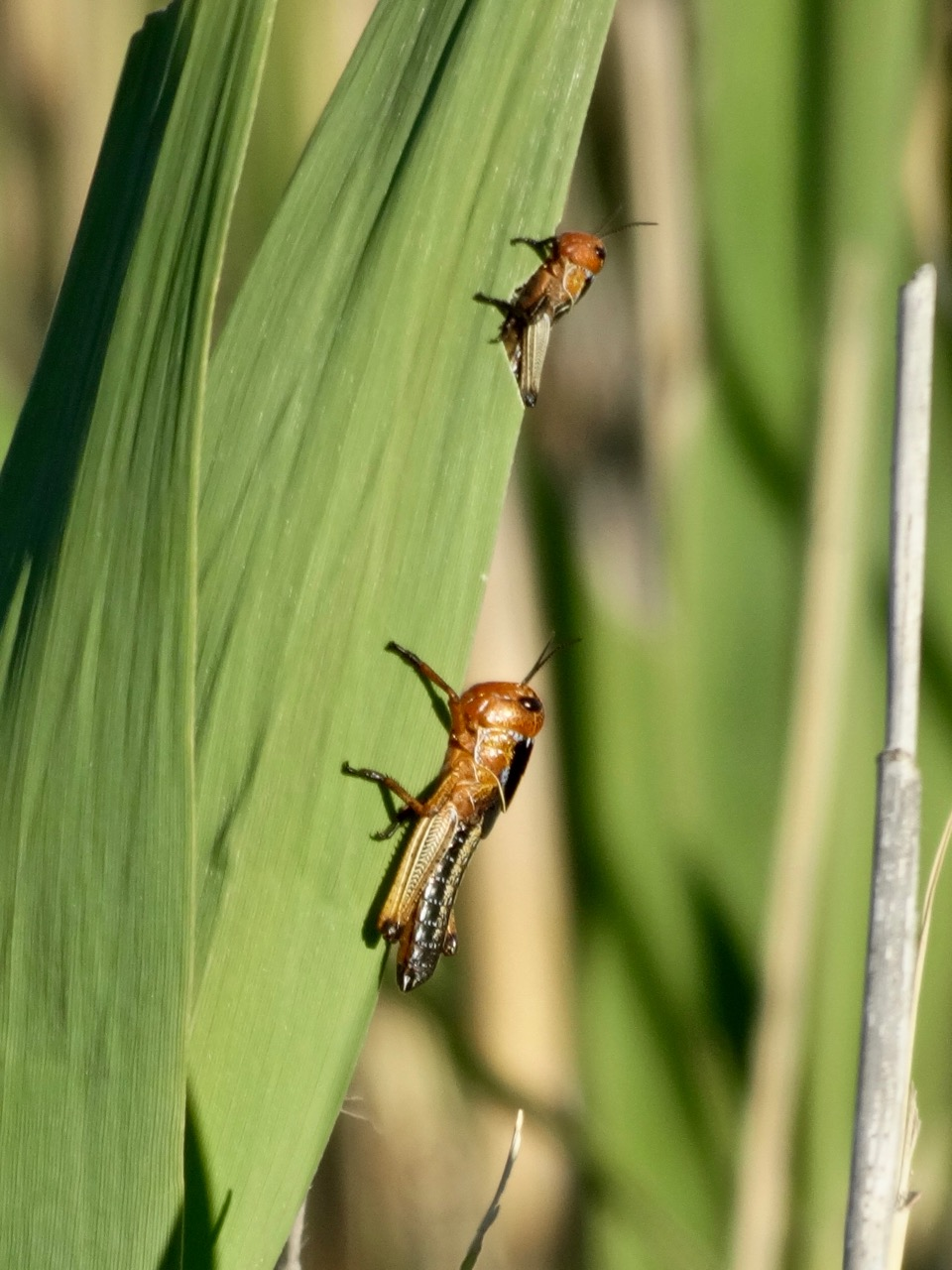
Second and fourth instar nymphs (gregarious)

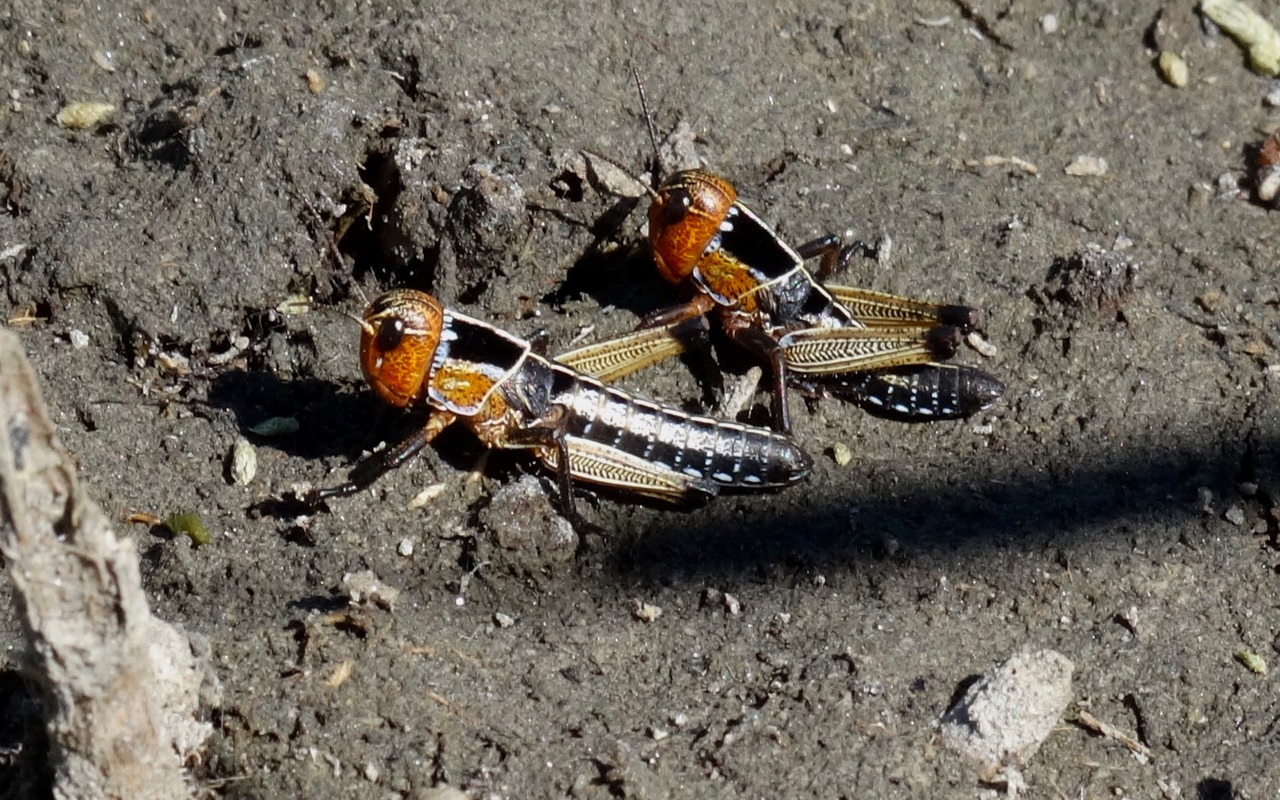
Third instar nymphs (gregarious)

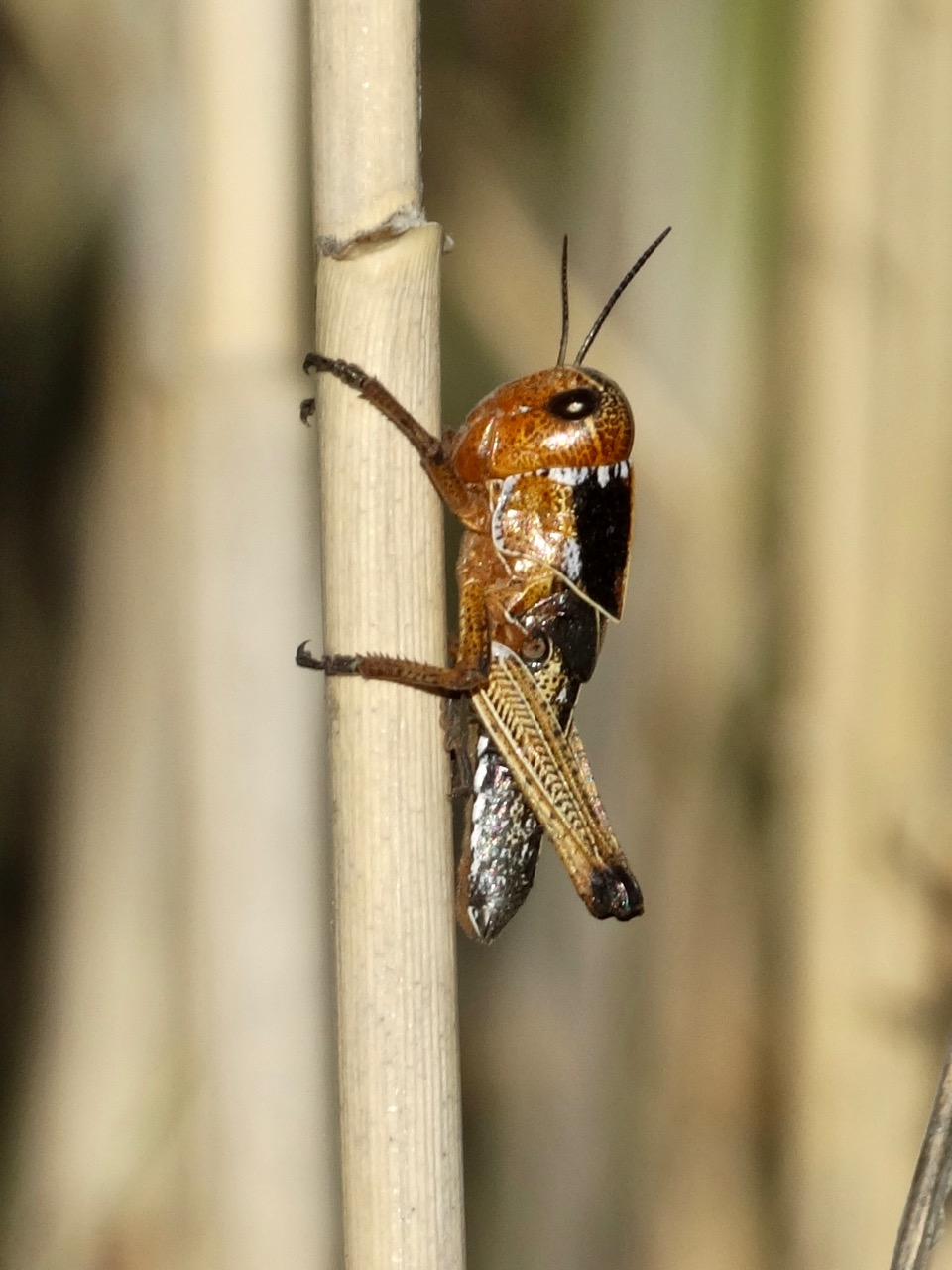
Fourth instar nymph (gregarious)

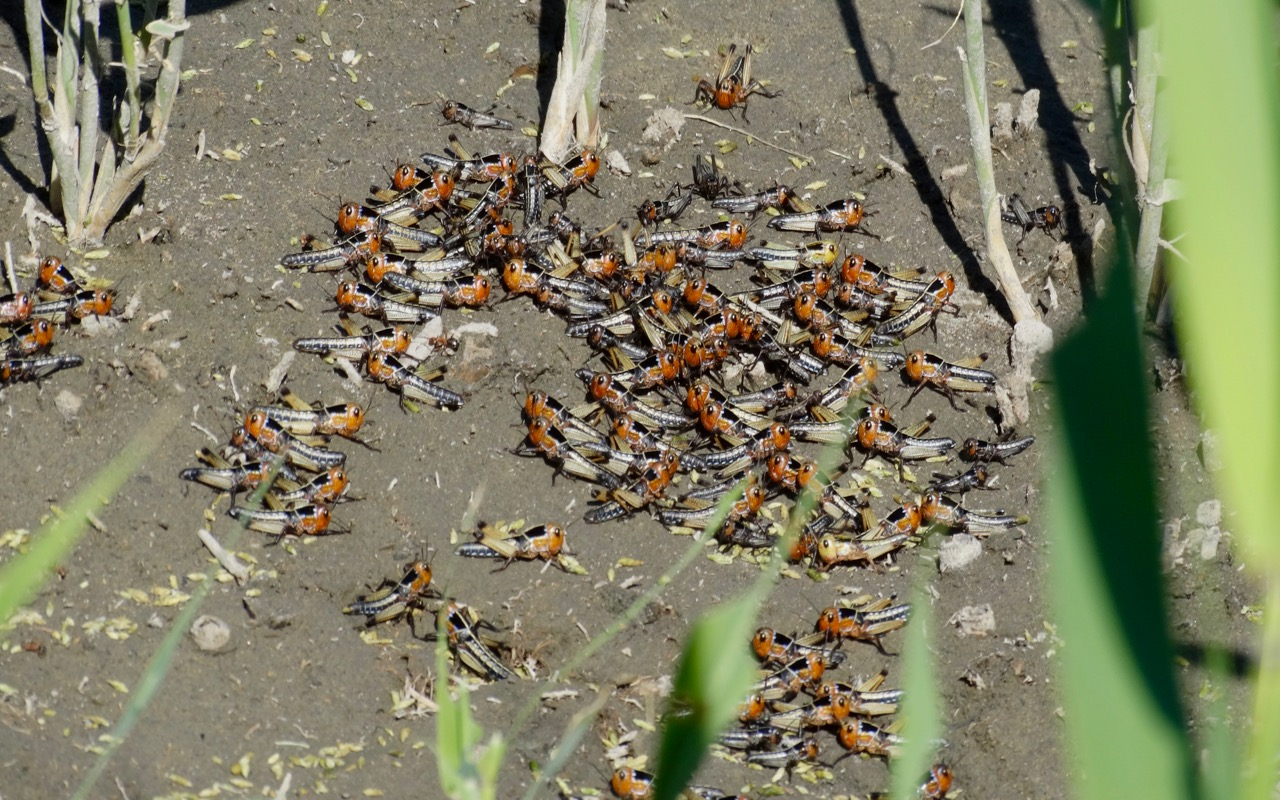
Part of a hopper band in Kazakhstan

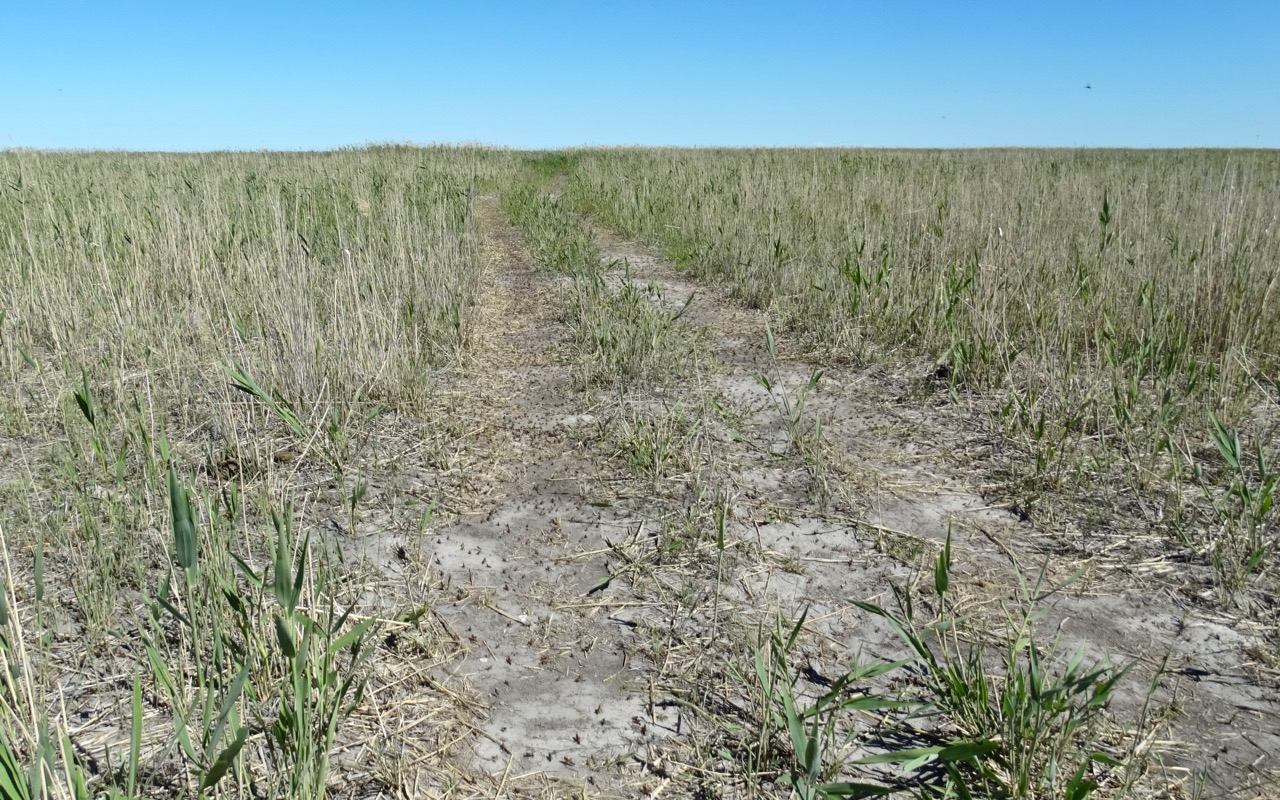
Hopper band in Kazakhstan

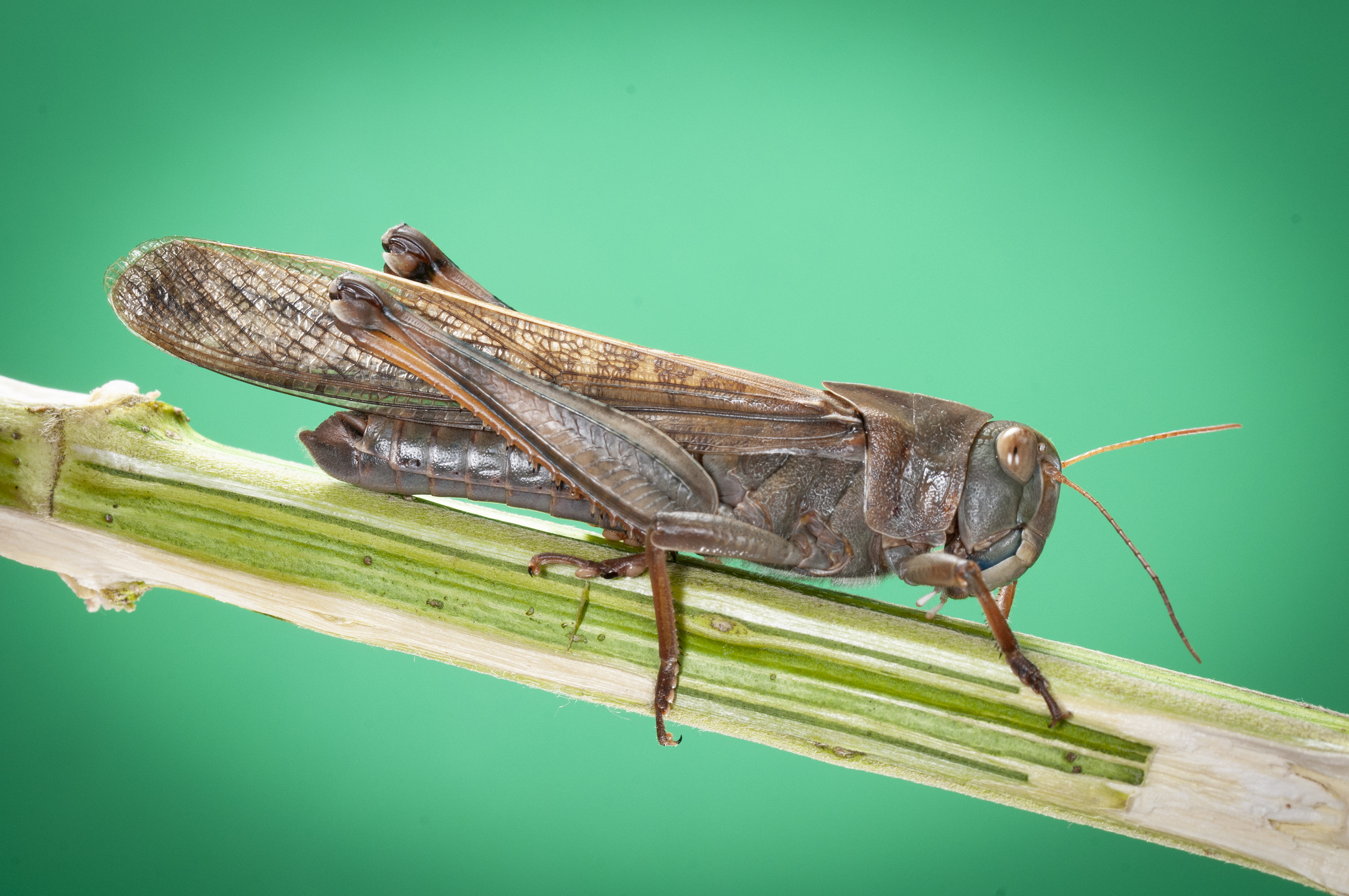
Locusta migratoria migratoria, Adult, Korea, Black Morph

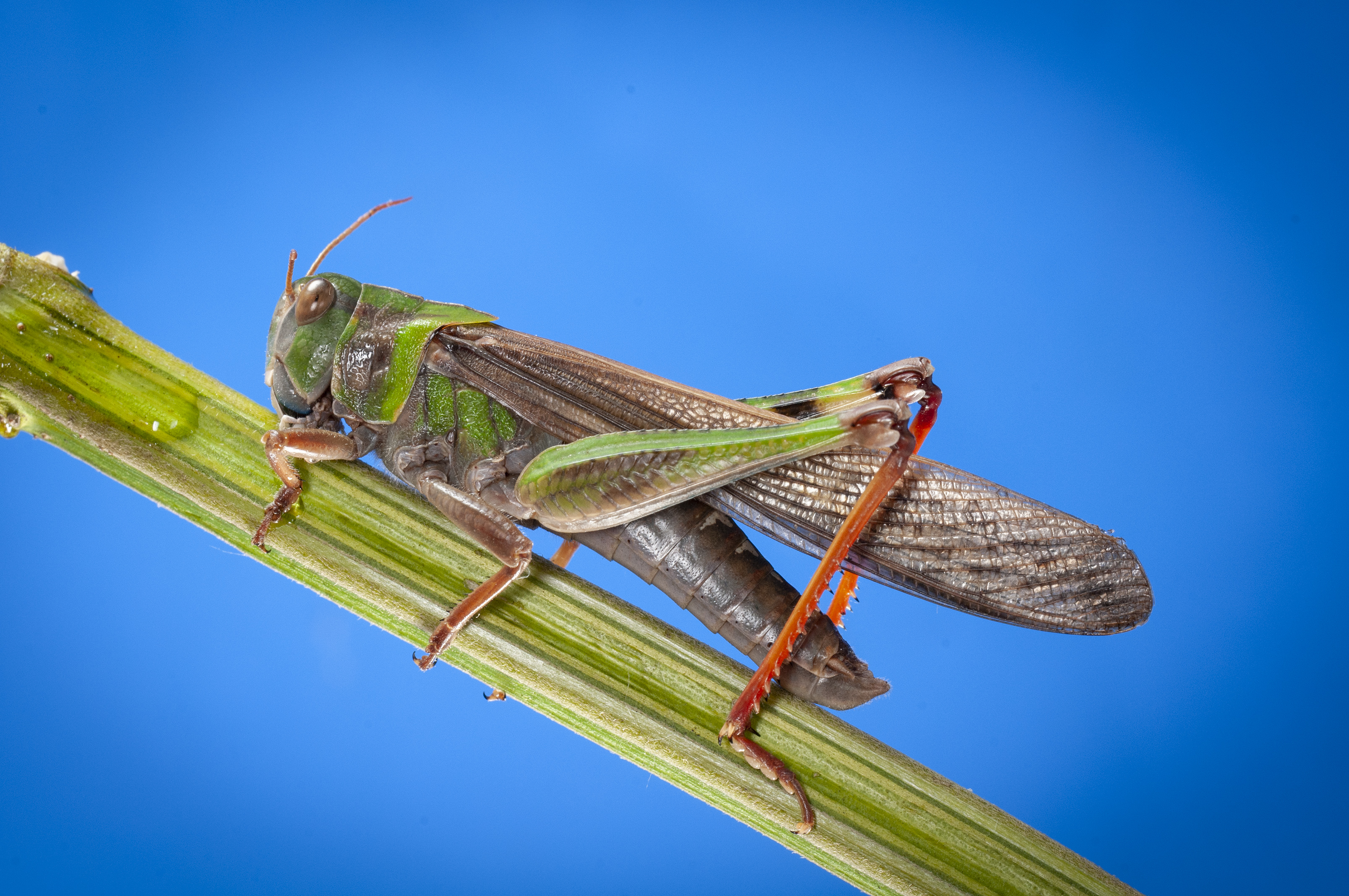
Adult, Korea, typical form

== See also ==
- 2013 Madagascar locust infestation
- Australian Plague Locust Commission (APLC)
