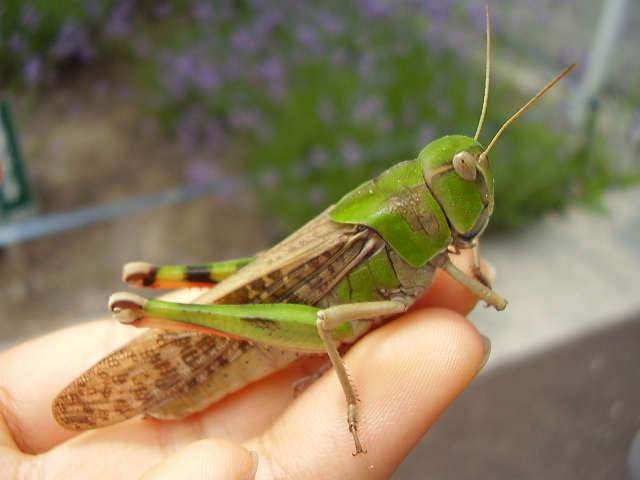
- Solitary phase in Japan

Scientific classification
- Kingdom: Animalia
- Phylum: Arthropoda
- Clade: Pancrustacea
- Class: Insecta
- Order: Orthoptera
- Suborder: Caelifera
- Family: Acrididae
- Genus: Locusta
- Species: L. migratoria
- Subspecies: L. m. manilensis

Trinomial name
- Locusta migratoria manilensis (Meyen, 1835)

= Locusta migratoria manilensis =

Oriental migratory locust

Subspecies of locust

Locusta migratoria manilensis, commonly known as the Oriental migratory locust, is a subspecies of the migratory locust (L. migratoria) in the family Acrididae. It is sufficiently different in size and structure from the African migratory locust to be considered a distinct subspecies of the migratory locust. It is found in southeastern Asia and is an important agricultural pest in the region. It is normally a solitary insect but when conditions are suitable, it enters into a gregarious phase when the young form into bands which move together and the adults into swarms. Although outbreaks may have recently been fewer in number and size because of changes in agricultural practices and better locust detection, the insects remain active as crop pests and the potential for outbreaks is still present.

== Description ==
The Oriental migratory locust is slightly smaller than the African migratory locust. It can exist in two phases, solitary and gregarious. The solitary adults are either green or brown, but as the insects become more crowded together, then brown individuals predominate. The nymphs or hoppers are greyish-brown when they first hatch but their colour changes to either green or brown as they grow, with brown being more common in dry conditions. When their densities increase and they begin to form hopper bands, the colour becomes orangeish-brown or reddish-brown, with black markings.

== Distribution ==
The Oriental migratory locust is found in southeastern Asia. Outbreaks have occurred in western Malaysia, Sabah, eastern China and the Philippines. Plagues of swarming locusts have occurred in these areas and as far away as Thailand, Malaysia, Java, Sulawesi and the southern tip of Japan.

== Life cycle ==
The adult female Oriental migratory locust deposits a number of egg pods in the ground over the course of a few weeks. The sites selected include soft soils such as volcanic ash, alluvial soils and sand. Each pod contains between fifteen and a hundred eggs and most females lay from two to seven pods during the breeding season. The eggs hatch 10 to 24 days later and the nymphs develop through 5 or 6 instars, taking between 26 and 61 days to fully develop. Females do not lay eggs when the temperature is below 21 °C (70 °F), and above this temperature, development times reduces as the temperature rises until 32 °C (90 °F) is reached, after which no further reduction takes place.

Locusts change their behaviour and are attracted to each other when there are large numbers in close proximity. This behaviour starts when the nymphs are quite small and form a band that move together as a cohesive unit. The band of hoppers can travel a distance of up to 4 kilometres (2.5 mi) per day, mostly moving downhill, stopping sporadically to feed and bask in the sun. When the insects are fully developed and have wings, they stay together as a swarm. Solitary adults usually fly by night but gregarious ones fly by day. The new adults mature and become sexually active in three or four weeks. There may be up to five generations per year in the Philippines, but in the cooler parts of China, there may be just one or two.

== Outbreaks ==
Outbreaks tend to originate in two types of habitat; soft flood plains periodically inundated by floodwater and forest clearings. In the latter case, the land is cleared for growing crops but when the soil is exhausted it is abandoned and cultivation moves elsewhere. The grasses and weeds that grow in the clearing provide food for locust nymphs and cultivated areas nearby provide soft soil for mass egg deposition.

A serious outbreak of the Oriental migratory locust occurred in Indonesia in 1997-1998. It was first observed in the provinces of Lampung, South Sumatra and Bengkulu in 1997 and then seemed to disappear. It reappeared early in 1998 and intensified, with nearly 20,000 hectares of rice and 15,000 hectares of maize being affected. It may have been triggered by the drought conditions of 1997.

Outbreaks in China historically occurred about every ten years, usually after dry summers were succeeded by warm winters. The swarms were mostly restricted by the surrounding uplands to the river valleys. Low-lying land that floods intermittently in the delta areas of the Yellow River has been identified as outbreak centres. During the period 2002 to 2006, outbreaks of hopper bands in this locality were biologically controlled with the fungal pathogen Metarhizium acridum by ground and aerial applications, giving a kill rate greater than 90%.

In the Philippines, there were four major plagues in the first half of the twentieth century. They seem to have originated in southern Mindanao around Sarangani Bay. They tended to follow periods of below average rainfall. Since about 1960, the Oriental migratory locust has been less of a problem in the Philippines, probably because cultivation practices have changed and there is less untended grassland where populations can build up undetected.

An outbreak in southern Japan was discovered on an uninhabited island in 1986. A wildfire had restricted the area available to the locusts for feeding and later provided ideal conditions for egg deposition. Hopper bands with a density of 1000 insects per square metre roamed around and swarms of adults occurred over the whole island; the outbreak was brought under control later in the year by spraying.
