= CYP303A1 =

Drosophila melanogaster gene

Cytochrome P450 303A1

Identifiers
- Organism: Drosophila melanogaster
- Symbol: Cyp303a1
- Alt. symbols: CYPCCCIIIA1
- Entrez: 36316
- Orthologs: NCBI: entry; OMA: entry
- UniProt: Q9V399

Other data
- EC number: 1.14.-.-
Search for
- Structures: Swiss-model
- Domains: InterPro

CYP303A1 (ORF Name: Dmel_CG4163) is an insect gene belongs to the cytochrome P450 family, first found in Drosophila melanogaster, highly expressed in pupal stage. Its ortholog also found in Locusta migratoria.
