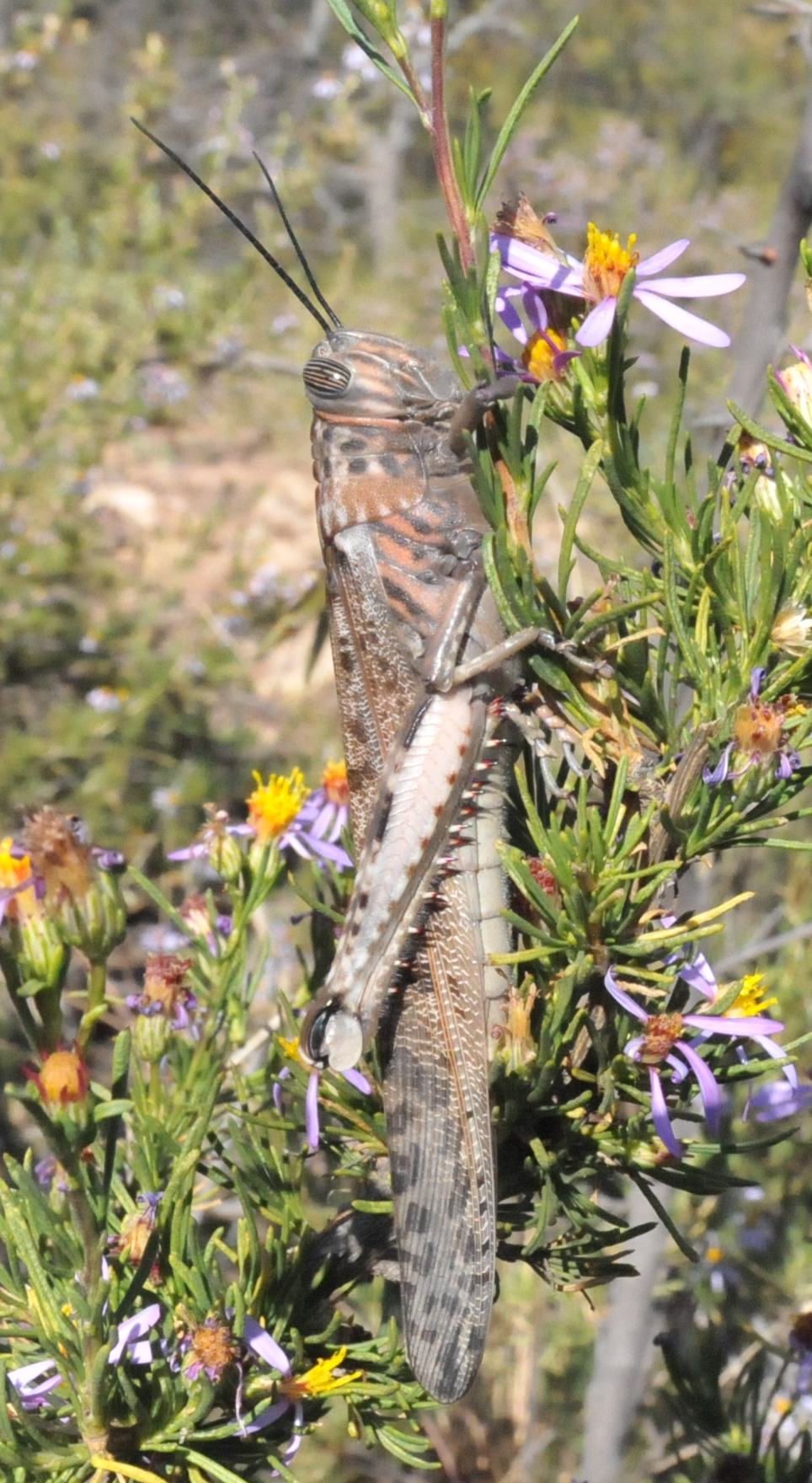
- Adult perched on a Felicia shrub

Scientific classification
- Kingdom: Animalia
- Phylum: Arthropoda
- Class: Insecta
- Order: Orthoptera
- Suborder: Caelifera
- Family: Acrididae
- Subfamily: Cyrtacanthacridinae
- Tribe: Cyrtacanthacridini
- Genus: Anacridium
- Species: A. moestum

Binomial name
- Anacridium moestum (Serville, 1838)

Synonyms
- Acridium moestum Serville, 1838; Acridium tataricum moestum Serville, 1838; Anacridium moestum moestum (Serville, 1838); Orthacanthacris moesta (Serville, 1838)

= Anacridium moestum =

Camouflaged tree locust

Species of grasshopper

Anacridium moestum, the camouflaged tree locust, is a species of grasshopper belonging to the family Acrididae, that is native to Africa south of the equator. It is similar in appearance to the Southern African desert locust, Schistocerca gregaria flaviventris. It is likewise brownish, large and slender, but mostly arboreal in its habits.

== Description ==
Anacridium moestum can reach a length of 50–90 millimetres (2.0–3.5 in). These large and slender locusts show a mottled reddish brown or grey body, with a finely speckled green tegmina. Hind wings are pale blue with a black band near the base. Hind tibiae are purplish. Nymphs (hoppers) are yellowish green. The eyes and face are vertically striped.

== Distribution and habitat ==
This species is native and widespread in southern and south tropical Africa. These grasshoppers live on trees or shrubs in grassland with acacias.

== Biology ==
Anacridium moestum feeds on Acacia, Zizyphus, Capparis aphelia, and gum trees. These tree locusts may damage crops and fruit trees, but only occasionally swarm.

== Bibliography ==
- Burr (1903) Orthoptera Fam. Eumasticidae, Genera Insectorum, V. Verteneuil & L. Desmet, Brussels 15:1-23, pl 1
- COPR (Centre for Overseas Pest Research) (1982), The Locust and Grasshopper Agricultural Manual
- Dirsh (1965), The African Genera of Acridoidea, Cambridge University Press, Antilocust Centre, London 579 pp.
- Johnsen (1991) Acrididae: Catantopinae, Cyrtacanthacridinae, Acridinae, The Acridoidea of Botswana (Acridoidea of Botswana) 2:132-284
- Johnston, H.B. (1956), Annotated catalogue of African grasshoppers, The Cambridge University Press, Cambridge 833 pp.
- Johnston, H.B. (1968), Annotated catalogue of African grasshoppers, The Cambridge University Press, Cambridge Suppl:448 pp.
- Kirby, W.F. (1910), A Synonymic Catalogue of Orthoptera (Orthoptera Saltatoria, Locustidae vel Acridiidae), British Museum (Natural History), London 3(2):674 pp.
- Picker, Griffiths & Weaving (2005), Field Guide to Insects of Southern Africa, Struik Publishers, South Africa 444 pp.
- Rehn, J.A.G. (1942) New South African Bird-Locust of the Genus Anacridium (Orthoptera, Acrididae, Cyrtacanthacridinae), Notulae Naturae 110
- Rehn, J.A.G. (1944) South African bird-locust records and notes (Orthoptera, Acrididae, Cyrtacanthacridinae, group Cyrtacanthacres), Notulae Naturae 137:11 pp.
- Serville (1838[1839]), Histoire naturelle des insectes. Orthoptères, Librairie Encyclopédique de Roret, Paris i-xviii, 1-776, pl. 1-14
- Uvarov & G.B. Popov (1957) The saltatorial Orthoptera of Socotra, Zoological Journal of the Linnean Society, London (Zool. J. Linn. Soc.) 43:359-389
- Uvarov (1923) A revision of the Old World Cyrtacanthacrini (Orthoptera, Acrididae). II. Genera Phyxacra to Willemsea, Annals and Magazine of Natural History, London (Ann. Mag. nat. Hist.) 9 11:473-490
- Uvarov (1966), Grasshoppers & Locusts. A Handbook of General Acridology, Cambridge University Press, London 1:481 pp.
