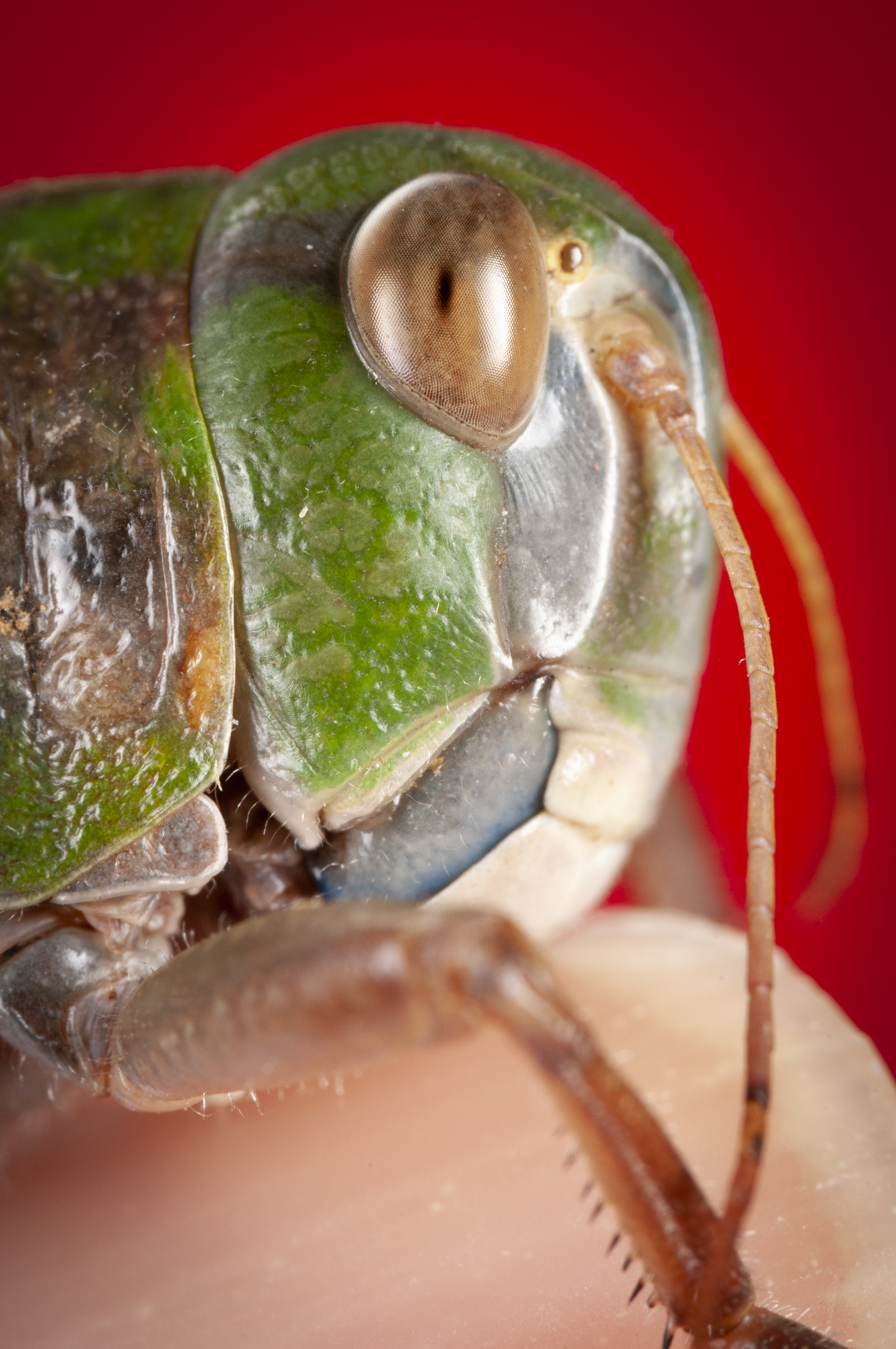
- Head Detail
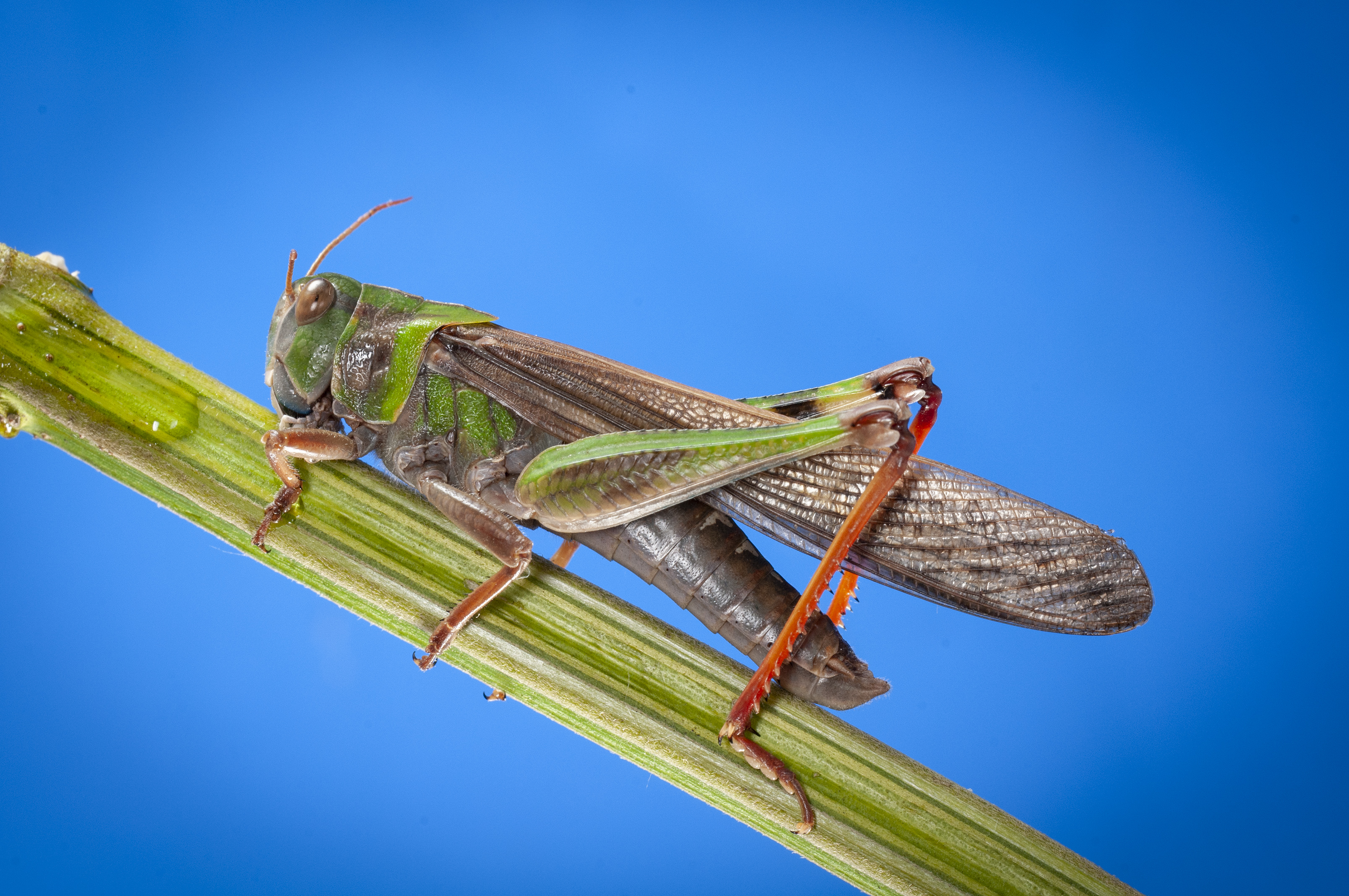
- Typical form, Adult, Korea

Scientific classification
- Kingdom: Animalia
- Phylum: Arthropoda
- Clade: Pancrustacea
- Class: Insecta
- Order: Orthoptera
- Suborder: Caelifera
- Family: Acrididae
- Genus: Locusta
- Species: L. migratoria
- Subspecies: L. m. migratoria

Trinomial name
- Locusta migratoria migratoria (Linnaeus, 1758)

= Locusta migratoria migratoria =

Subspecies of locust

Locusta migratoria migratoria is a subspecies of the migratory locust (L. migratoria) in the family Acrididae.

== Description ==
Locusta migratoria migratoria, the nominate subspecies, is characterized by its robust body and significant sexual dimorphism in size. In the Korean Peninsula, adult females are typically larger, measuring between 45 and 65 mm (1.8 and 2.6 in), while males range from 35 to 52 mm (1.4 to 2.0 in) in body length. They exhibit a green or light brown coloration with a distinct longitudinal ridge on the pronotum. Their tegmina (forewings) are long, transparent, and marked with irregular dark spots, providing effective camouflage. The cranial structure and compound eye patterns, often featuring vertical stripes, are key morphological identifiers for this subspecies.

== Distribution and phylogeny ==
This subspecies is widely distributed across the northern Palearctic realm, including the Korean Peninsula, Northern China, and Japan. Recent molecular research based on 65 complete mitochondrial genomes has revised the global taxonomy of the species, recognizing L. m. migratoria as the dominant northern lineage inhabiting the temperate regions of the Eurasian continent. Genetic analysis of specimens from South Korea confirms their affiliation with this Northern lineage, distinct from the Southern lineages found in Africa and Southern Asia.

== Ecology and behavior ==
In Korea, this subspecies is most active from July to October, inhabiting sunny grasslands and riverbanks. It exhibits phase polyphenism, transitioning between solitary (solitaria) and gregarious (gregaria) forms. A significant modern outbreak of the gregarious phase was scientifically recorded in Haenam, South Jeolla Province, in August 2014, marking a rare instance of mass migration in the region.

== Gallery ==
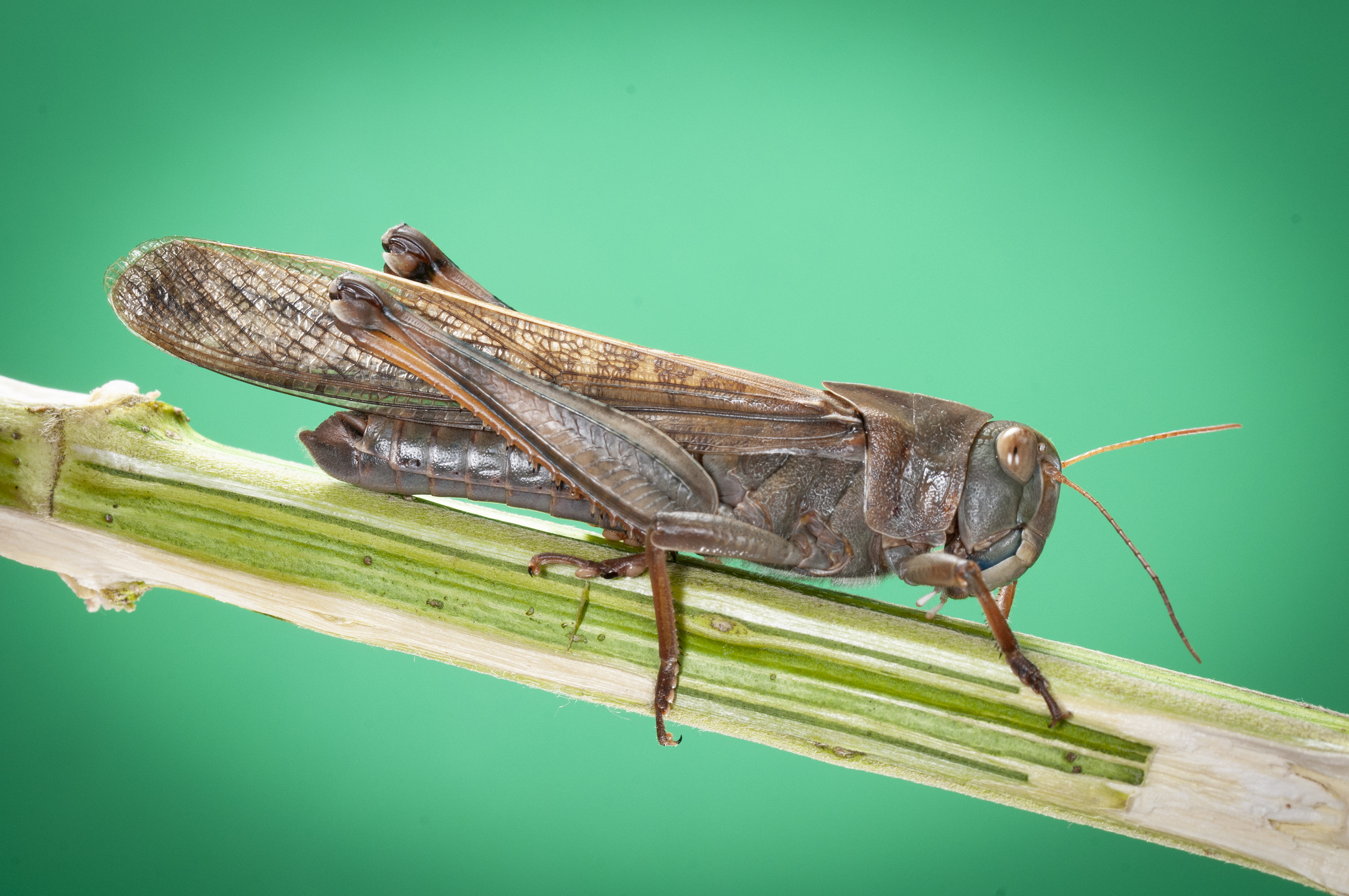
Locusta migratoria migratoria, Adult, Black Morph
