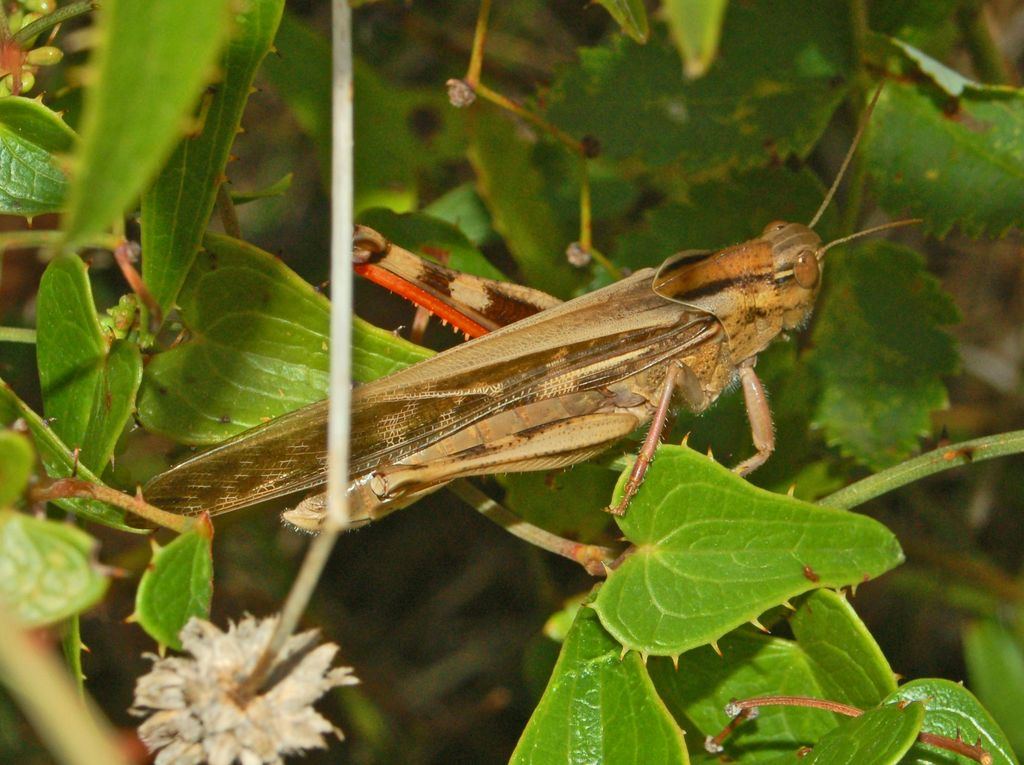
- Locusta migratoria cinerascens, male
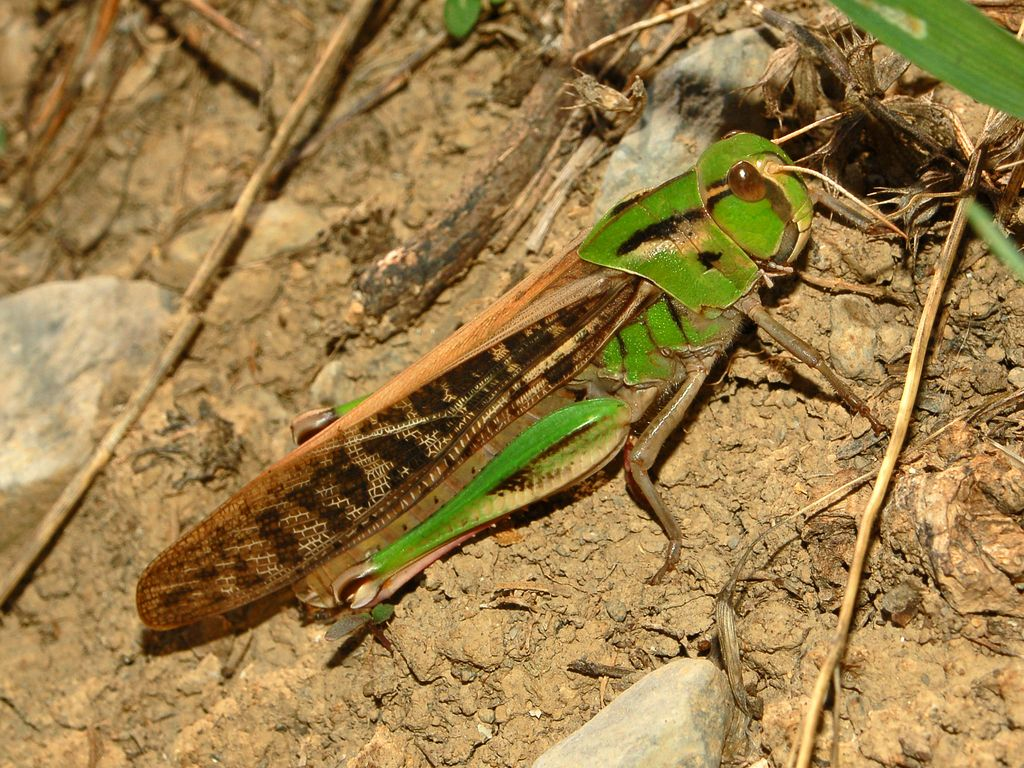

Scientific classification
- Kingdom: Animalia
- Phylum: Arthropoda
- Clade: Pancrustacea
- Class: Insecta
- Order: Orthoptera
- Suborder: Caelifera
- Family: Acrididae
- Genus: Locusta
- Species: L. migratoria
- Subspecies: L. m. cinerascens

Trinomial name
- Locusta migratoria cinerascens (Fabricius, 1781)

Synonyms
- Locusta cinerascens Fabricius, 1781

= Locusta migratoria cinerascens =

Subspecies of locust

Locusta migratoria cinerascens is a subspecies of the migratory locust (L. migratoria) in the family Acrididae.

== Distribution ==
This species is present in Italy and Spain.

== Bibliography ==
- Fontana, Buzzetti, Cogo & Odé. 2002. Guida al riconoscimento e allo studio di cavallette, grilli, mantidi e insetti affini del Veneto: Blattaria, Mantodea, Isoptera, Orthoptera, Phasmatodea, Dermaptera, Embidiina 432 - Locusta migratoria cinerascens
- Herrera. 1982. Ser. Entomol. 22:77 - Locusta migratoria cinerascens
- Rakotondrainibe K, Nicolas G, Fuzeau-Braesch S. Phase morphometric differences among Locusta migratoria cinerascens, Locusta migratoria migratorioides, and their mutant albinos (Orthoptera)
- Suzel Fuzeau-Braesch, Gerard Nicolas, Jean-Claude Baehr, Patrick Porcheron A study of hormonal levels of the locust Locusta migratoria cinerascens artificially changed to the solitary state by a chronic CO2 treatment of one minute per day
