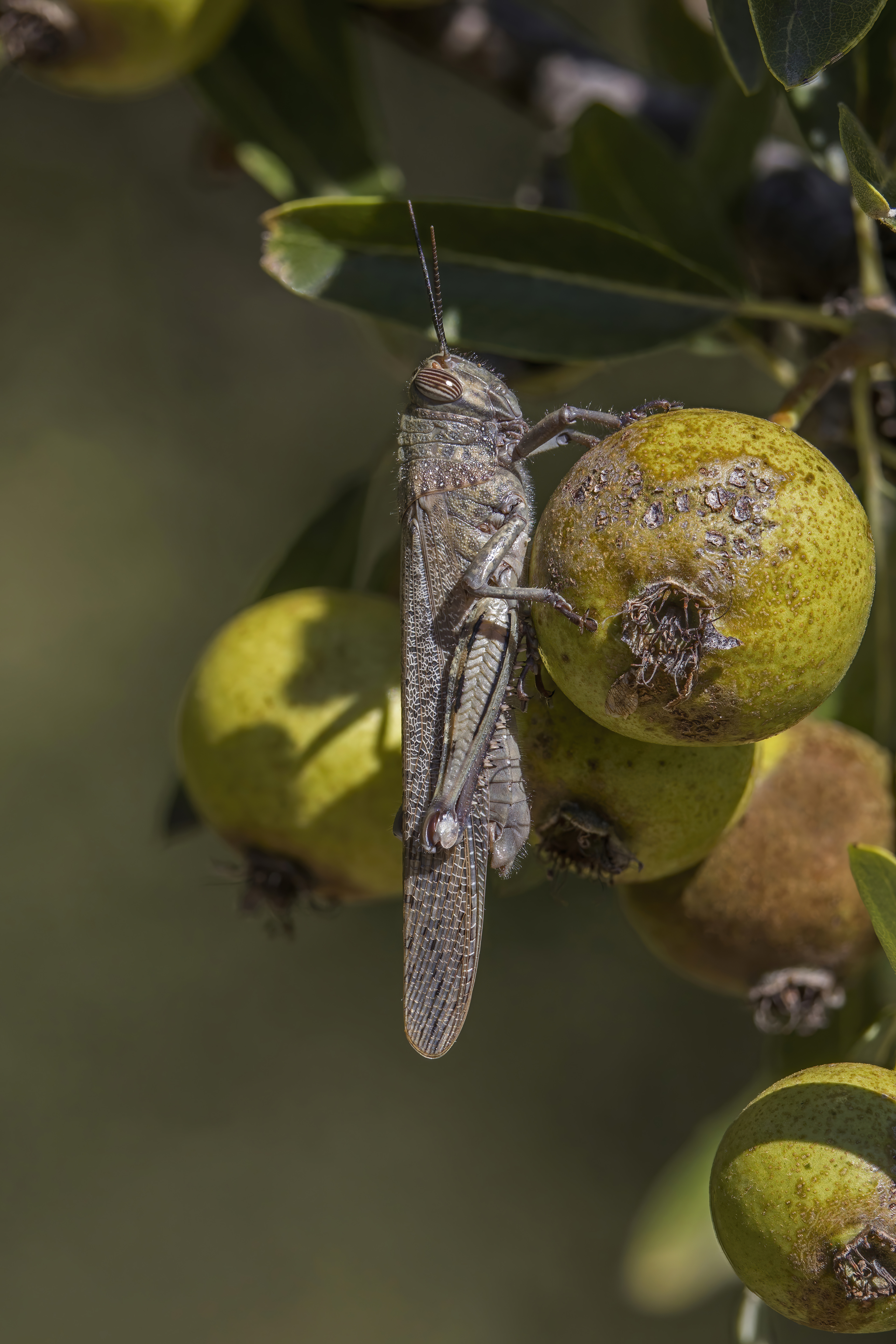

Scientific classification
- Kingdom: Animalia
- Phylum: Arthropoda
- Class: Insecta
- Order: Orthoptera
- Suborder: Caelifera
- Family: Acrididae
- Subfamily: Cyrtacanthacridinae
- Tribe: Cyrtacanthacridini
- Genus: Anacridium
- Species: A. aegyptium

Binomial name
- Anacridium aegyptium (Linnaeus, 1758)
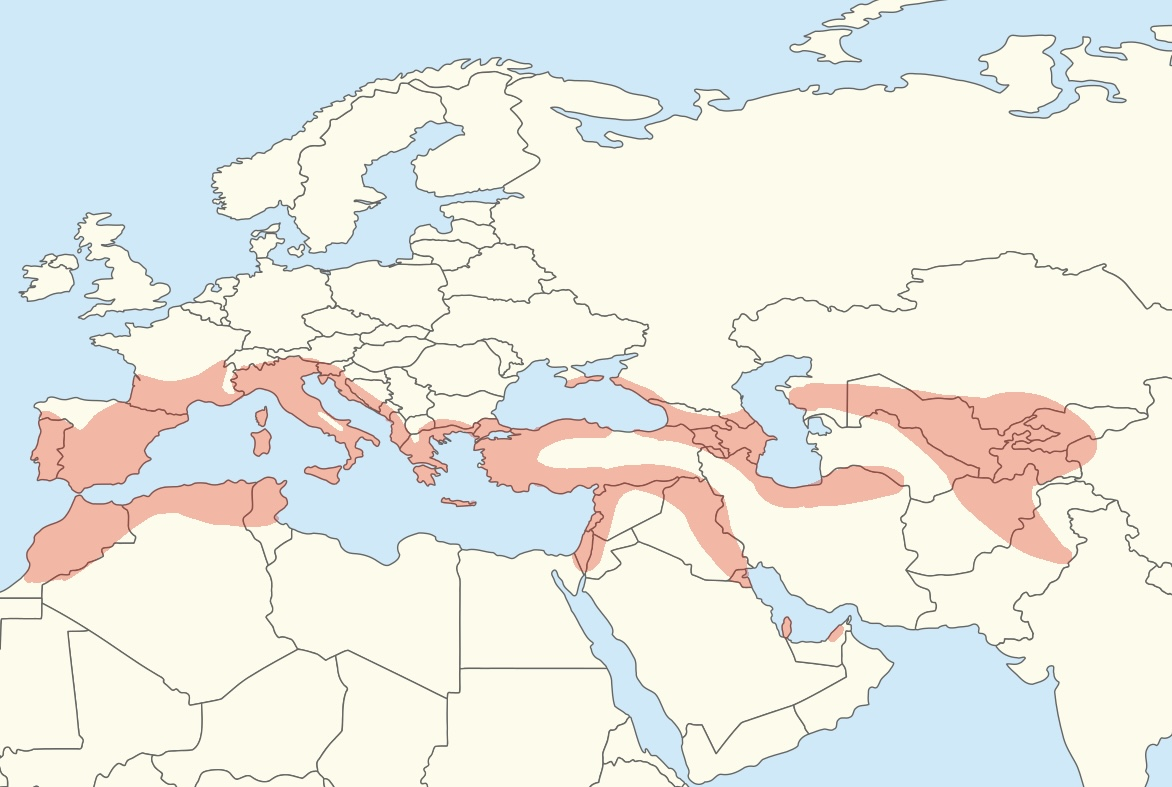

Synonyms
- List: Acridium aegyptiums (Linnaeus, 1758); Acridium albidiferum (Walker, 1870); Acridium indecisum (Walker, 1870); Acridium lineola; Flamiruizia stuardoi Liebermann, 1943; Gryllus aegyptium Linnaeus, 1764; Gryllus lineola Fabricius, 1781; Gryllus nubecula Thunberg, 1815; Orthacanthacris aegyptia (Linnaeus, 1764)

= Anacridium aegyptium =

Species of grasshopper

Anacridium aegyptium, the Egyptian grasshopper or Egyptian locust, is a species of insect belonging to the subfamily Cyrtacanthacridinae.

== Subspecies ==
- Anacridium aegyptium var. rubrispinum Bei-Bienko, 1948 - Anacridium rubrispinum Bei-Bienko, 1948

== Distribution ==
A fairly common species, the Egyptian grasshopper is present in most of Europe, the Afrotropical realm, eastern Palearctic realm, the Near East, and North Africa, and has recently been observed in Cape Town, South Africa.

== Habitat ==
These grasshoppers inhabit trees and shrubs, scrub land, maquis, and orchards in warm and bright environments, at an elevation from sea level to 1,500 m.

== Description ==
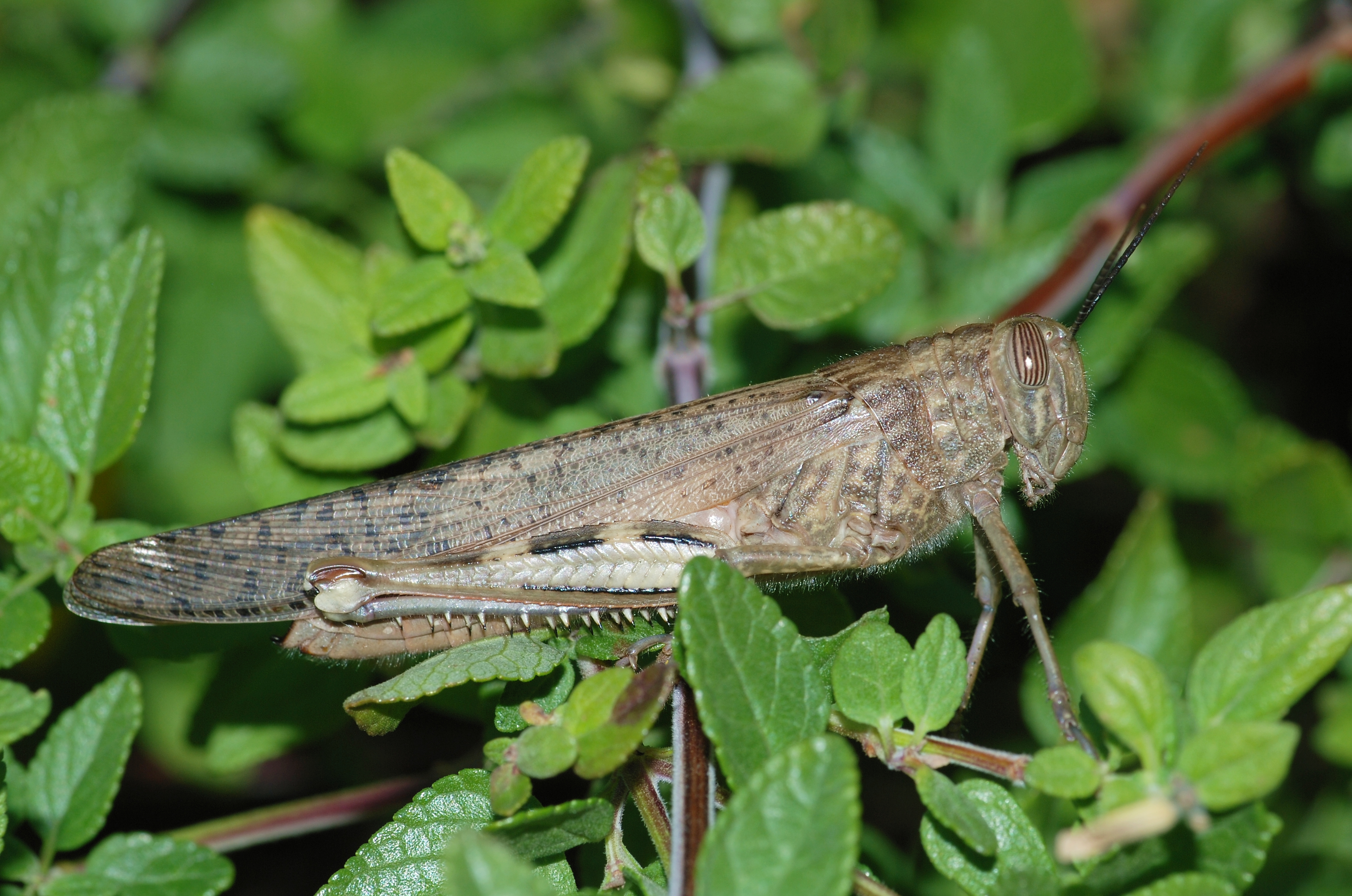

Anacridium aegyptium is one of the largest European grasshoppers. Adult males grow up to 30–56 mm (1.2–2.2 in) long, while females reach 46–70 mm (1.8–2.8 in) in length. Their bodies are usually gray, brown, or olive-coloured, and their antennae are relatively short and robust. The tibiae of the hind legs are blue, while the femora are orange. The hind femora have characteristic dark marks. They are also easily identified by their characteristic eyes, which have vertical black and white stripes. Their pronota show a dorsal orange stripe and several small white spots. The wings are clear with dark marks.

== Biology ==
This species is a folivore, essentially feeding on leaves of various plants. It is a solitary species, harmless to crops. Adults are mainly seen in August and September, but they are active throughout the year. After mating, these grasshoppers overwinter as adults. Spawning occurs in spring just under the soil surface and the nymphs appear in April. These grasshoppers undergo several molts. Nymphs differ from adults in appearance; their color varies from yellow to bright green and ocher and the wings are absent or small, as they are gradually developed after each molt.

== Gallery ==
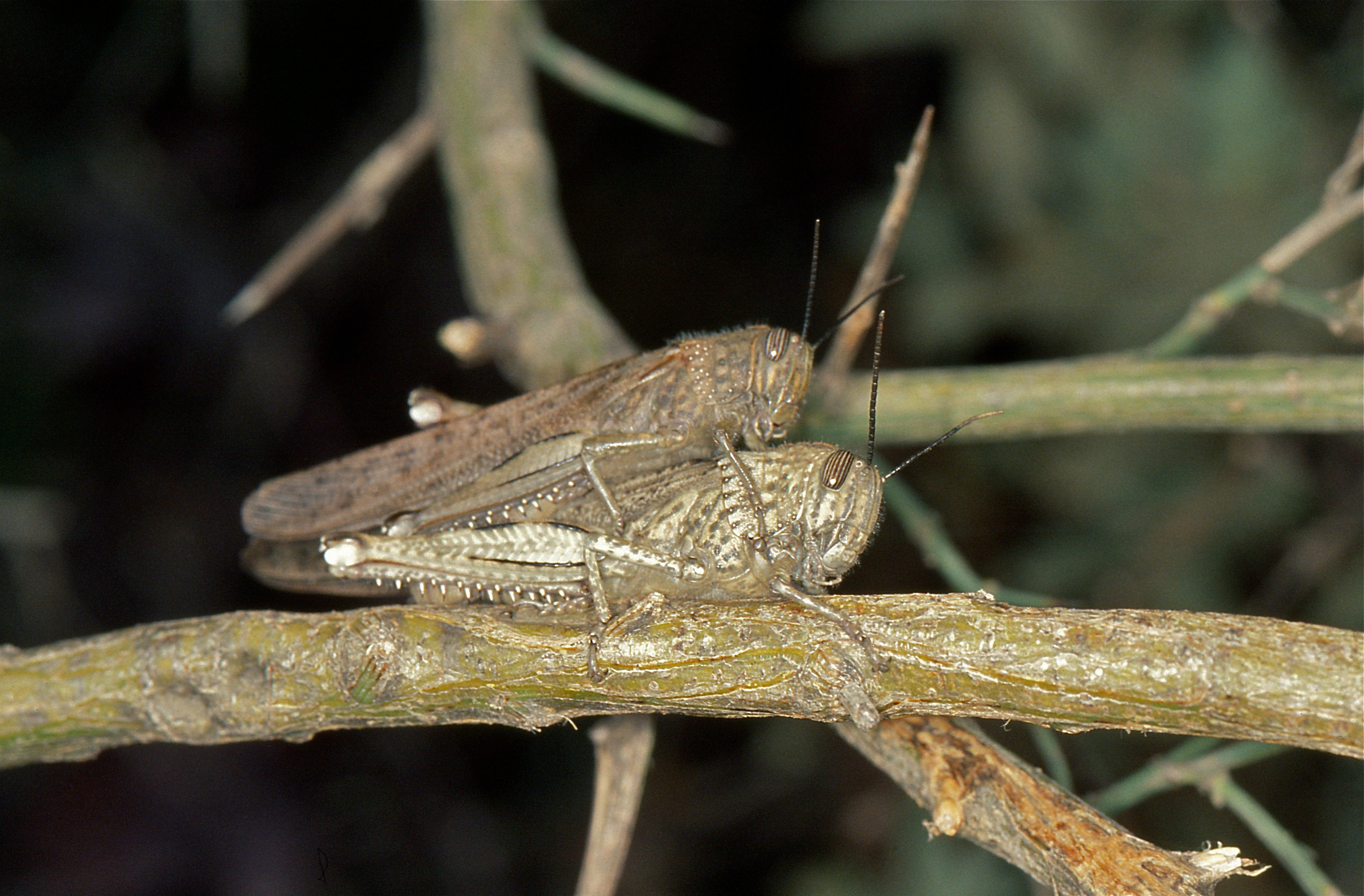
Mating pair

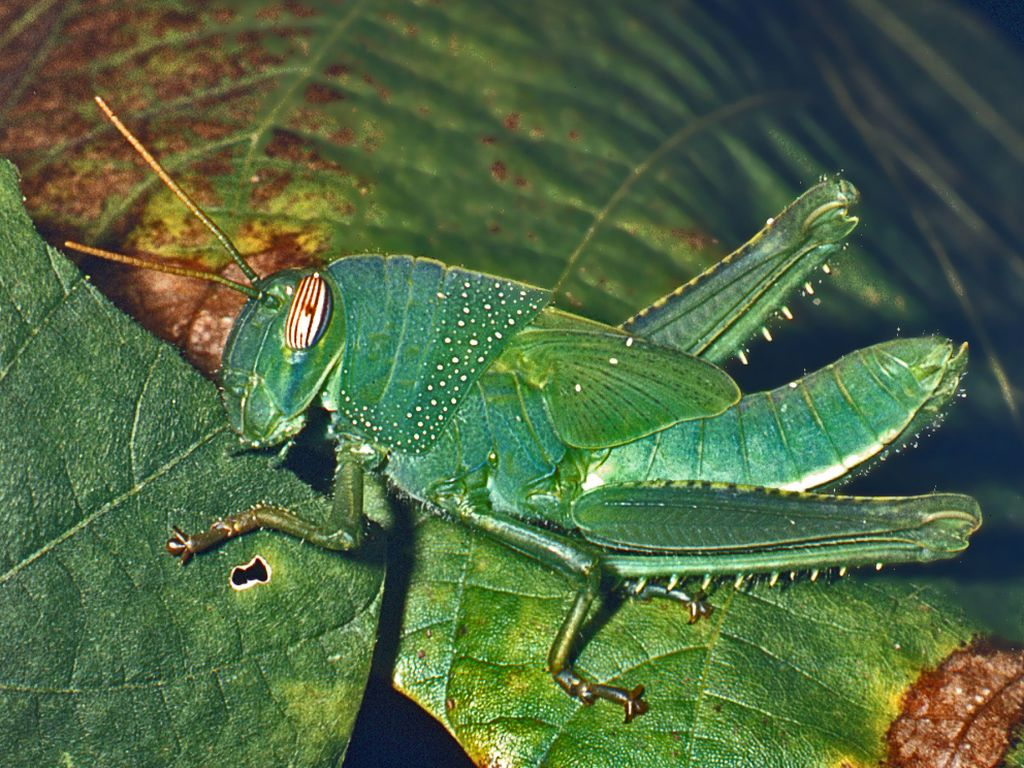
Nymph showing typical juvenile wings

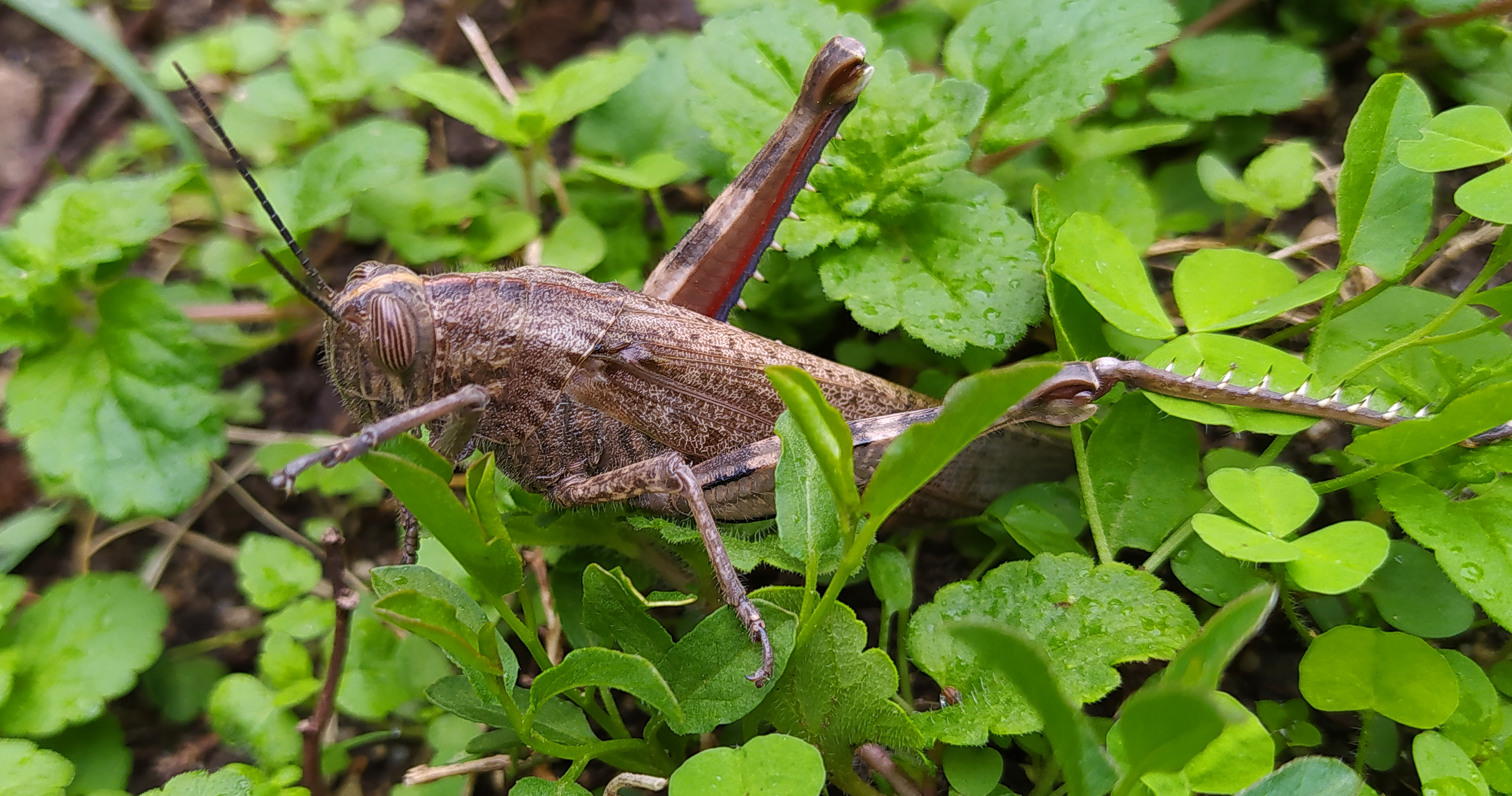
Female adult, 10 cm. (El Escorial, Spain)

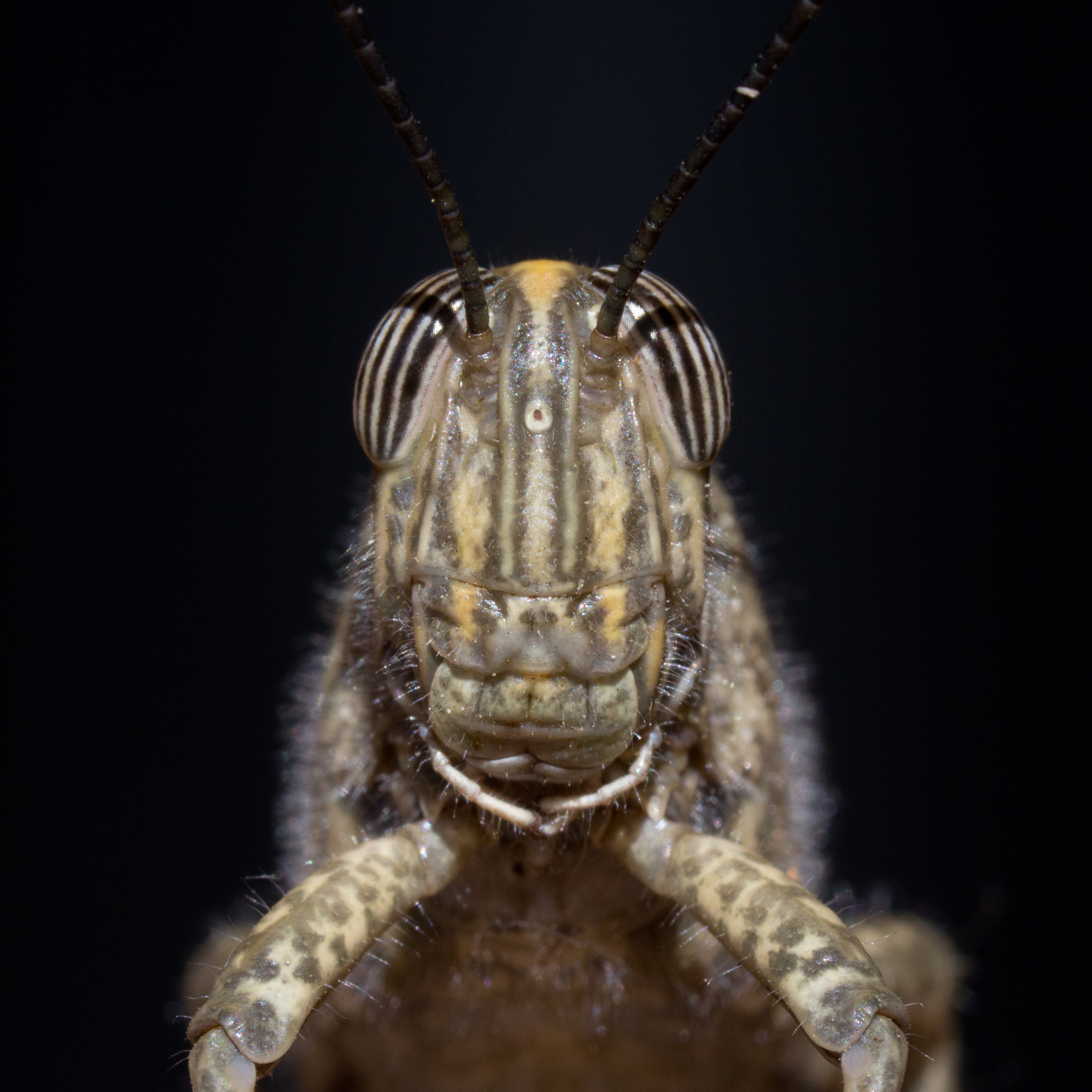
Adult eyes, close view

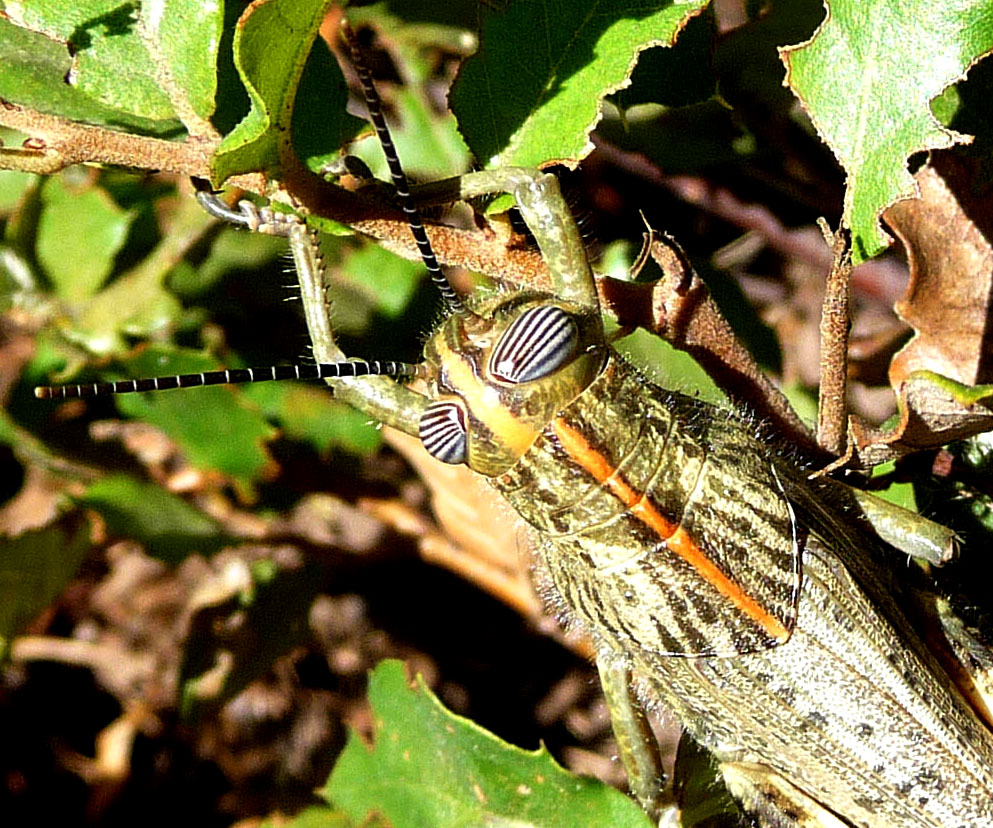
Adult detail of pronotum

Clip of A. aegyptium feeding on leaves
