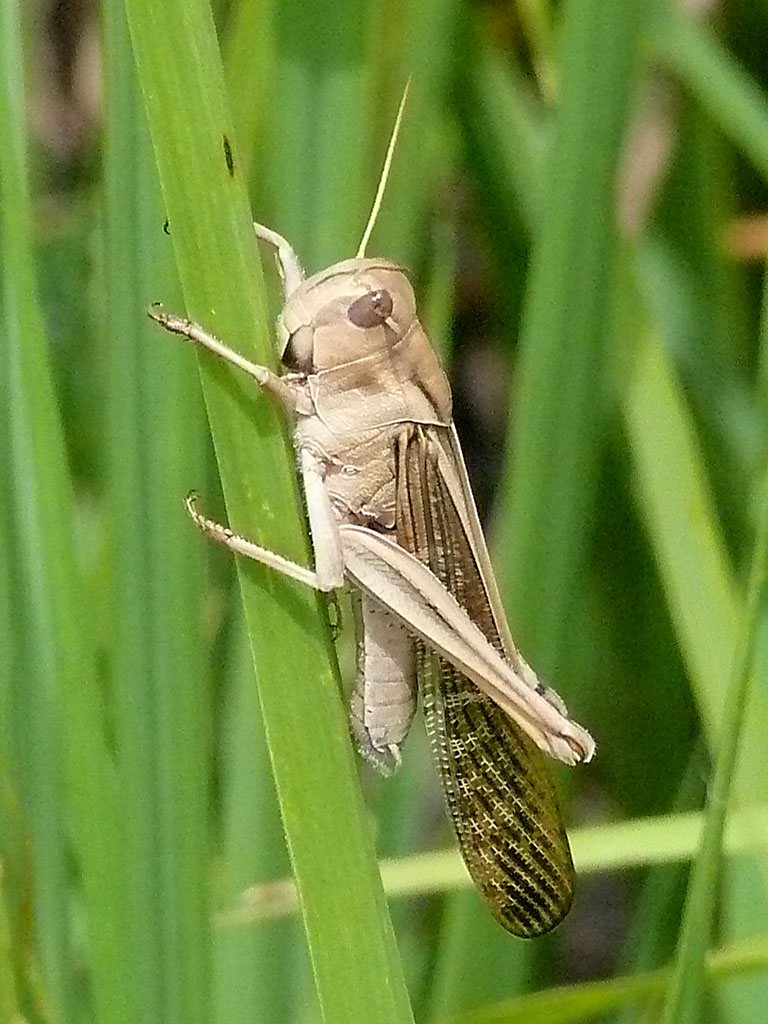
- Solitary adult male in Tanzania

Scientific classification
- Kingdom: Animalia
- Phylum: Arthropoda
- Clade: Pancrustacea
- Class: Insecta
- Order: Orthoptera
- Suborder: Caelifera
- Family: Acrididae
- Genus: Locusta
- Species: L. migratoria
- Subspecies: L. m. migratorioides

Trinomial name
- Locusta migratoria migratorioides (Fairmaire & L.J. Reiche, 1849)

= African migratory locust =

Subspecies of locust

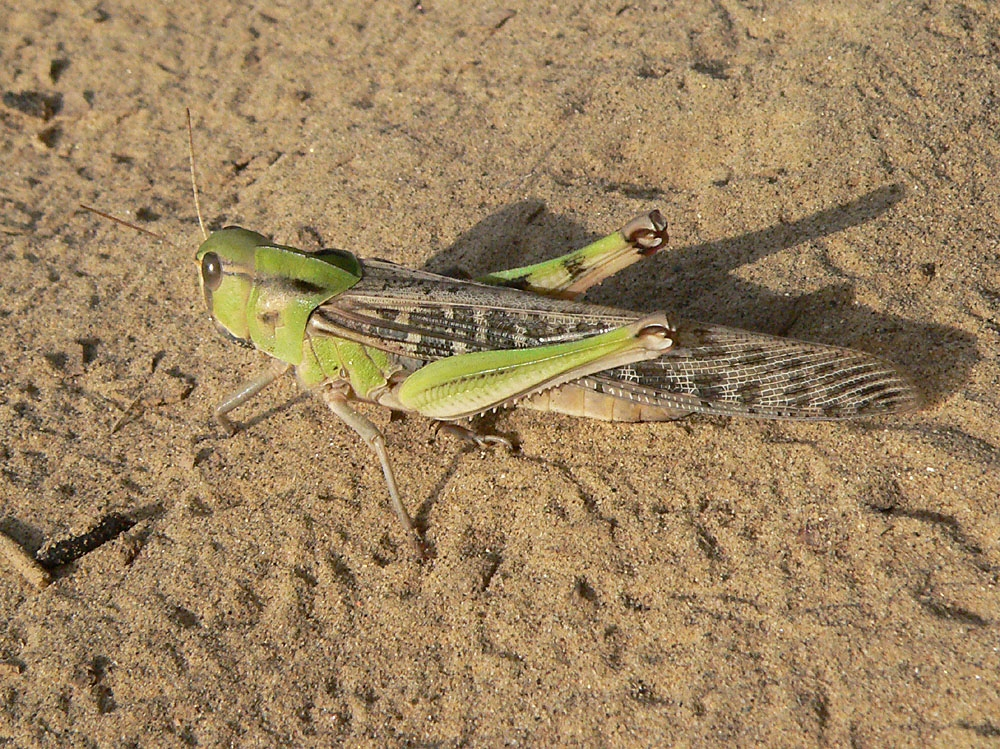
Solitary adult female in Sudan

Locusta migratoria migratoria recording

Locusta migratoria migratorioides, commonly known as the African migratory locust, is a subspecies of the migratory locust in the family Acrididae.

It occurs in most of Africa south of the Sahara Desert, but its main breeding ground, and the original source of most plagues, is on the floodplains of the Niger River in West Africa. Much of the time, this locust adopts a solitary lifestyle, but under certain conditions, it becomes gregarious; the young nymphs, known as hoppers, form bands that move together and the adult insects form swarms that may reach plague proportions. Plagues of this locust took place from 1891 to 1903 and again from 1928 to 1941. After many years without outbreaks of the insects, further plagues occurred in the last two decades of the 20th century.

== Description ==
The African migratory locust has two phases, a solitary one, where the insects behave independently, and a gregarious phase, where they gather together and act as a cohesive unit. Adult insects differ morphologically between the two phases; solitary insects have an arched prothorax, the foremost segment of the thorax, and are either green or brown, darkening in colour as they mature (especially the abdomen of the female). Gregarious insects have a flatter prothorax and are a pale tan or a greyish colour with dark markings. As they mature, they become duller in appearance and the males may become more yellowish.

The hoppers are also different in the two phases. The newly hatched solitary hopper is grey, but later stages can be a variety of colours including green, buff, brown, red, grey, and black. Their colouring tends to match their surroundings, so on new, young foliage they are green and after wildfires they may be black. The gregarious hoppers are boldly marked in a pattern of brown and black.

== Lifecycle ==
Eggs are laid in soft, moist soil. This can be burnt land wet by recent rain and with a flush of new growth, recently flooded land, open areas in the vicinity of swamps, cleared farmland, and cattle-denuded pastures. The eggs are laid in up to three pods over a period of days or weeks. The pods of a solitary insect contain about 65 eggs, while those of a gregarious female average 39. The egg pods have a coating of foam to which sand particles adhere, forming a surrounding membrane. Some chemical factor in the foam produced by gregarious females encourages aggregation of the hoppers; if eggs are removed from the pod and reared separately, they develop into solitary individuals. The eggs take 10 to 100 days to hatch, depending on conditions.

The hoppers usually develop through five stages, known as instars, separated by moults, but in the solitary phase, six or seven instars may occur in very dry conditions. The duration of each instar depends on environmental factors and is shortest in hot, humid regions and longest under cooler, dry conditions. The newly moulted adult is at first immature and does not start to breed immediately. Males can copulate after about four days and solitary females start laying around 10 days, but for gregarious females, the delay in maturation is 2.5 to 3.0 weeks. If conditions are unsuitable for egg-laying, the eggs may be reabsorbed.

== Ecology ==
The African migratory locust primarily feeds on grasses, including economically important crops, such as maize, millet, sorghum, and wheat.

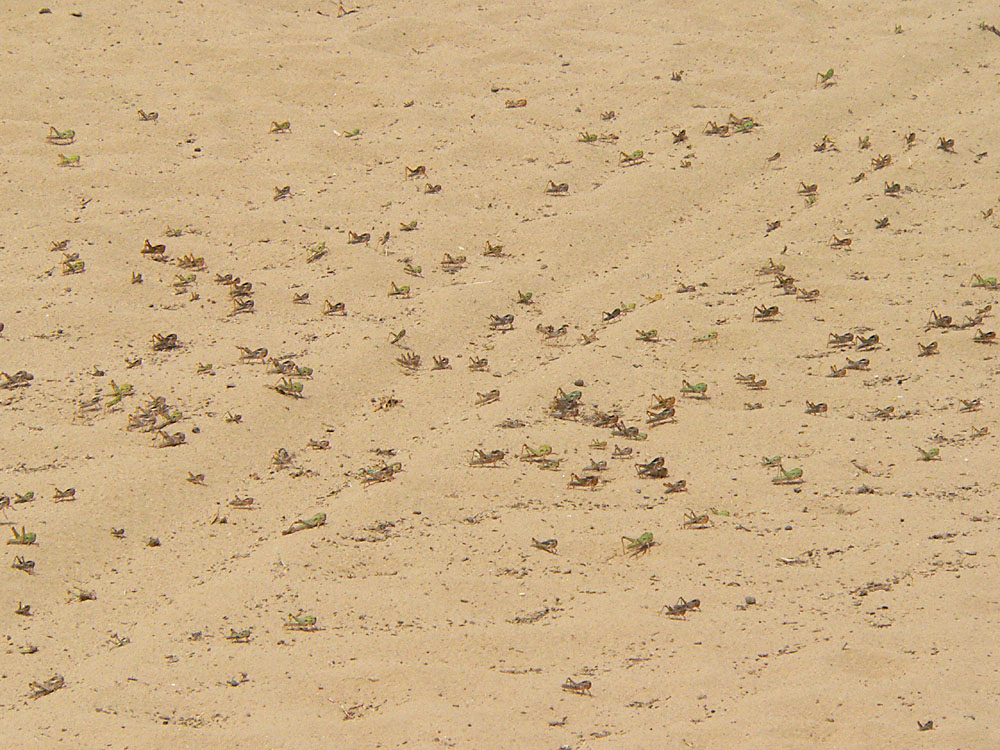
Hopper band in Sudan

The African migratory locust exists in its solitary form in many parts of Africa and its development is then similar to that of other grasshopper species. When the eggs hatch in extremely close proximity to each other, the first-instar hoppers become attracted to each other and begin to form bands that move in synchrony. The band moves as a cohesive unit, pausing as the hoppers feed and bask in the sun, and merges with other bands. Bands have been known to travel for 24 km (15 mi) before they metamorphose into adults. The attraction between the individual hoppers continues into adulthood and the insects continue to act as a cohesive group, a swarm.

Swarms of the African migratory locusts fly by day and settle on the ground at night, where they rest and feed on vegetation. After sunrise, they warm themselves in the sun before taking to the air again. They often settle for a while in the middle of the day, but do not normally feed much at this time. If the day is cloudy or cold, they may not fly at all. The swarm tends to adopt a stratiform shape with a dense, rounded leading edge and more dispersed trailing edge. It can be extremely dense and tends to move downwind. African migratory locusts travel closer to the ground than desert locusts and do not usually cover large distances.

Rains in the mountains to the southwest of the Niger floodplain produce flooding in its upper parts from August to October, and that is where outbreaks occur after the floods recede. Lower down the river, the flooding occurs later, from about November to February. As these floods recede, further land covered with tall, coarse grasses is available for the insects to breed. While the river is in flood, the locusts migrate to the Sahel, where further breeding takes place.

== Locust control organisations ==
The International African Migratory Locust Organization (OICMA) was founded in 1955. Its aim was to "exercise continuous surveillance and preventive control of the African migratory locust in the outbreak area on the River Niger, destroy concentrations of the locust, carry out research and develop means of control." This control was effective, and increasing dryland farming and better monitoring in Mali changed the character of the outbreak area such that by the 1980s, the insect's behaviour was thought to be more like that of a solitary grasshopper than a gregarious locust. OICMA was dissolved in 1986.

== Plagues ==
A major plague of the African migratory locust occurred from 1891 to 1903, followed by one that lasted from 1928 to 1941. For many years after that, the African migratory locust was in recession, which perhaps lulled the authorities into a false sense of security. The Sahel region experienced several years of drought in the late 1970s and early 1980s. The rains and more normal weather returned in 1984, providing ideal conditions for the locusts to breed abundantly. The African migratory locust, as well as the Senegalese grasshopper, the red locust, the brown locust, and the desert locust were flourishing in various parts of the continent at the same time. The Desert Locust Control Organisation of East Africa remained an effective body, but elsewhere little monitoring was done, with civil wars in Chad and the Central African Republic hindering the detection of outbreaks. In many countries, few resources were available to deal with any outbreaks that were discovered. This plague lasted until 1986.

Outbreaks can originate from other parts of Africa, and in 1992, at the same time as a plague of desert locusts was affecting much of North Africa, an outbreak of the African migratory locust took place in Ethiopia and northern Somalia.
