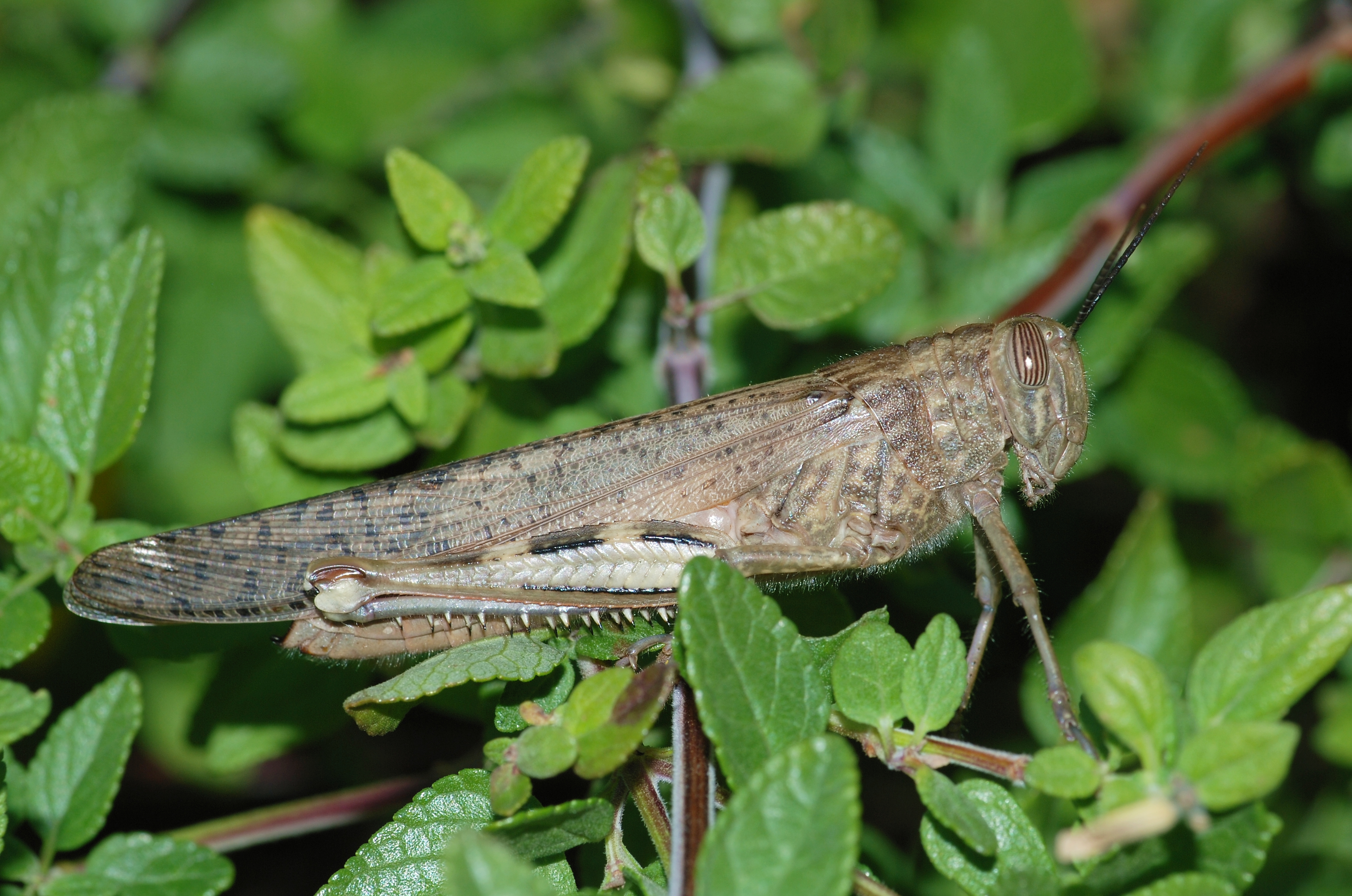
- Anacridium aegyptium

Scientific classification
- Kingdom: Animalia
- Phylum: Arthropoda
- Clade: Pancrustacea
- Class: Insecta
- Order: Orthoptera
- Suborder: Caelifera
- Family: Acrididae
- Subfamily: Cyrtacanthacridinae
- Tribe: Cyrtacanthacridini
- Genus: Anacridium; Uvarov, 1923

Synonyms
- Flamiruizia Liebermann, 1943

= Anacridium =

Genus of grasshoppers

Anacridium is a genus of "tree locusts" or "bird grasshoppers" belonging to the subfamily Cyrtacanthacridinae.

== Species ==
The Orthoptera Species File lists:

- Anacridium aegyptium (Linnaeus, 1764) - type species (as Gryllus aegyptium L.)
- Anacridium burri Dirsh & Uvarov, 1953
- Anacridium deschauenseei Rehn, 1941
- Anacridium eximium (Sjöstedt, 1918)
- Anacridium flavescens (Fabricius, 1793)
- Anacridium illustrissimum (Karsch, 1896)
- Anacridium incisum Rehn, 1942
- Anacridium javanicum Willemse, 1932
- Anacridium melanorhodon (Walker, 1870)
- Anacridium moestum (Serville, 1838)
- Anacridium rehni Dirsh, 1953
- Anacridium rubrispinum Bey-Bienko, 1948
- Anacridium wernerellum (Karny, 1907)
