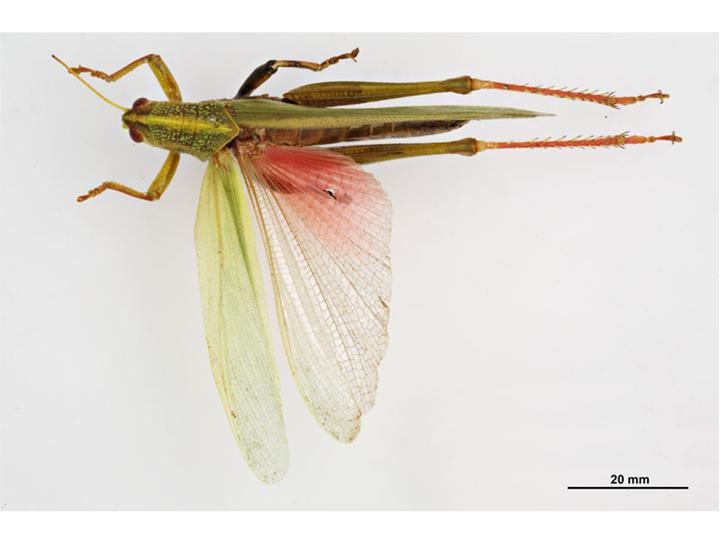
- Chondracris rosea

Scientific classification
- Kingdom: Animalia
- Phylum: Arthropoda
- Class: Insecta
- Order: Orthoptera
- Suborder: Caelifera
- Family: Acrididae
- Tribe: Cyrtacanthacridini
- Genus: Chondracris; Uvarov, 1923

= Chondracris =

Genus of grasshoppers

Chondracris is a genus of grasshoppers in the subfamily Cyrtacanthacridinae erected by Boris Uvarov in 1923. Species records are distributed throughout Asia: from India, southern China, Korea, Japan, Indo-China and Java.

== Species ==
The Orthoptera Species File lists the following (other species have now been placed in the genus Ritchiella):

1. Chondracris bengalensis Mungai, 1992
2. Chondracris rosea (De Geer, 1773) - type species (as Acrydium roseum De Geer)

Note: a third species Chondracris capensis remains nomen dubium.
