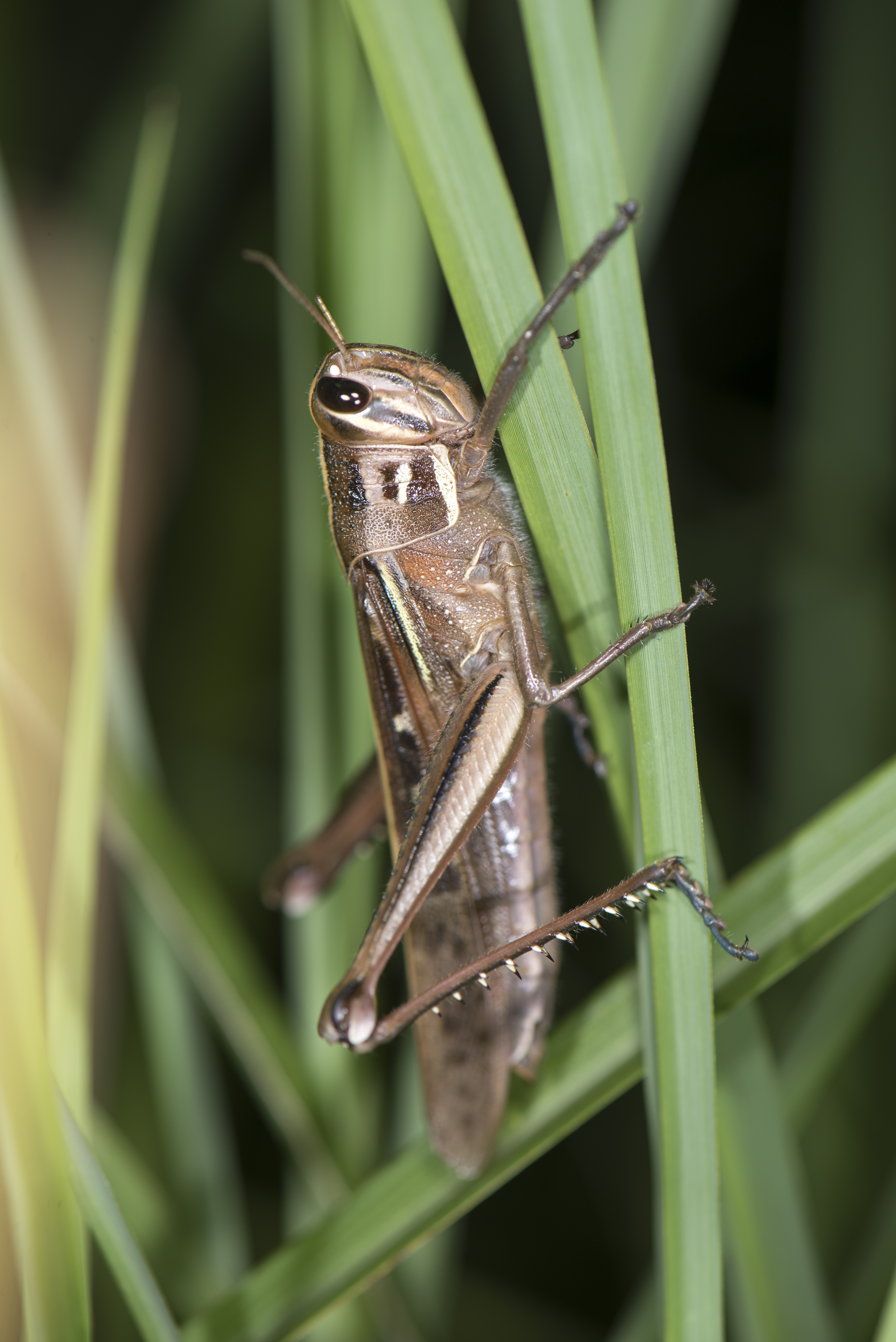
- Bombay locust, Patanga succincta

Scientific classification
- Domain: Eukaryota
- Kingdom: Animalia
- Phylum: Arthropoda
- Class: Insecta
- Order: Orthoptera
- Suborder: Caelifera
- Family: Acrididae
- Subfamily: Cyrtacanthacridinae
- Tribe: Cyrtacanthacridini
- Genus: Patanga; Uvarov, 1923

Type species
- Gryllus succinctus Johannson, 1763

= Patanga (grasshopper) =

Genus of grasshoppers

Patanga is a genus of grasshoppers in the subfamily Cyrtacanthacridinae. Species are distributed throughout Asia: from India, China, Japan, Indochina and western Malesia. The genus was named by Boris Uvarov in 1923, with the type species the economically significant Bombay locust, which has also been placed in genus Nomadacris.

== Species ==
As of 2022, the Orthoptera Species File lists:

1. Patanga apicerca Huang, 1982 — China
2. Patanga avis Rehn & Rehn, 1941 — Philippines
3. Patanga humilis Bi, 1986 — Tibet
4. Patanga japonica (Bolívar, 1898) — India, Vietnam, Korea, Japan (poss. incomplete)
5. Patanga luteicornis (Serville, 1838) — Java
6. Patanga succincta (Johannson, 1763) — India, SE Asia, Japan
