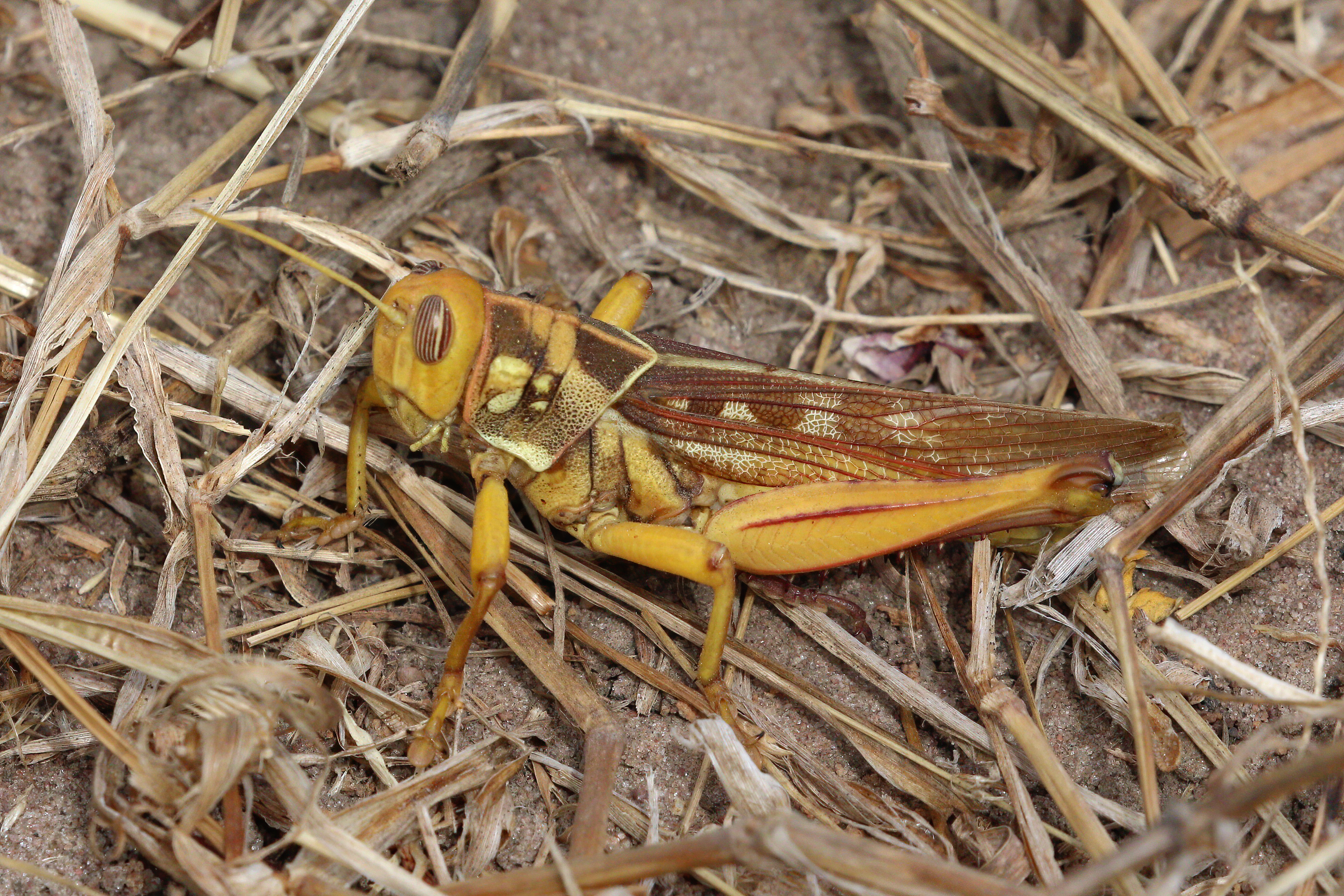
- K. angulifera, Senegal

Scientific classification
- Kingdom: Animalia
- Phylum: Arthropoda
- Class: Insecta
- Order: Orthoptera
- Suborder: Caelifera
- Family: Acrididae
- Subfamily: Cyrtacanthacridinae
- Genus: Kraussaria; Uvarov, 1923

Type species
- Cyrtacanthacris prasina Walker, 1870

Synonyms
- Appressalia Sjöstedt, 1932

= Kraussaria =

Genus of grasshoppers

Kraussaria is a genus of grasshoppers in the subfamily Cyrtacanthacridinae with species found in Africa.

== Species ==
The following species are recognised in the genus Kraussaria:

- Kraussaria angulifera (Krauss, 1877)
- Kraussaria corallinipes (Karsch, 1896)
- Kraussaria deckeni Kevan, 1955
- Kraussaria dius (Karsch, 1896)
- Kraussaria prasina (Walker, 1870)
