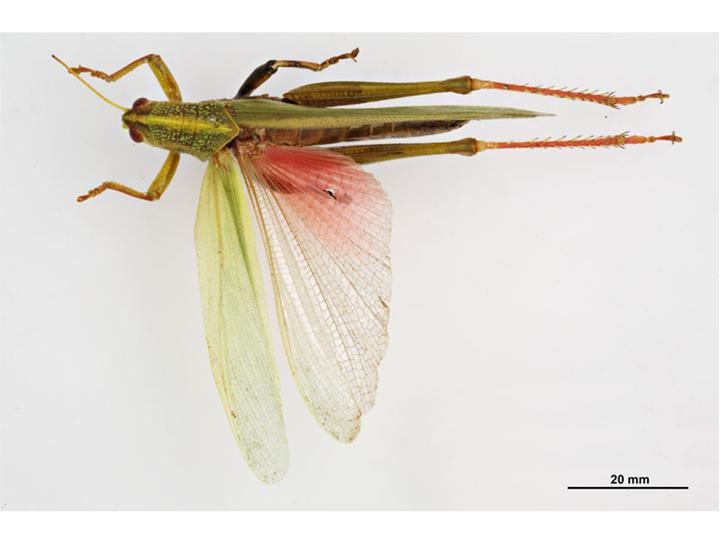
- Chondracris rosea

Scientific classification
- Kingdom: Animalia
- Phylum: Arthropoda
- Clade: Pancrustacea
- Class: Insecta
- Order: Orthoptera
- Suborder: Caelifera
- Family: Acrididae
- Genus: Chondracris
- Species: C. rosea

Binomial name
- Chondracris rosea (De Geer, 1773)

Synonyms
- Chondracris rosea brunneri Uvarov, 1924; Chondracris rosea rosea (De Geer, 1773); Gryllus flavicornis Fabricius, 1787; Cyrtacanthacris lutescens Walker, 1870

= Chondracris rosea =

Species of grasshopper

Chondracris rosea is a species of large grasshopper in the subfamily Cyrtacanthacridinae (tribe Cyrtacanthacridini); with a recorded distribution including: India, China, Indochina and Malaysia, Taiwan.
