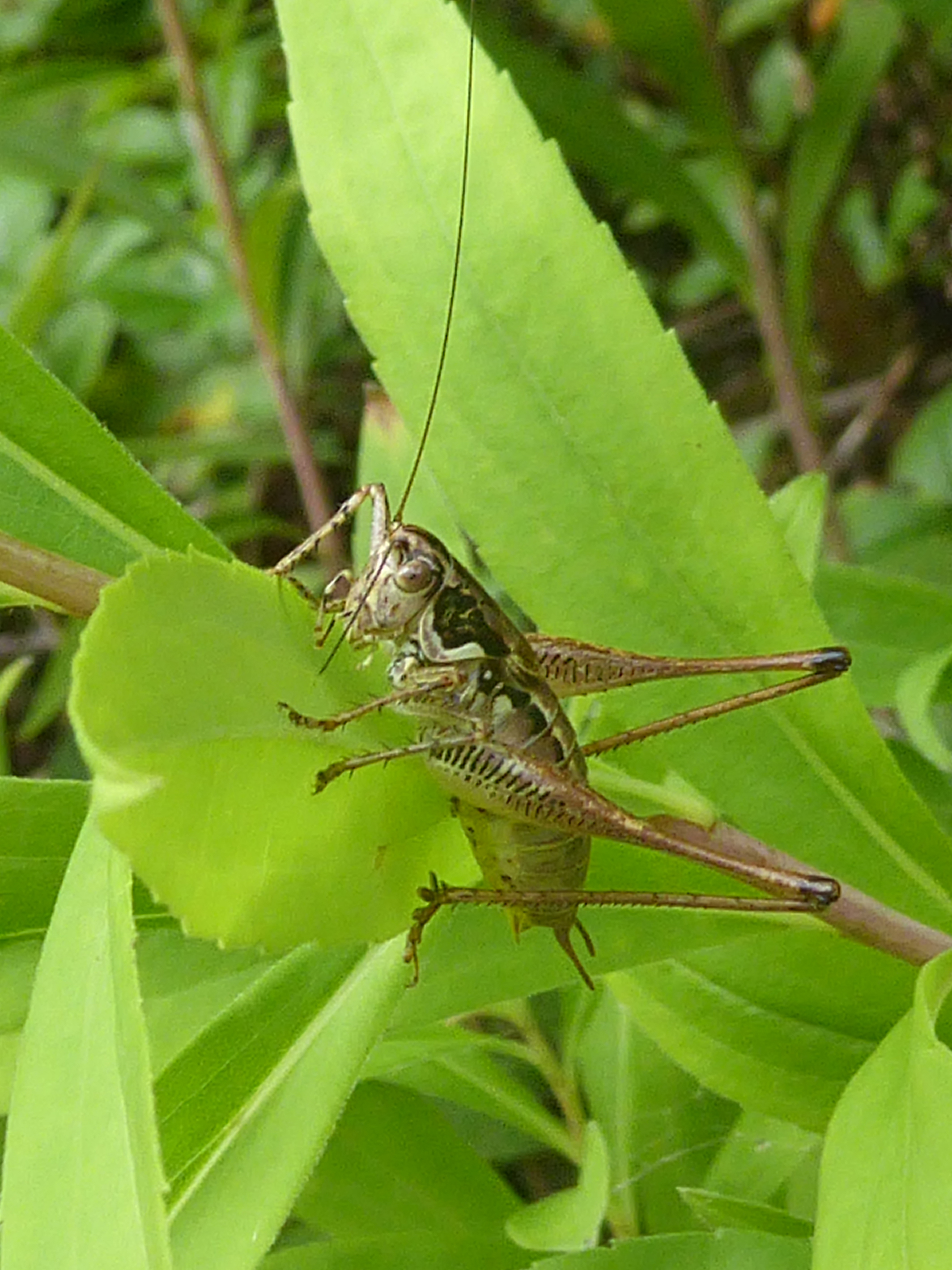
- Pachytrachis striolatus male

Scientific classification
- Domain: Eukaryota
- Kingdom: Animalia
- Phylum: Arthropoda
- Class: Insecta
- Order: Orthoptera
- Suborder: Ensifera
- Family: Tettigoniidae
- Subfamily: Tettigoniinae
- Tribe: Platycleidini
- Genus: Pachytrachis; Uvarov, 1940

Synonyms
- Pachytrachelus Fieber, 1853

= Pachytrachis =

Genus of cricket-like animals

Pachytrachis is a genus of Palaearctic bush crickets in the tribe Platycleidini, erected by Boris Uvarov in 1940. Species have been recorded from Italy, through South-eastern Europe to Turkey.

== Species ==
The Orthoptera Species File lists the following accepted species:

1. Pachytrachis bosniacus Messina, 1979
2. Pachytrachis frater (Brunner von Wattenwyl, 1882)
3. Pachytrachis gracilis (Brunner von Wattenwyl, 1861)
4. Pachytrachis striolatus (Fieber, 1853) - type species (replaced name inherited from synonym Thamnotrizon appendiculatus Brunner von Wattenwyl, 1861)
5. Pachytrachis tumidus Ingrisch & Pavićević, 2010

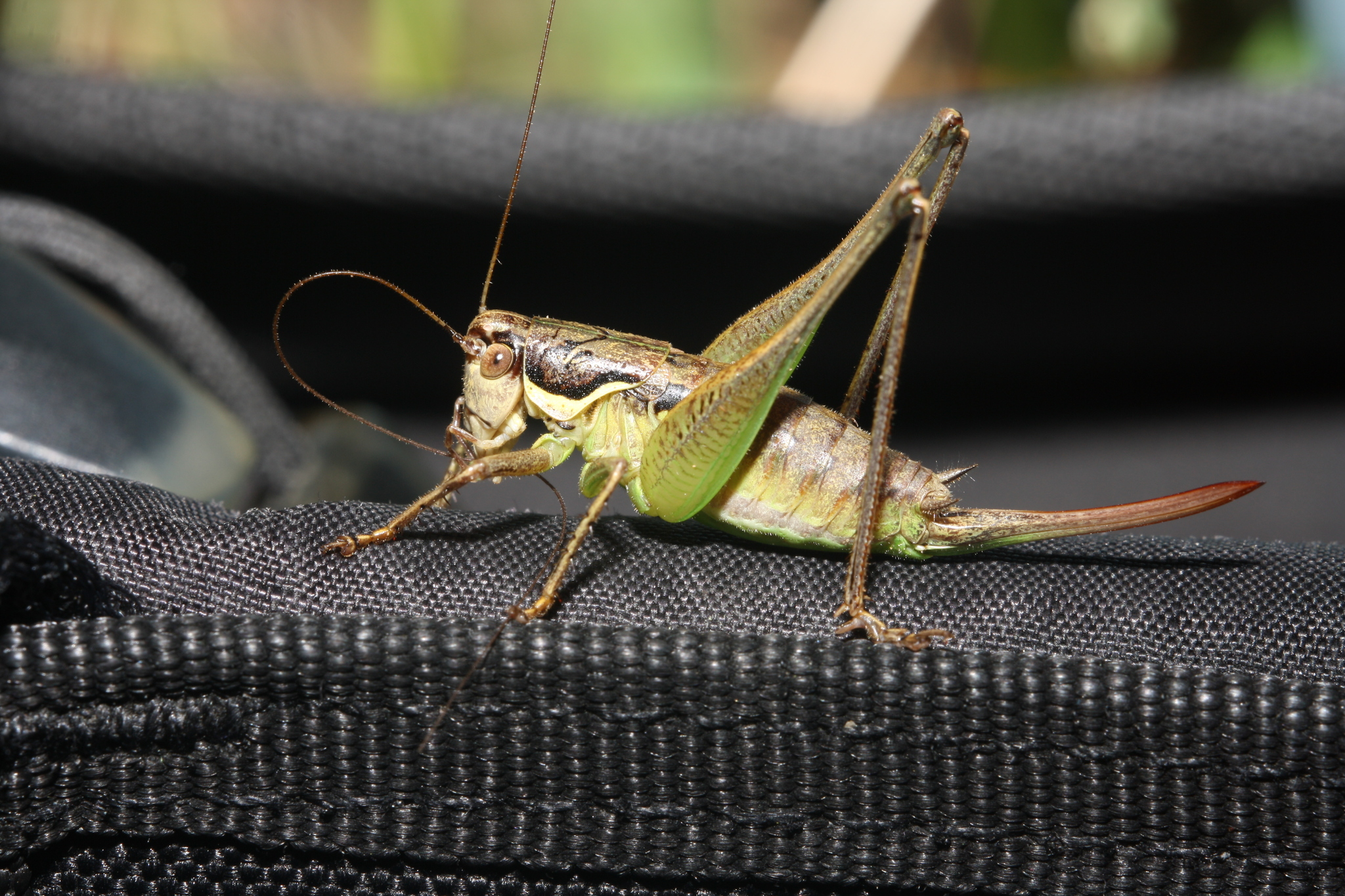
Pachytrachis gracilis female
