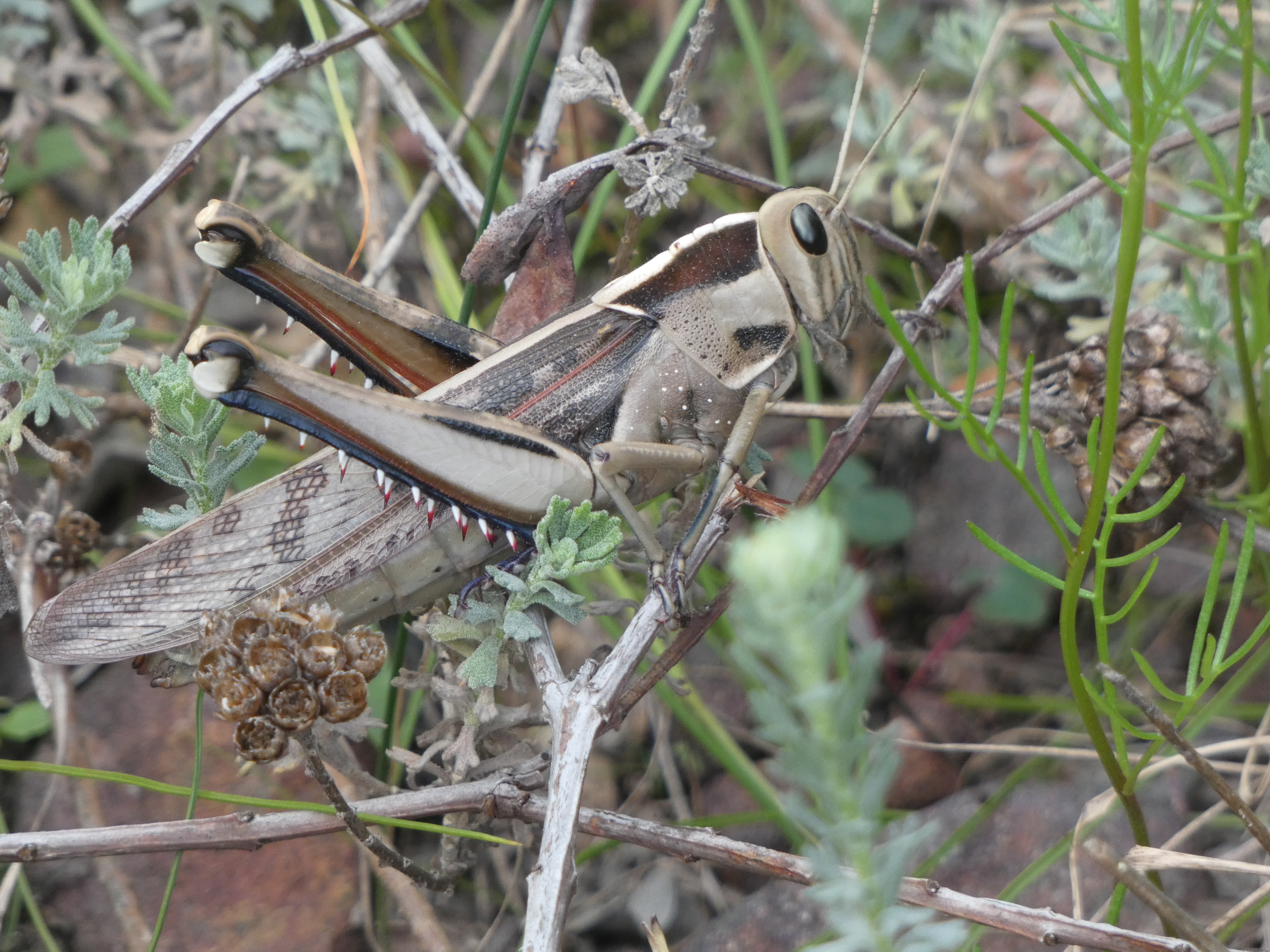
- A. ruficornis (garden locust) in Ghana

Scientific classification
- Domain: Eukaryota
- Kingdom: Animalia
- Phylum: Arthropoda
- Class: Insecta
- Order: Orthoptera
- Suborder: Caelifera
- Superfamily: Acridoidea
- Family: Acrididae
- Subfamily: Cyrtacanthacridinae
- Genus: Acanthacris; Uvarov, 1924

= Acanthacris =

Genus of grasshoppers

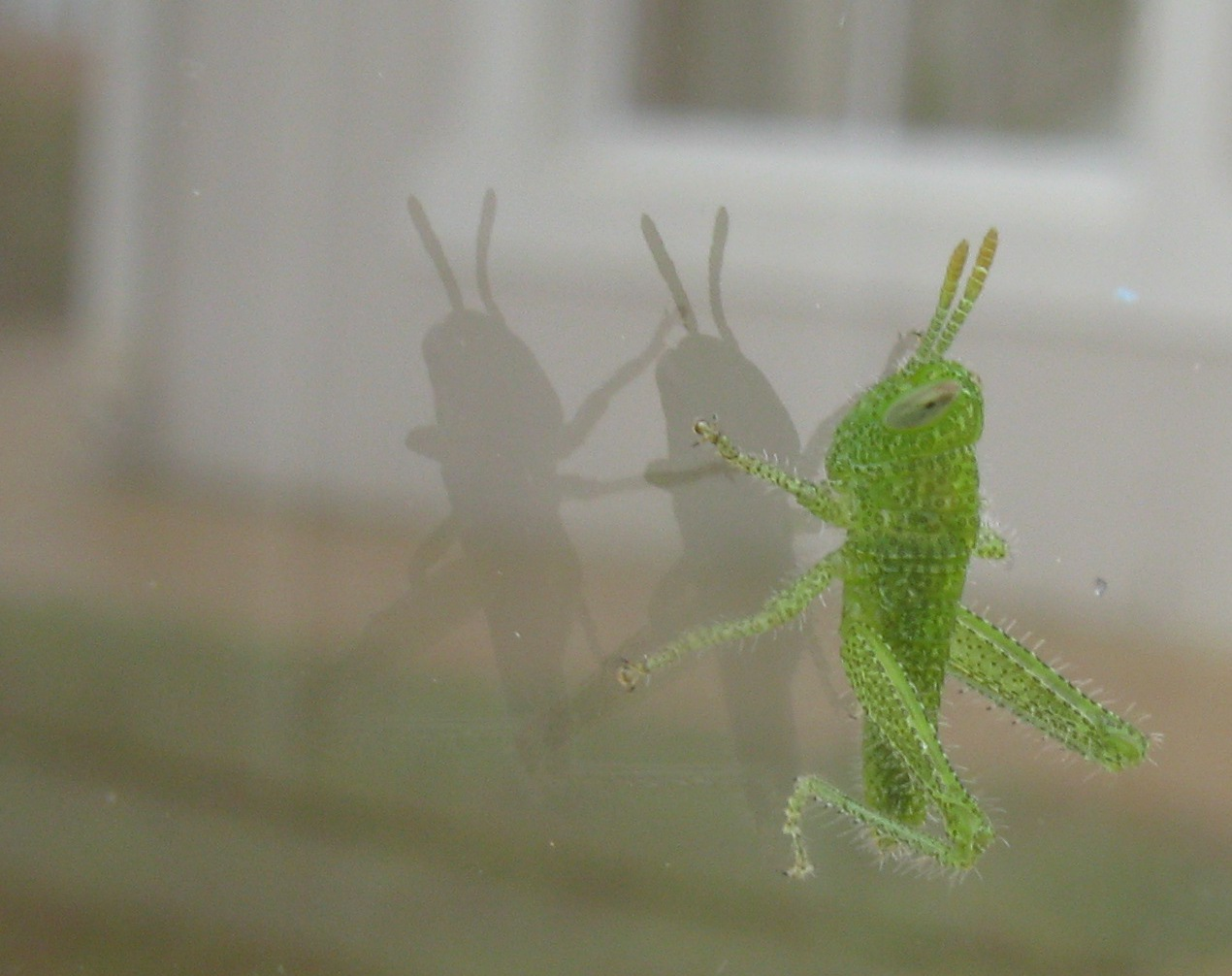
A. ruficornis nymph. Lateral aspect, sitting on glass window. The brown colour only develops at the final ecdysis.

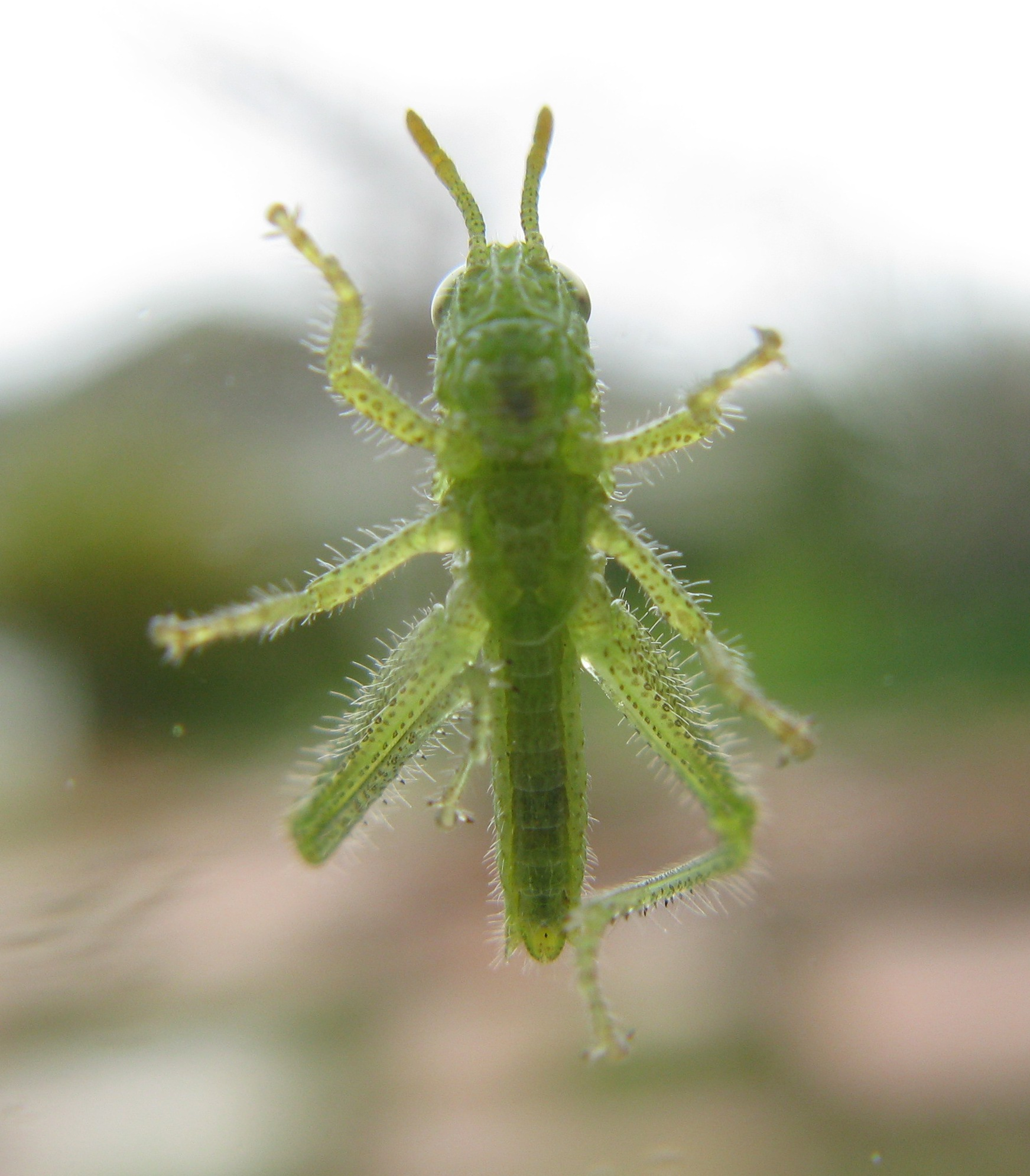
A. ruficornis nymph. Ventral aspect, sitting on glass window.

Acanthacris is a genus of African grasshoppers in the subfamily Cyrtacanthacridinae.

== Species ==
The following species are included:

- Acanthacris aithioptera Mungai, 1987
- Acanthacris deckeni (Gerstaecker, 1869)
- Acanthacris elgonensis Sjöstedt, 1932
- Acanthacris ruficornis (Fabricius, 1787) - type species (as Gryllus ruficornis Fabricius = subsp. A. r. ruficornis)

The genus Acanthacris belongs to subfamily Cyrtacanthacridinae (W.F. Kirby, 1902), of locusts (Acrididae) and other grasshoppers: order Orthoptera.

A. ruficornis is distributed throughout Africa and parts of the Arabian Peninsula, as well as in southern Spain. Other species are recorded from mainland Africa.
