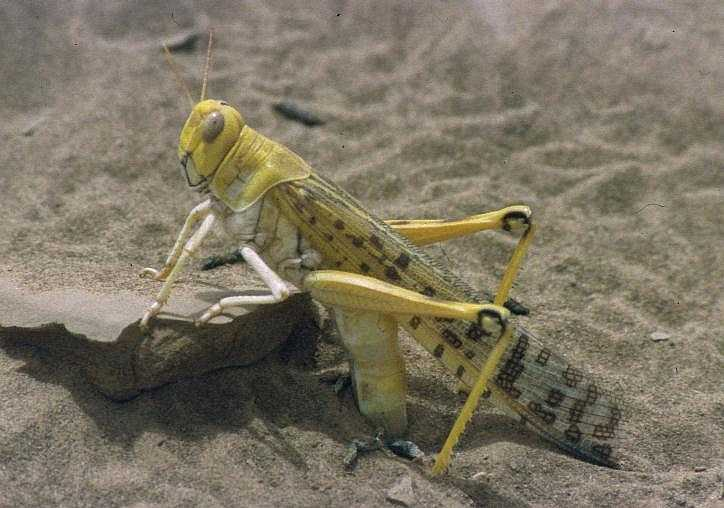
- Desert locust

Scientific classification
- Kingdom: Animalia
- Phylum: Arthropoda
- Clade: Pancrustacea
- Class: Insecta
- Order: Orthoptera
- Suborder: Caelifera
- Nanorder: Acridomorpha
- Superfamily: Acridoidea
- Family: Acrididae
- Subfamily: Cyrtacanthacridinae; Kirby, 1902

= Cyrtacanthacridinae =

Subfamily of grasshoppers

The Cyrtacanthacridinae are a subfamily of Orthoptera: Caelifera in the family Acrididae. They are sometimes referred-to as bird locusts, criquets voyageurs in French-speaking Africa, and Knarrschrecken in German.

It includes species of locusts, short-horned grasshoppers that undergo phase polymorphism and are among the most important pests of sub-Saharan Africa; they include the desert locust and the red locust, with the related Bombay locust in Asia.

One of the characteristics of members of this subfamily is the prominent peg between the forelegs: hence the name for the Australian Spur-throated locust.

== Genera ==
The following genera have been included with a single tribe separated:

=== Cyrtacanthacridini ===
Auth. Kirby, 1910; worldwide distribution (mostly tropical and sub-tropical)

1. Anacridium Uvarov, 1923
2. Chondracris Uvarov, 1923
3. Cyrtacanthacris Walker, 1870
4. Nomadacris Uvarov, 1923 - monotypic N. septemfaciata
5. Ornithacris Uvarov, 1924
6. Patanga Uvarov, 1923
7. †Proschistocerca (P. oligocaenica Zeuner, 1937)
8. Rhadinacris Uvarov, 1923 - monotypic Rhadinacris schistocercoides (Brancsik, 1892) from Madagascar
9. Schistocerca Stål, 1873
10. Valanga Uvarov, 1923
11. Willemsea Uvarov, 1923 - monotypic Willemsea bimaculata (Willemse, 1922) from New Guinea

=== tribe unassigned ===
- Acanthacris Uvarov, 1923
- Acridoderes Bolívar, 1889
- Adramita Uvarov, 1936
- Armatacris Yin, 1979
- Austracris Uvarov, 1923
- Bryophyma Uvarov, 1923
- Caledonula Uvarov, 1939
- Callichloracris Ramme, 1931
- Congoa Bolívar, 1911
- Cristacridium Willemse, 1932
- Finotina Uvarov, 1923
- Gowdeya Uvarov, 1923
- Halmenus Scudder, 1893
- Hebridea Willemse, 1926
- Kinkalidia Sjöstedt, 1931
- Kraussaria Uvarov, 1923
- Mabacris Donskoff, 1986
- Nichelius Bolívar, 1888
- Ootua Uvarov, 1927
- Ordinacris Dirsh, 1966
- Orthacanthacris Karsch, 1896
- Pachyacris Uvarov, 1923
- Pachynotacris Uvarov, 1923
- Parakinkalidia Donskoff, 1986
- Parapachyacris Yin & Yin, 2008
- Rhytidacris Uvarov, 1923
- Ritchiella Mungai, 1992
- Taiacris Donskoff, 1986

== Gallery ==
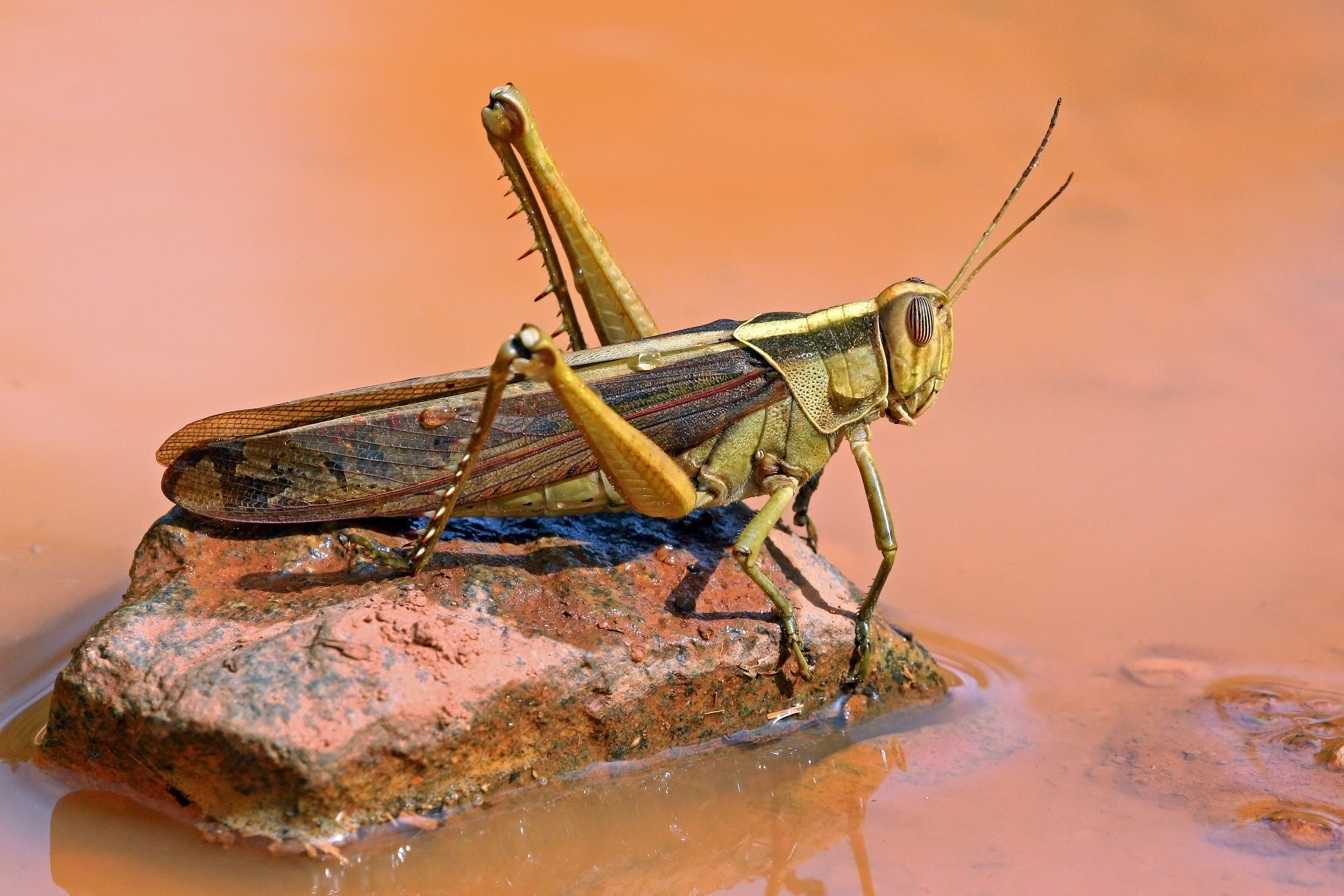
Acanthacris ruficornis, in Ghana

Acridoderes strenuus female

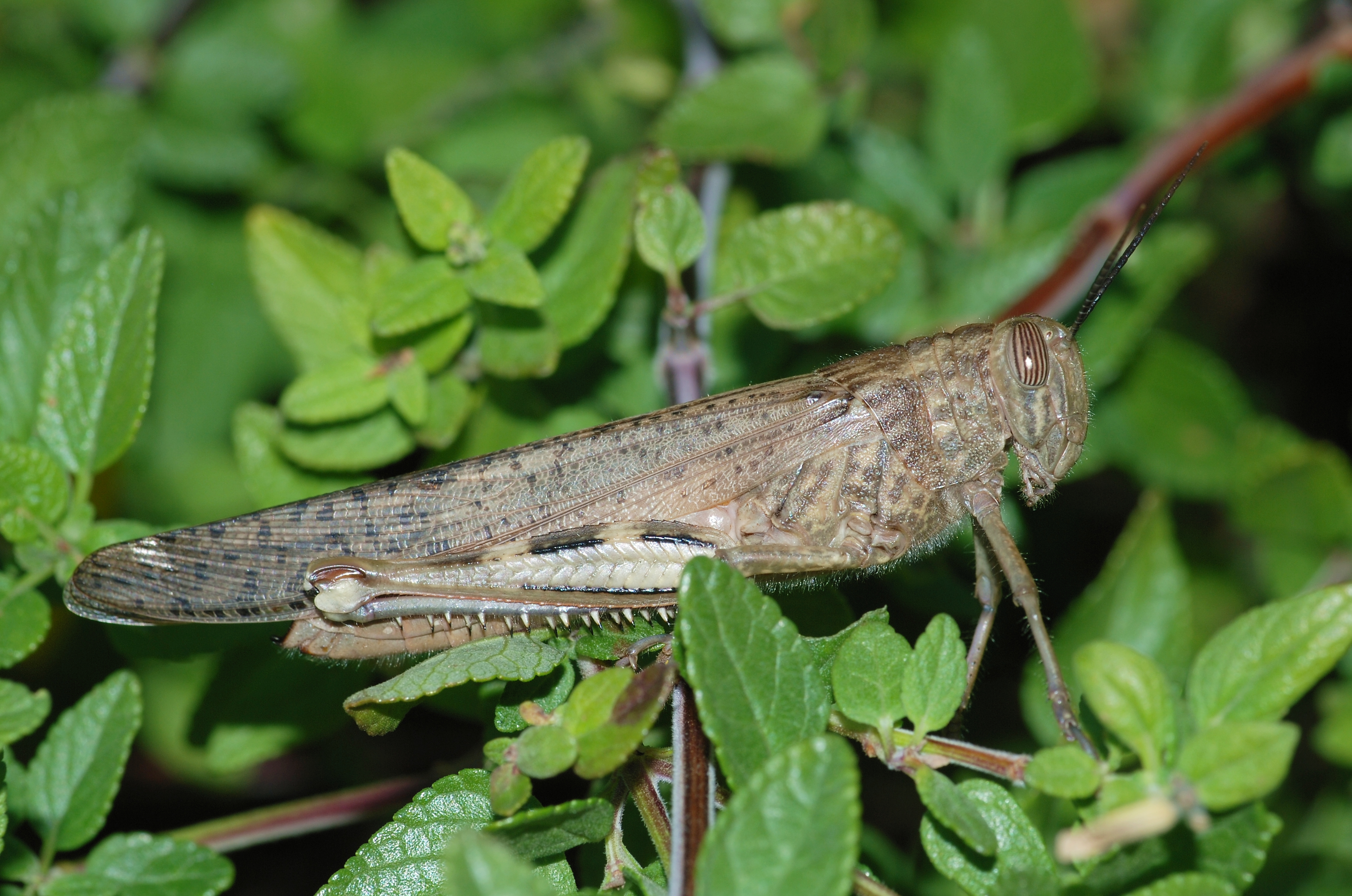
Anacridium aegyptium

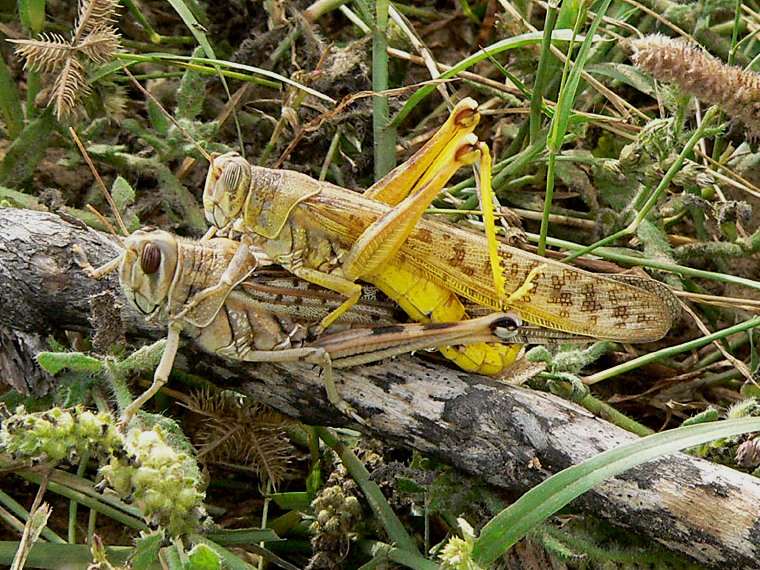
Schistocerca gregaria

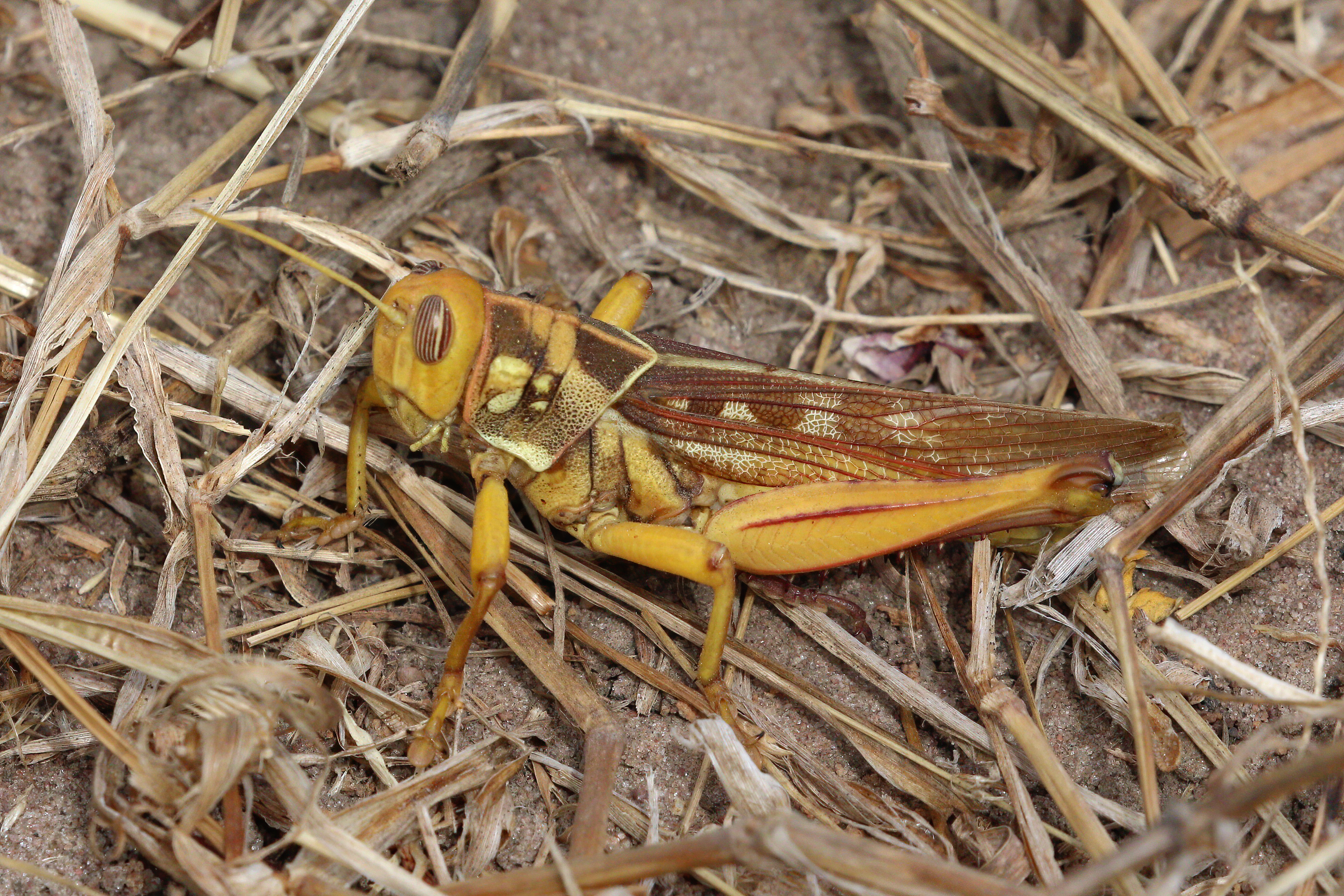
Kraussaria angulifera
