= Nadia Waloff =

English entomologist of Russian descent

- Born: 2 September 1909; St. Petersburg, Russian Empire
- Died: 5 June 2001 (aged 91)
- Education: Imperial College London
- Occupation: Entomologist

Nadejda "Nadia" Waloff FRES (2 September 1909 – 5 June 2001) was a Russian-born English entomologist. She worked on the biology of locusts, flight and dispersal of the Hemiptera, and taught at Imperial College, Silwood Park campus.

Nadia was born in St. Petersburg on 2 September 1909. Her family fled in 1919 and took refuge in Britain. After her mother died in 1926 and her father moved to Romania, Sir Boris Uvarov, who was the director of the Anti-Locust Research Centre in London, took in Nadia, her sister Zena (died 1991,) and two brothers. An early interest in entomology led her and Zena to study at the Imperial College. After earning her bachelor’s degree, Nadia taught at a school for a number of years.

In 1946, Nadia began her work on pests at the Slough laboratory and received a Ph.D and Sc.D from Imperial College. She was known for her exceptional teaching ability and she also conducted research on the diapause of flour moths, the ecology and population dynamics of various insects. Some of her significant research included studies on the dispersal and flight of Hemiptera including leafhoppers.

She examined the factors contributing to wing polymorphism, the presence of wingless, short-winged and long-winged forms in relation to habitats and life-history. She suggested that trees and woody plants are architecturally more complex with leaves being widely separated and making flight more important. This she suggested would explain the observation that cicadas and other arboreal hemiptera rarely had wingless forms. She was also among the first to use radioactive phosphorus, P-35, tracers to study the dispersal of mirid bugs.

Waloff retired in 1978, but in 1990, she was still publishing as a member of the Department of Pure and Applied Biology, at the Silwood Park campus of Imperial College.

The grasshopper Oedaleus nadiae was named after her.

== Selected publications ==
Waloff published under both her given name, Nadejda, and her preferred name, Nadia.

- Waloff, Nadejda. "The mechanisms of humidity reactions of terrestrial isopods." Journal of Experimental Biology 18.2 (1941): 115-135.
- Richards, O. W., and Nadia Waloff. "The study of a population of Ephestia elutella Hübner (Lep., Phycitidae) living on bulk grain." Transactions of the Royal Entomological Society of London 97.11 (1946): 253-298.
- Richards, Owain Westmacott, and Nadejda Waloff. "A study of a natural population of Phytodecta olivacea (Forster)(Coleoptera, Chrysomeloidea)." Philosophical Transactions of the Royal Society of London. Series B, Biological Sciences 244.710 (1961): 205-257.
- Waloff, Nadia. "Studies on the insect fauna on Scotch broom Sarothamnus scoparius (L.) Wimmer." Advances in ecological research. Vol. 5. Academic Press, 1968. 87-208.
- Mound, Laurence Alfred, and Nadia Waloff. "Diversity of insect faunas;(papers of the ninth Symposium of the Royal Entomological Society held in London, on 22-23 Sep 1977)." (1978).
- Waloff, Nadia, ed. "Diversity of insect faunas." Royal Entomological Society, 1978.
- Waloff, Nadia, and G B Popov. "Sir Boris Uvarov (1889-1970): The Father of Acridology." Annual Review of Entomology 1990 35:1, 1-26
