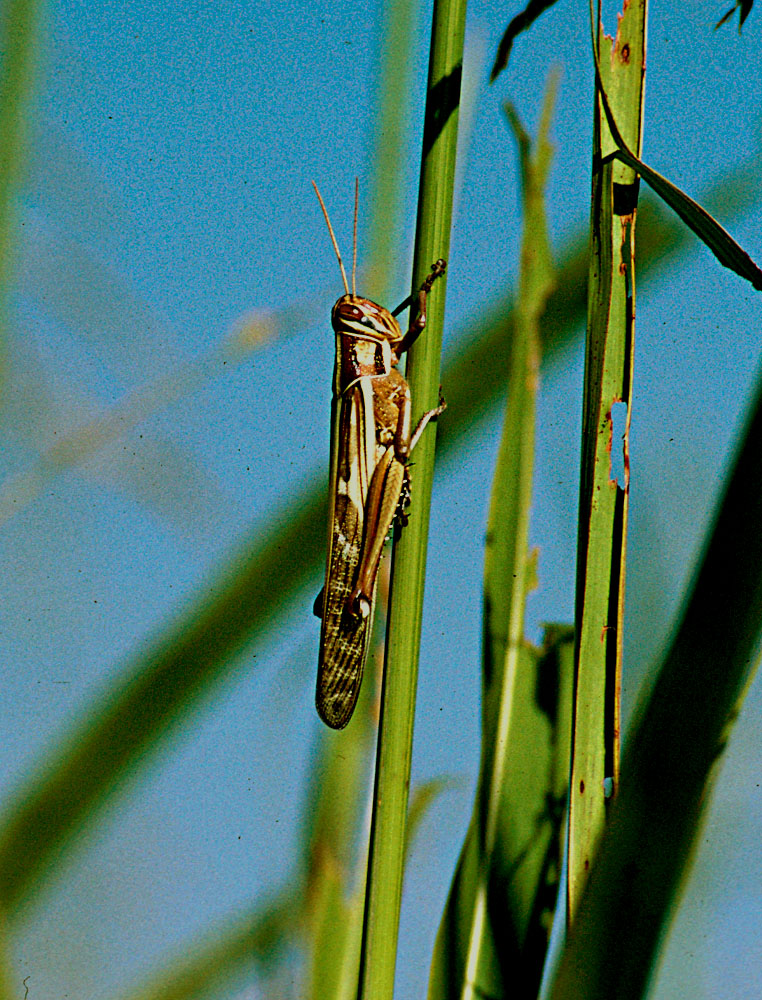

Scientific classification
- Kingdom: Animalia
- Phylum: Arthropoda
- Class: Insecta
- Order: Orthoptera
- Suborder: Caelifera
- Family: Acrididae
- Subfamily: Cyrtacanthacridinae
- Tribe: Cyrtacanthacridini
- Genus: Nomadacris; Uvarov, 1923
- Species: N. septemfasciata

Binomial name
- Nomadacris septemfasciata (Audinet-Serville, 1883)
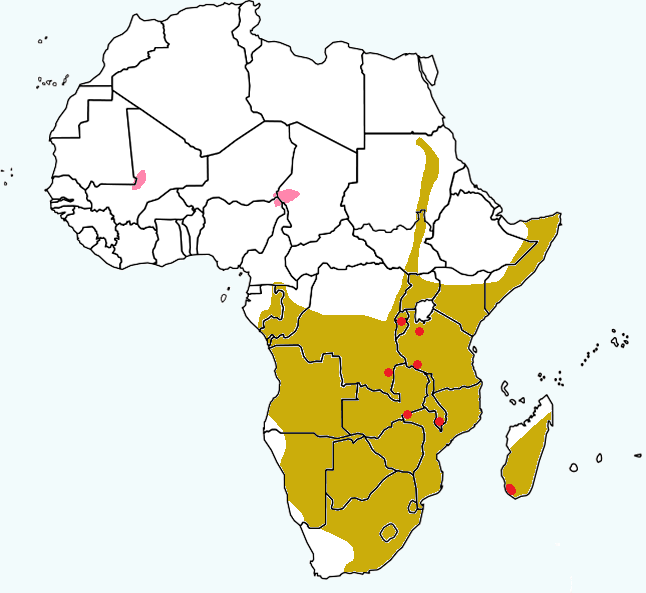
- outbreak areas invasion areas isolated high concentrations

= Red locust =

Species of grasshopper

The red locust (Nomadacris septemfasciata) is a large grasshopper species found in sub-Saharan Africa. Its name refers to the colour of its hind wings. It is sometimes called the criquet nomade in French, due to its nomadic movements in the dry season. When it forms swarms, it is described as a locust.

Nomadacris septemfasciata is in the family Acrididae and is the only member of the genus Nomadacris. The genus Nomadacris was erected in 1923 by Boris Uvarov and the species was named originally as Acridium septemfasciatum by Jean Guillaume Audinet-Serville in 1838. It is placed in the subfamily Cyrtacanthacridinae, the bird locusts. Other species previously placed in Nomadacris are now considered part of the genus Patanga.

== Description ==
=== Adults ===
The overall colour of adult insects is a mixture of light beige and brown. They have seven brown transverse bands on the elytra, justifying the species name septemfasciata. The pronotum has two brown lateral bands.

Males are 60–70 mm (2.4–2.8 in) long; females are 60–85 mm (2.4–3.3 in) long.

=== Nymphs ===
Unlike adults, the colour of immature insects varies depending on their phase. When solitary, they can be green or brown; when in large numbers (gregarious), they are bright yellow and red-brown with black markings.

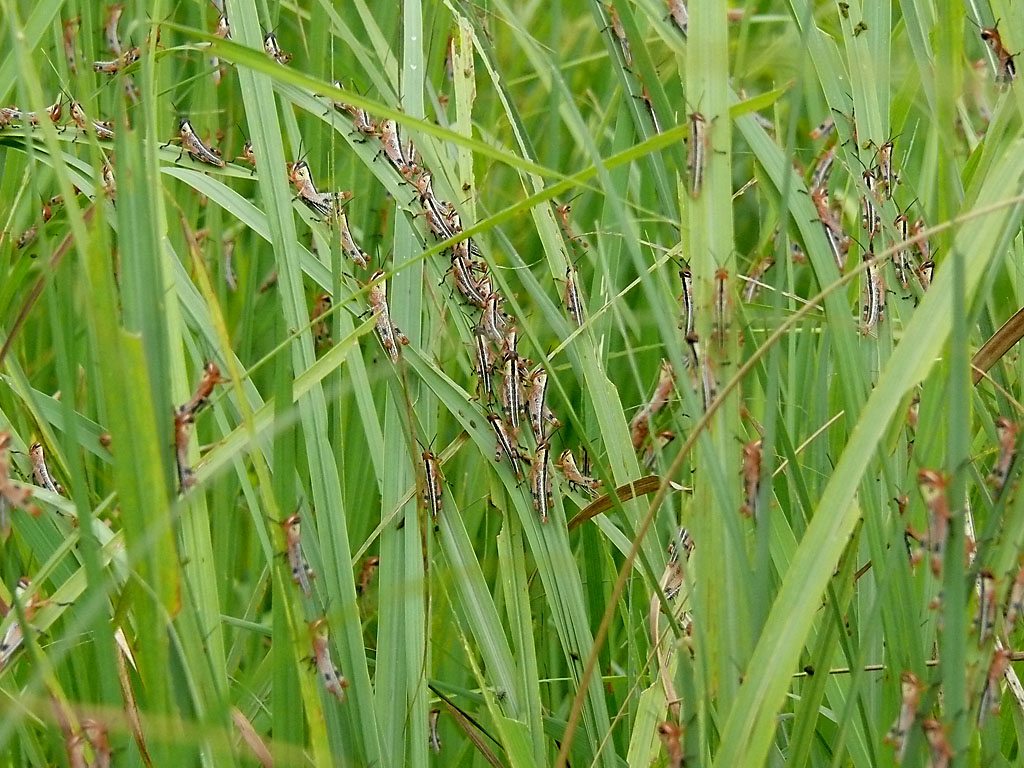
Hopper band in Iku-Katavi, Tanzania

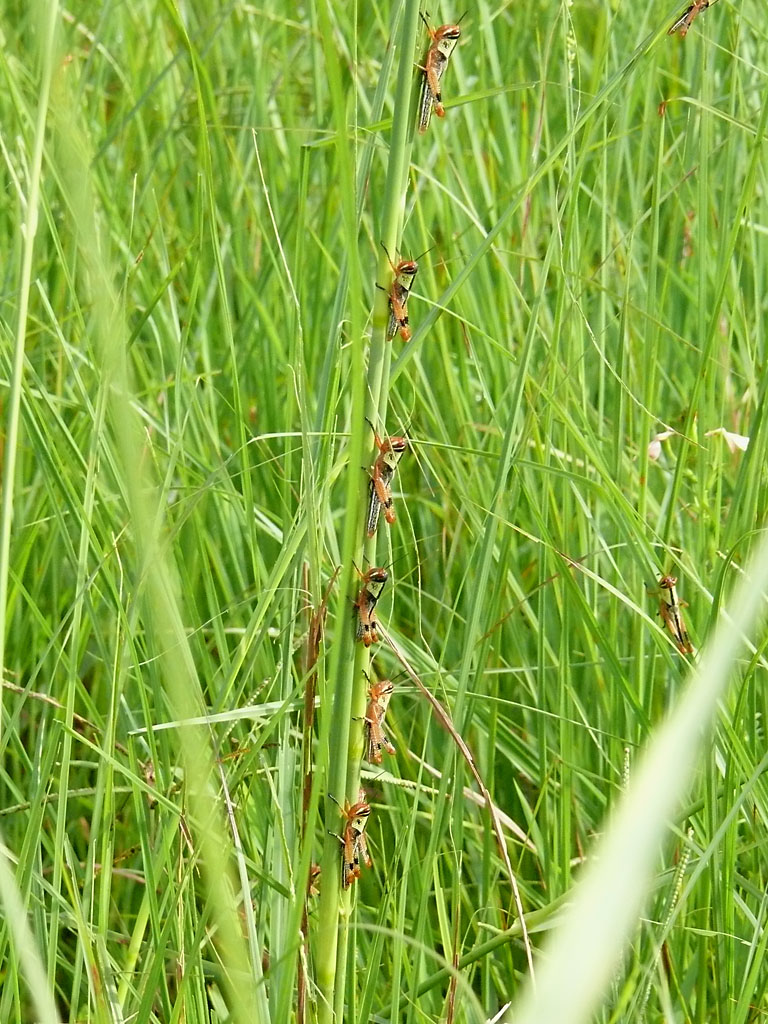
Hoppers on wild sorghum stalk

== Ecology ==
Red locusts actively seek out moist environments such as seasonal floodplains. Grains are their primary food source, so grassy lowlands are prime habitat. They also like spending time in trees and thus prefer some tree cover.

Red locusts are sedentary when ample shelter, perches, and food are available. In dry years, when the amount of suitable habitat is reduced, population densities increase. If the population density increases past a threshold, the locusts transform into their gregarious phase, changing their behaviour and anatomy. When gregarious, red locusts keep together in large swarms and fly with the wind in daylight hours, looking for more food. The higher temperatures during daylight enable gregarious locusts to travel longer distances by flying longer and higher, aided by thermal lift. A swarm rarely moves more than 20–30 km in a day. In contrast, solitary locusts prefer to fly in the dark and do so alone.

Compared to their solitary phase, gregarious red locusts also have:

- reduced lifespan
- more markings
- five instar stages rather than six
- longer sexual maturation
- larger and heavier young, although they lay fewer eggs

Swarming females often lay eggs at night. Their young immediately behave gregariously and are capable of "hopping" hundreds of metres every day.

== Outbreaks ==
Outbreak areas have been identified in Zambia, Tanzania, Malawi, Madagascar, and Réunion. In the Sahel, the species is observed on a more incidental basis in Cape Verde, the central Niger River delta in Mali, and around Lake Chad. Large swarms attacked the KwaZulu-Natal region which contributed to creating conditions which favoured the 1890s African rinderpest outbreak. The last widespread plague occurred from 1930 to 1944, when almost all of southern Africa was invaded.

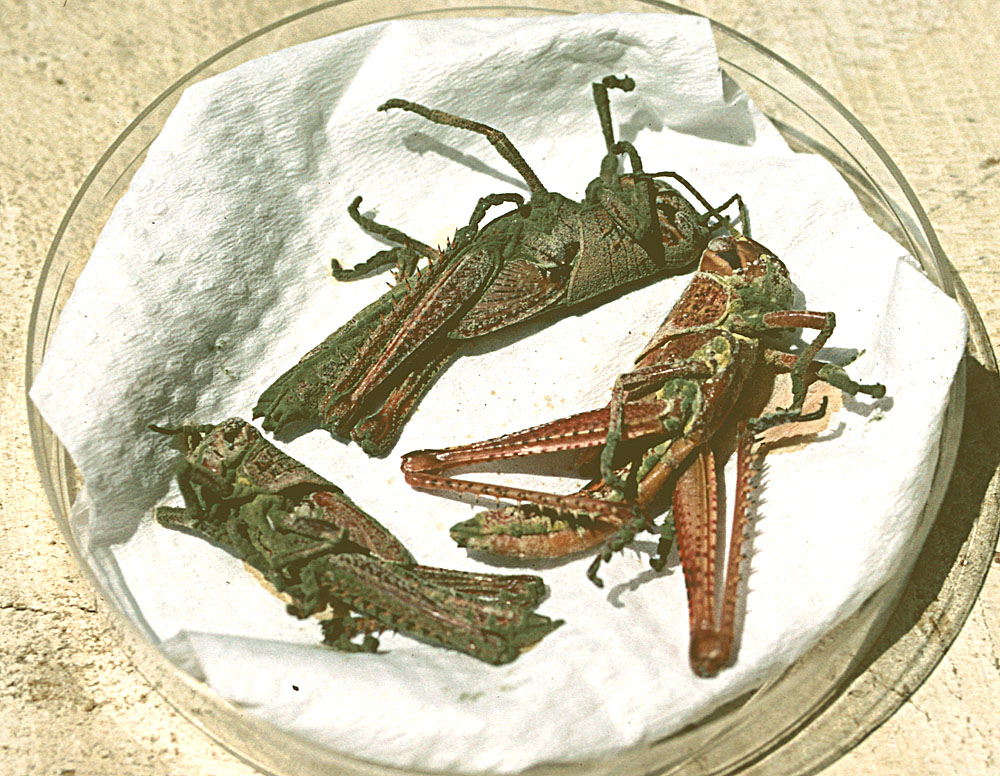
Hoppers killed by the fungus Metarhizium acridum

After unsuccessful efforts to control the locusts through environmental modifications, chemical agents are currently being used. A biological product based on an entomopathogenic fungus, Metarhizium acridum, is now available (see desert locust). It has been successfully tested on both nymphs and adults of the red locust. However, over recent years, a new mechanism to control pests was created. The Integrated pest management (IPM) is a combination of environmentally friendly methods that together can be used effectively as a pest management strategy.
