= Adramita =

Scientific classification
- Kingdom: Animalia
- Phylum: Arthropoda
- Clade: Pancrustacea
- Class: Insecta
- Order: Orthoptera
- Suborder: Caelifera
- Family: Acrididae
- Genus: Adramita; Uvarov, 1936
- Species: A. arabica

Binomial name
- Adramita arabica (Uvarov, 1930)

Genus of grasshoppers

Adramita is a monotypic genus of grasshoppers in the subfamily Cyrtacanthacridinae with a species found in the Arabian Peninsula.

== Species ==
The following species is recognised in the genus Adramita:

- Adramita arabica (Uvarov, 1930)
