= Rhytidacris =

Scientific classification
- Domain: Eukaryota
- Kingdom: Animalia
- Phylum: Arthropoda
- Class: Insecta
- Order: Orthoptera
- Suborder: Caelifera
- Family: Acrididae
- Subfamily: Cyrtacanthacridinae
- Genus: Rhytidacris; Uvarov, 1923

Type species
- Cyrtacanthacris tectiferus Karsch, 1896

Genus of grasshoppers

Rhytidacris is a genus of grasshoppers in the subfamily Cyrtacanthacridinae with species found in Africa.

== Species ==
The following species are recognised in the genus Rhytidacris:

- Rhytidacris punctata (Kirby, 1902)
- Rhytidacris tectifera (Karsch, 1896)
