= Halmenus =

Scientific classification
- Domain: Eukaryota
- Kingdom: Animalia
- Phylum: Arthropoda
- Class: Insecta
- Order: Orthoptera
- Suborder: Caelifera
- Family: Acrididae
- Subfamily: Cyrtacanthacridinae
- Genus: Halmenus; Scudder, 1893

Type species
- Halmenus robustus Scudder, 1893

Genus of grasshoppers

Halmenus is a genus of grasshoppers in the subfamily Cyrtacanthacridinae with species found in Galápagos Islands, Ecuador.

== Species ==
The following species are recognised in the genus Halmenus:

- Halmenus choristopterus Snodgrass, 1902
- Halmenus cuspidatus Snodgrass, 1902
- Halmenus eschatus Hebard, 1920
- Halmenus robustus Scudder, 1893
