= Pachyacris =

Scientific classification
- Domain: Eukaryota
- Kingdom: Animalia
- Phylum: Arthropoda
- Class: Insecta
- Order: Orthoptera
- Suborder: Caelifera
- Family: Acrididae
- Subfamily: Cyrtacanthacridinae
- Genus: Pachyacris; Uvarov, 1923

Genus of grasshoppers

Pachyacris is a genus of grasshoppers in the subfamily Cyrtacanthacridinae with no assigned tribe. Species are recorded from sub-continental India, Indo-China through to Vietnam.

== Species ==
The Orthoptera Species File. lists:

- Pachyacris compressa Rehn, 1941
- Pachyacris vinosa (Walker, 1870)
- Pachyacris violascens (Walker, 1870) - type species (as Acridium violascens Walker F)
