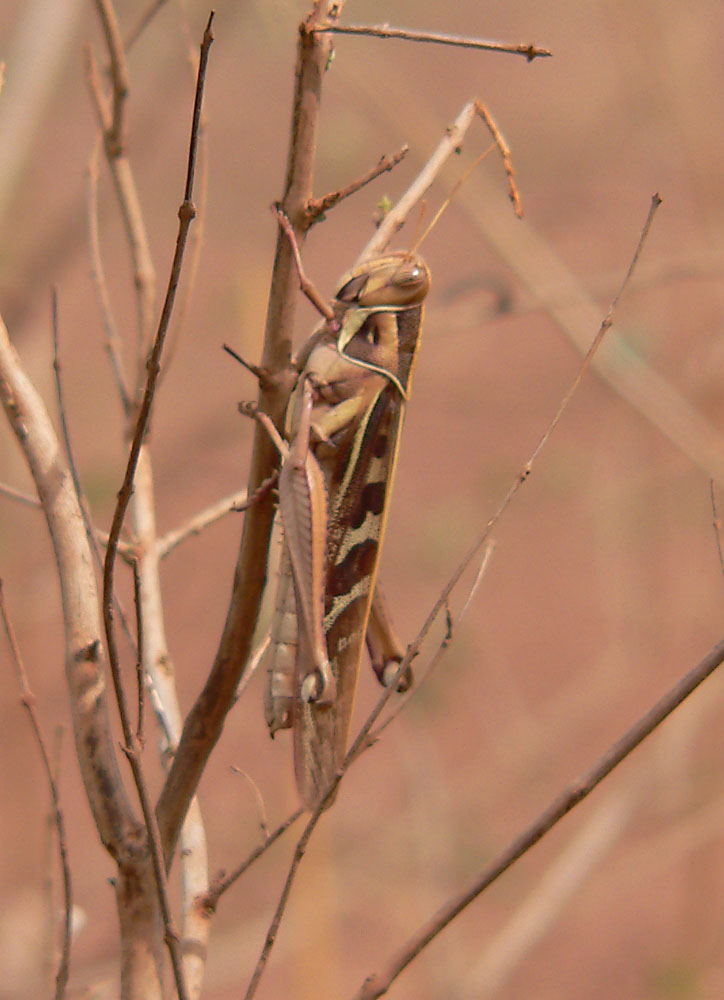
- Ornithacris cavroisi

Scientific classification
- Domain: Eukaryota
- Kingdom: Animalia
- Phylum: Arthropoda
- Class: Insecta
- Order: Orthoptera
- Suborder: Caelifera
- Superfamily: Acridoidea
- Family: Acrididae
- Subfamily: Cyrtacanthacridinae
- Tribe: Cyrtacanthacridini
- Genus: Ornithacris; Uvarov, 1924

Synonyms
- Glaphyra Uvarov, 1923; Graphyra Otte, 1995

= Ornithacris =

Genus of grasshoppers

Ornithacris is a genus of grasshoppers in the subfamily Cyrtacanthacridinae. These are large insects, recognisable by their brightly coloured wings when caught: although they are difficult to catch being strong fliers. Species are found throughout Africa, south of the Sahara and may be moderately significant to minor agricultural pests.

== Species ==
The Orthoptera Species File lists:

- Ornithacris cavroisi Finot, 1907
- Ornithacris cyanea Stoll, 1813 - type species (as Gryllus cyaneus Stoll, C. = O. cyanea cyanea); synonym Ornithacris imperialis Rehn, 1943
- Ornithacris pictula Walker, 1870
- Ornithacris turbida Walker, 1870
