= Kinkalidia =

Scientific classification
- Domain: Eukaryota
- Kingdom: Animalia
- Phylum: Arthropoda
- Class: Insecta
- Order: Orthoptera
- Suborder: Caelifera
- Family: Acrididae
- Subfamily: Cyrtacanthacridinae
- Genus: Kinkalidia; Sjöstedt, 1931

Type species
- Kinkalidia robusta Sjöstedt, 1931

Genus of grasshoppers

Kinkalidia is a genus of grasshoppers in the subfamily Cyrtacanthacridinae with species found in Africa.

== Species ==
The following species are recognised in the genus Kinkalidia:

- Kinkalidia matilei Donskoff, 2000
- Kinkalidia robusta Sjöstedt, 1931
