= Parapachyacris =

Scientific classification
- Kingdom: Animalia
- Phylum: Arthropoda
- Clade: Pancrustacea
- Class: Insecta
- Order: Orthoptera
- Suborder: Caelifera
- Family: Acrididae
- Subfamily: Cyrtacanthacridinae
- Genus: Parapachyacris; Yin & Yin, 2008
- Species: P. taiwanensis

Binomial name
- Parapachyacris taiwanensis Yin & Yin, 2008

Species of grasshopper

Parapachyacris is a genus of grasshoppers in the family Acrididae. It is monotypic, being represented by the single species, Parapachyacris taiwanensis, which is found in Taiwan

== Description ==
As of 2008, only the female of the species has been described. The length is 58 millimetres (2.3 in) with a darkish-brown body color and a yellow longitudinal stripe on the head and first body segment. The rear leg is yellowish-brown with yellow banding.
