= Pachytrachis tumidus =

Conservation status
- Near Threatened (IUCN 3.1)

Scientific classification
- Kingdom: Animalia
- Phylum: Arthropoda
- Class: Insecta
- Order: Orthoptera
- Suborder: Ensifera
- Family: Tettigoniidae
- Genus: Pachytrachis
- Species: P. tumidus

Binomial name
- Pachytrachis tumidus (Ingrisch & Pavićević, 2010)
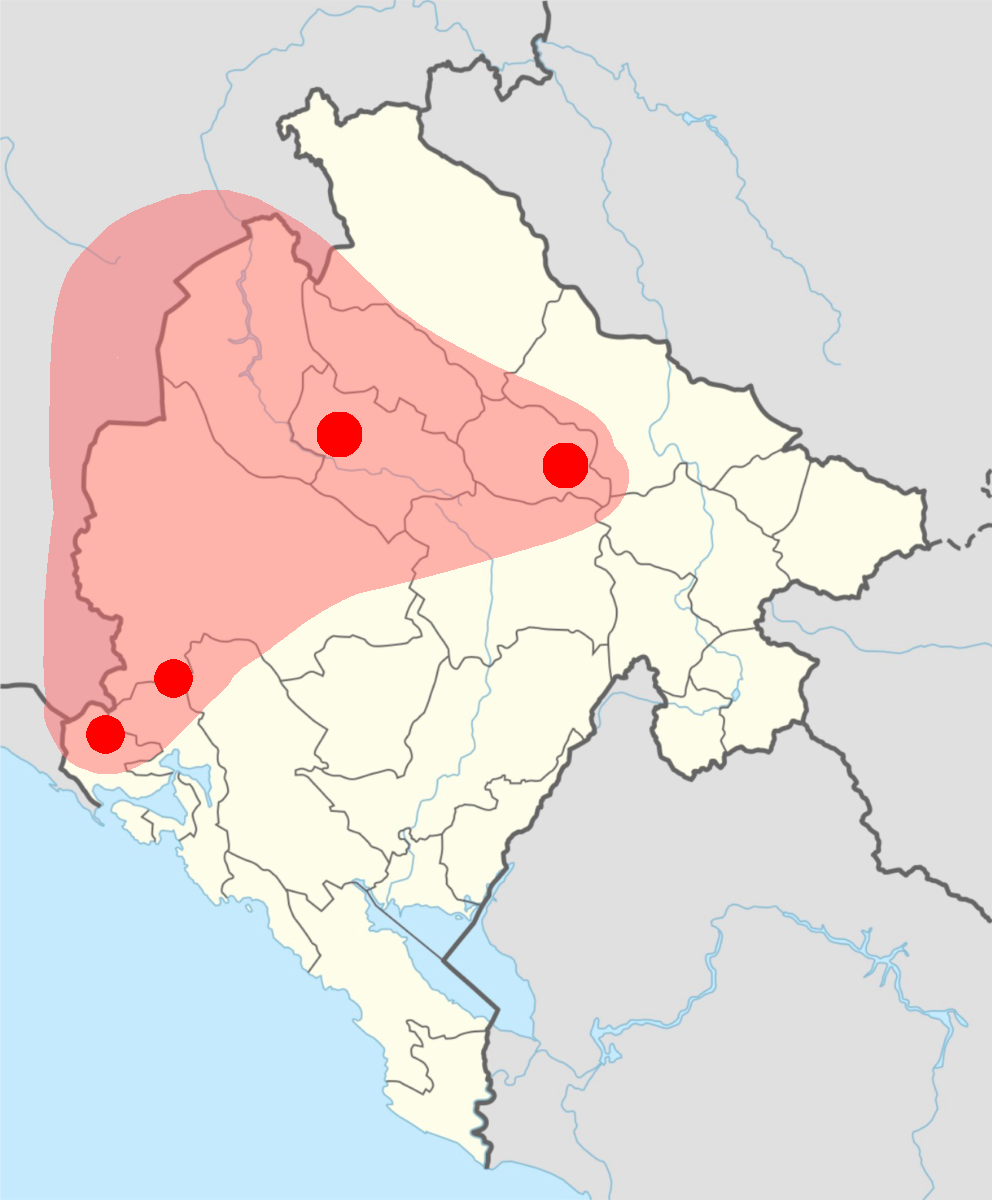

Species of insect

Pachytrachis tumidus, the Durmitor bush-cricket, is a species of a katydid found in Montenegro and Bosnia and Hercegovina.

== Distribution ==
This species' range is primarily in Montenegro, with a known extension into Bosnia and Herzegovina. It inhabits high-altitude rocky slopes, often with juniper bushes, typically above 1,400 meters. It is a nocturnal predator and scavenger, feeding on small insects and plant matter.
