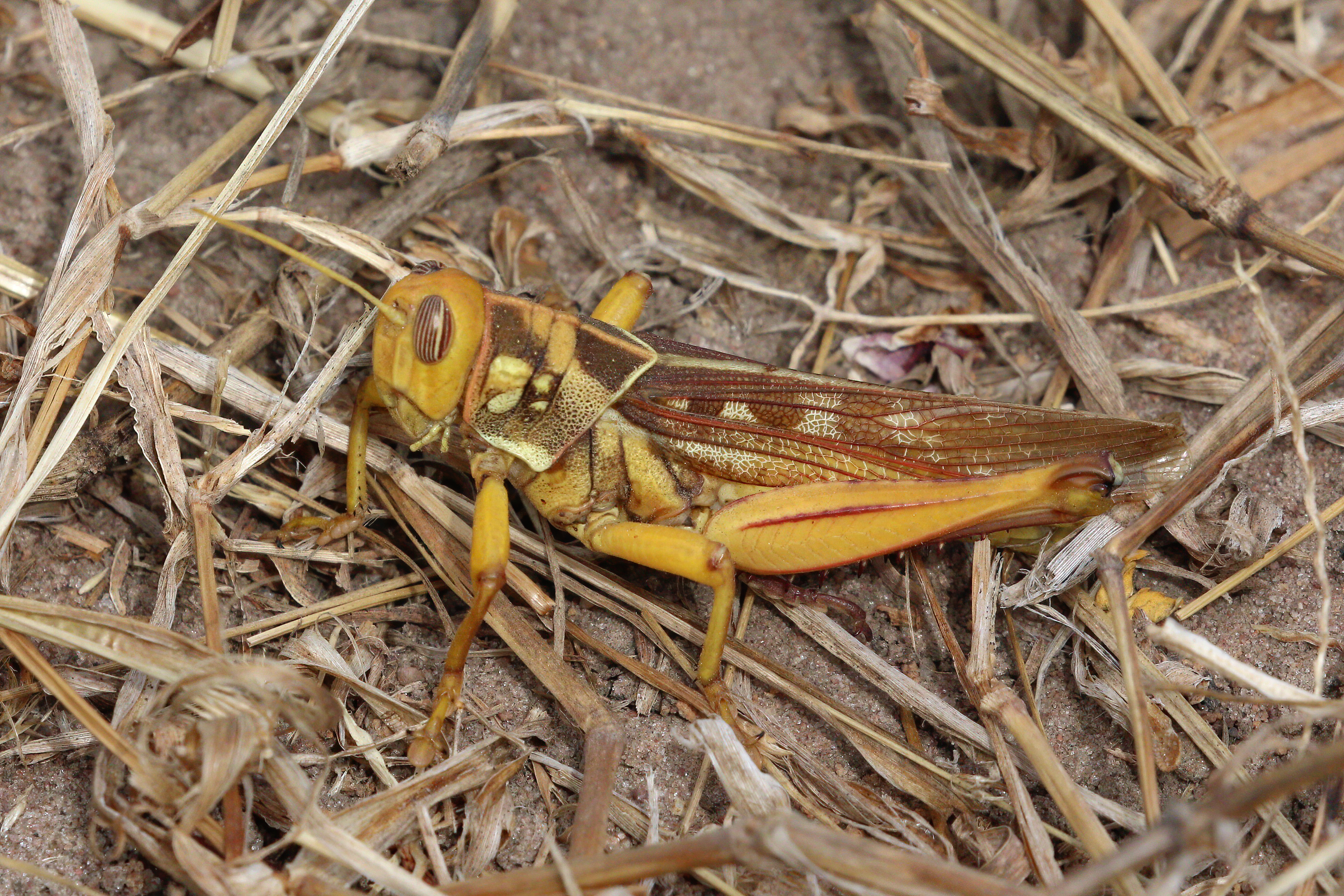

Scientific classification
- Kingdom: Animalia
- Phylum: Arthropoda
- Class: Insecta
- Order: Orthoptera
- Suborder: Caelifera
- Family: Acrididae
- Genus: Kraussaria
- Species: K. angulifera

Binomial name
- Kraussaria angulifera (Krauss, 1877)

= Kraussaria angulifera =

Species of grasshopper

Kraussaria angulifera is a species of grasshopper in the family Acrididae found in Africa. The grasshopper is commonly found in the Sahelian region of West Africa, where it is known as a common pest of the pearl millet.

== Human consumption ==
Kraussaria angulifera is the edible grasshopper species that is most relished by the north and central Dogon people of Mali.

== Gallery ==
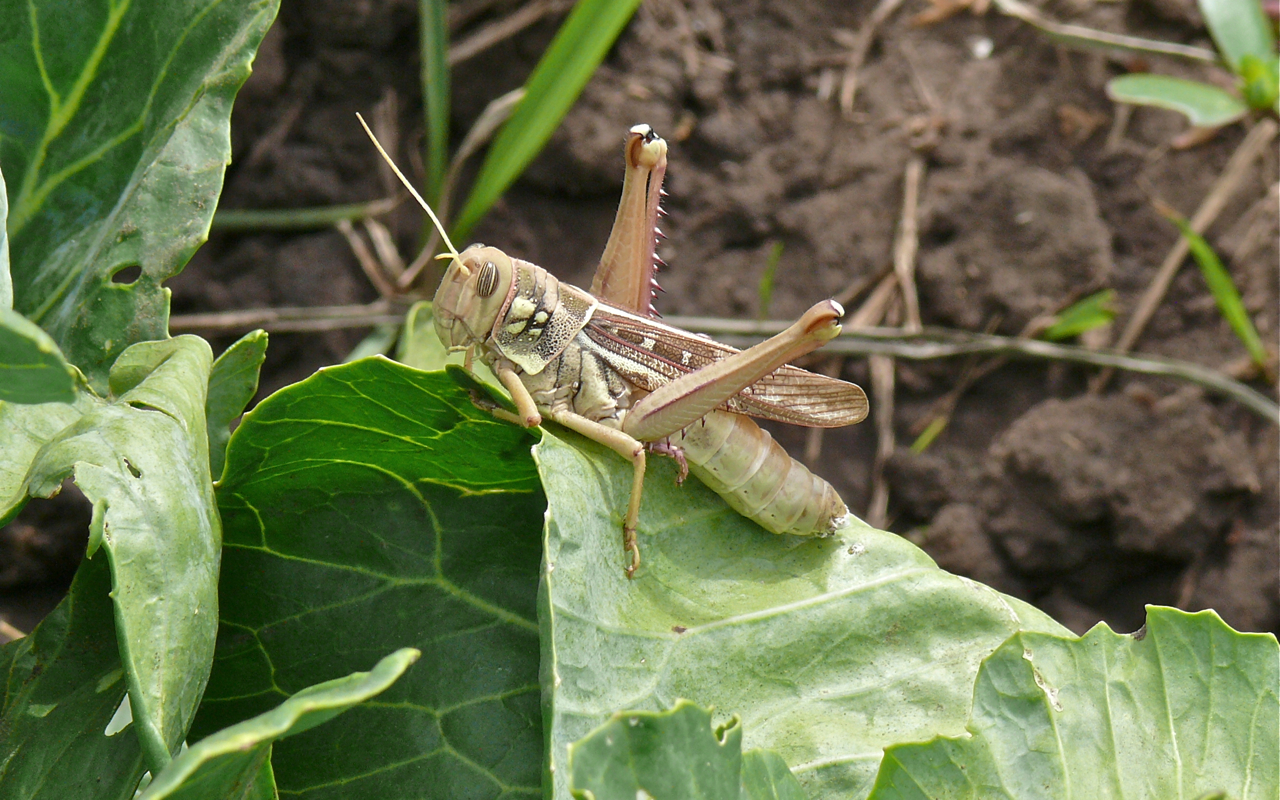
Female

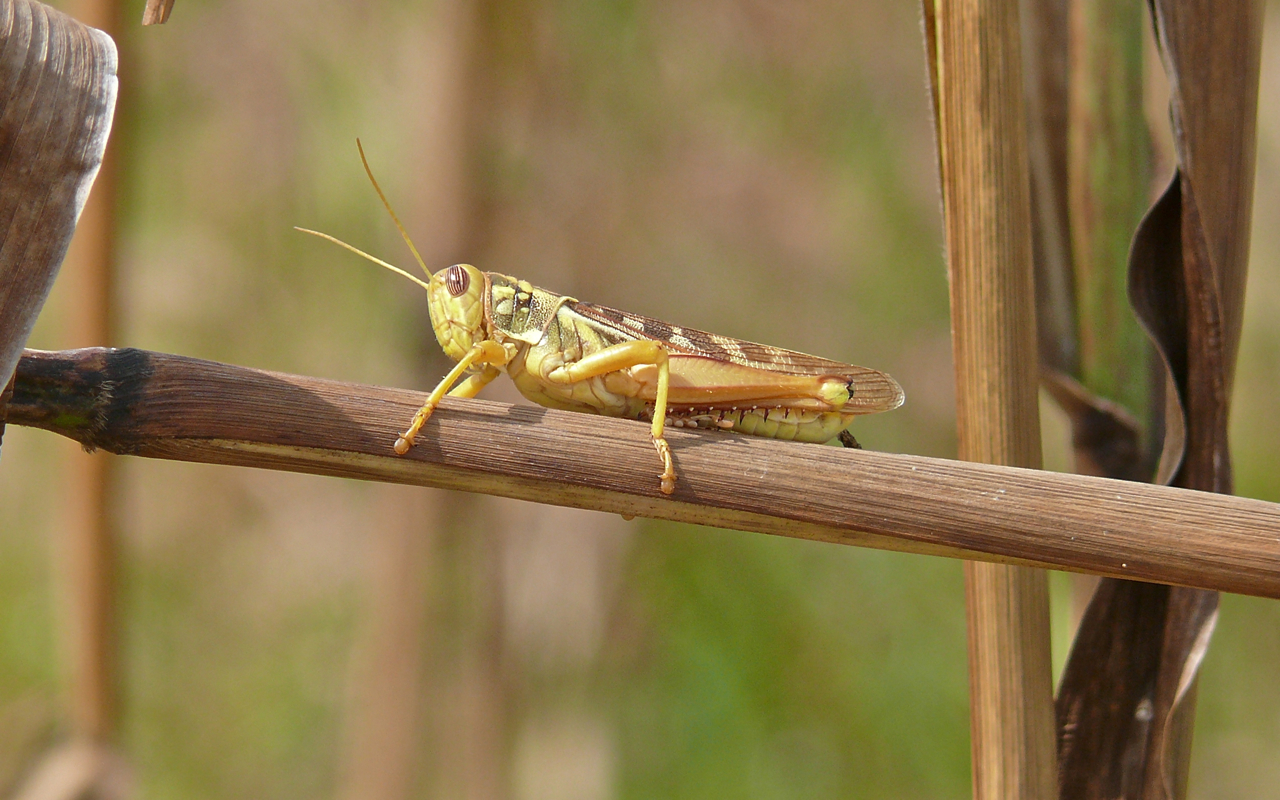
Male

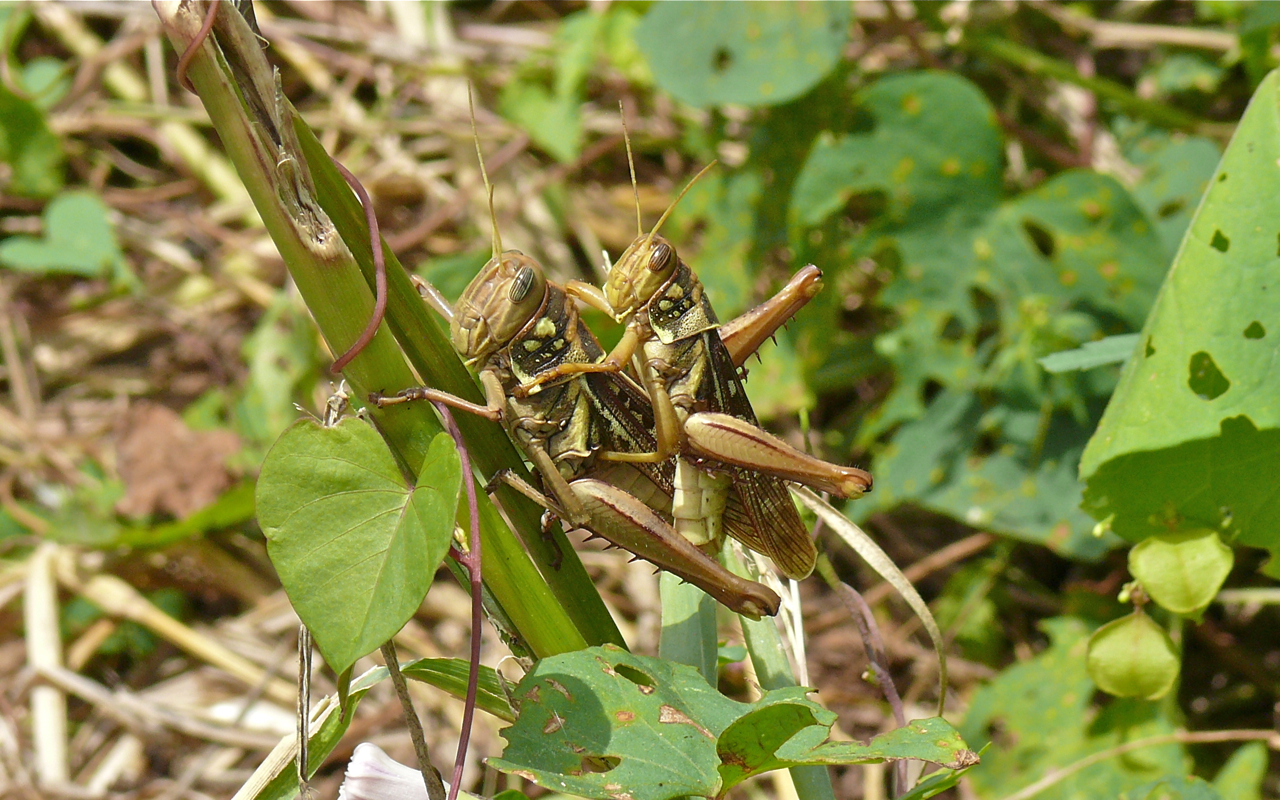
Mating

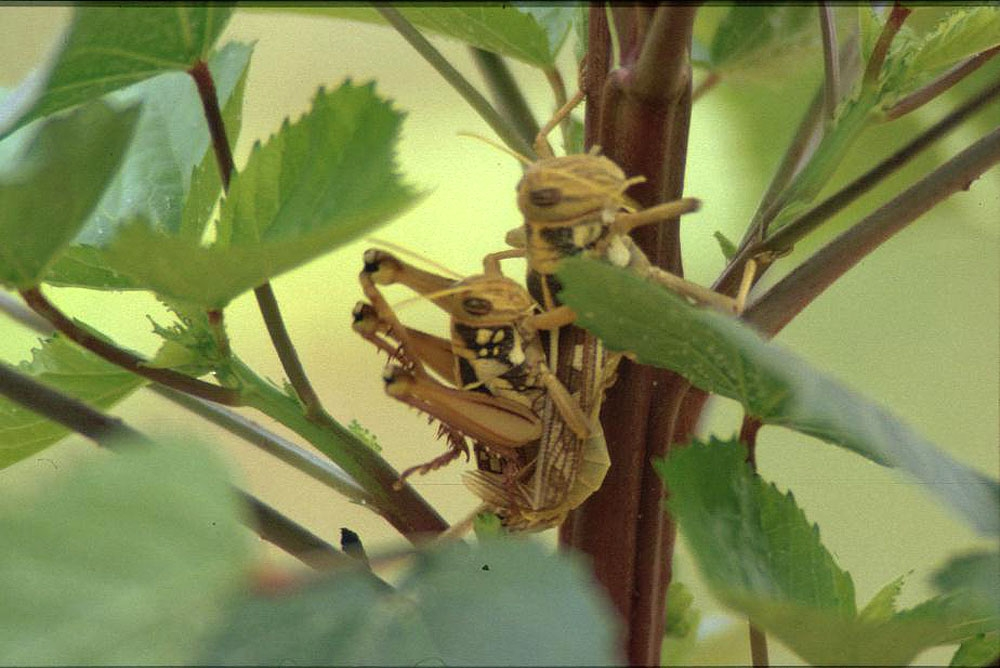
Mating

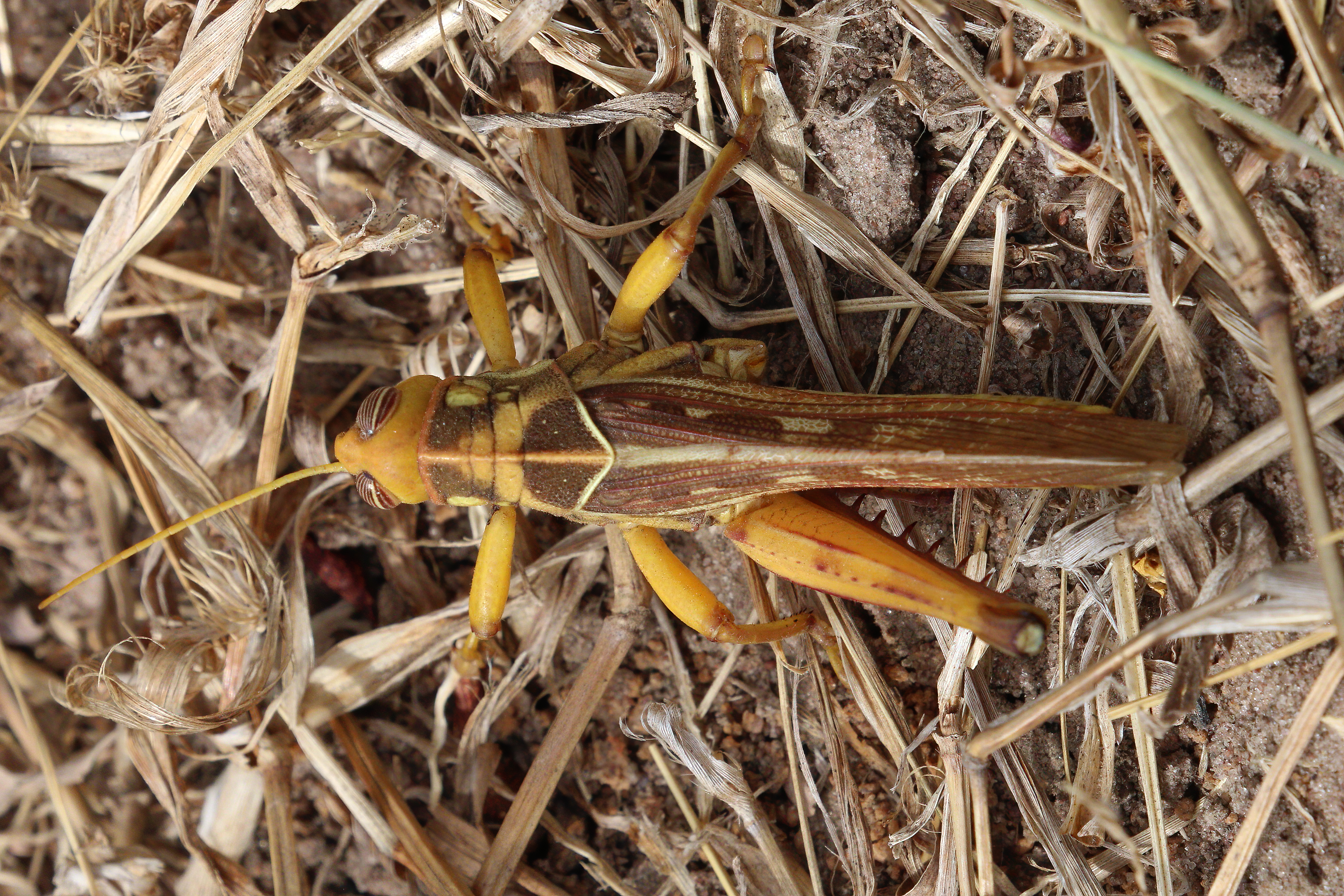
Kraussaria angulifera in Senegal
