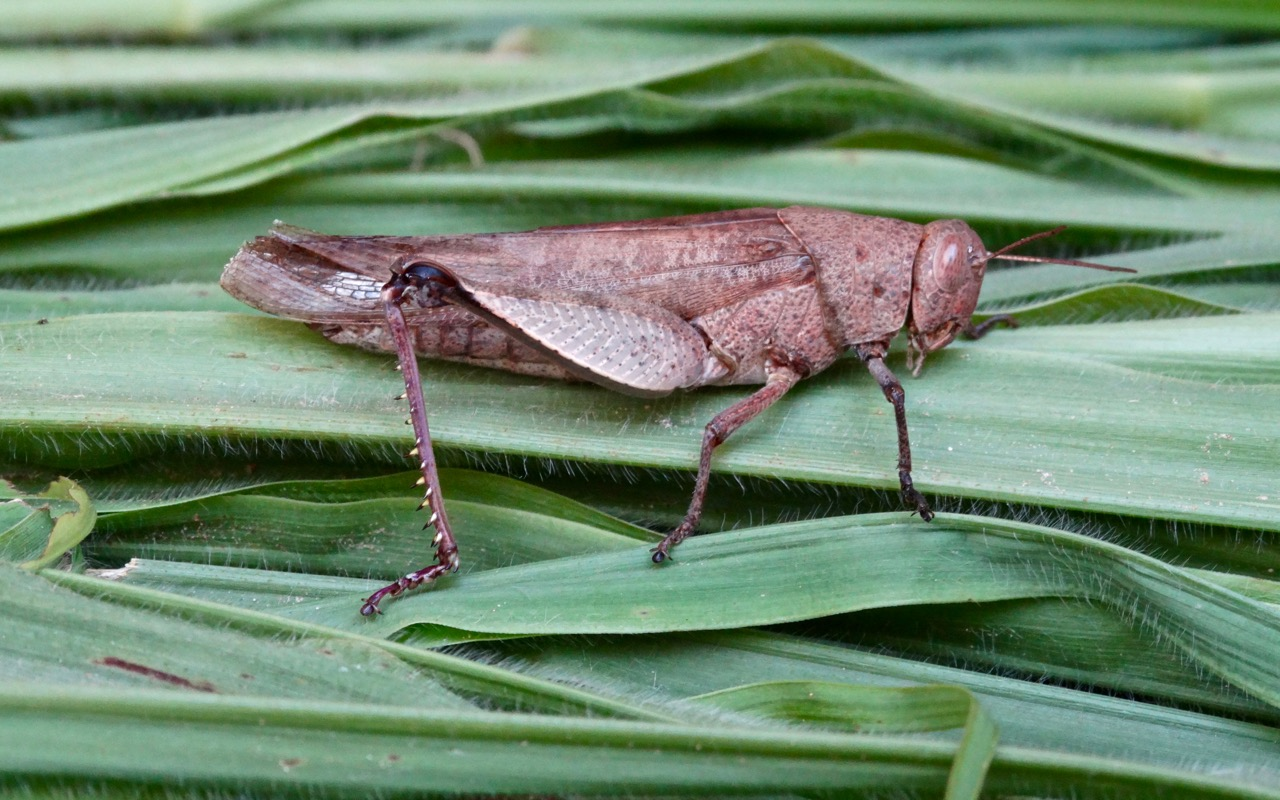
- Acridoderes strenuus

Scientific classification
- Kingdom: Animalia
- Phylum: Arthropoda
- Clade: Pancrustacea
- Class: Insecta
- Order: Orthoptera
- Suborder: Caelifera
- Family: Acrididae
- Subfamily: Cyrtacanthacridinae
- Genus: Acridoderes; Bolívar, 1889

Type species
- Acridoderes crassus Bolívar, 1889

Synonyms
- Anacridoderes Uvarov, 1923; Phyxacra Karny, 1907

= Acridoderes =

Genus of grasshoppers

Acridoderes is a genus of grasshoppers in the subfamily Cyrtacanthacridinae with species found in Africa.

== Species ==
The following species are recognised in the genus Acridoderes:

- Acridoderes arthriticus (Serville, 1838)
- Acridoderes coerulans (Karny, 1907)
- Acridoderes crassus Bolívar, 1889
- Acridoderes laevigatus Bolívar, 1911
- Acridoderes renkensis (Karny, 1907)
- Acridoderes sanguinea (Sjöstedt, 1929)
- Acridoderes strenuus (Walker, 1870)
- Acridoderes uvarovi (Miller, 1925)
