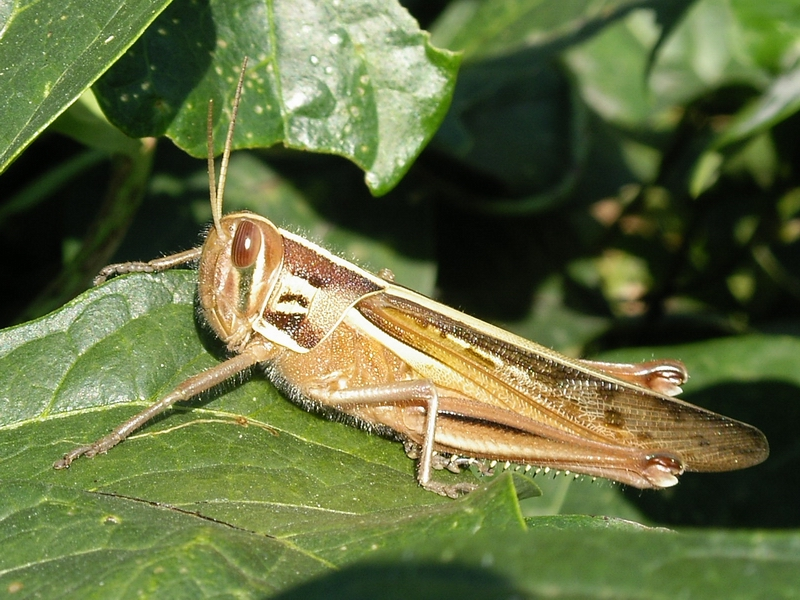

Scientific classification
- Kingdom: Animalia
- Phylum: Arthropoda
- Clade: Pancrustacea
- Class: Insecta
- Order: Orthoptera
- Suborder: Caelifera
- Family: Acrididae
- Genus: Patanga
- Species: P. japonica

Binomial name
- Patanga japonica (Bolivar, 1898)

= Patanga japonica =

Species of grasshopper

Patanga japonica is a species of grasshopper found in Japan, the Korean Peninsula, Vietnam, and China. This species overwinters as adults and has a univoltine life cycle, meaning there is only one generation per year.
