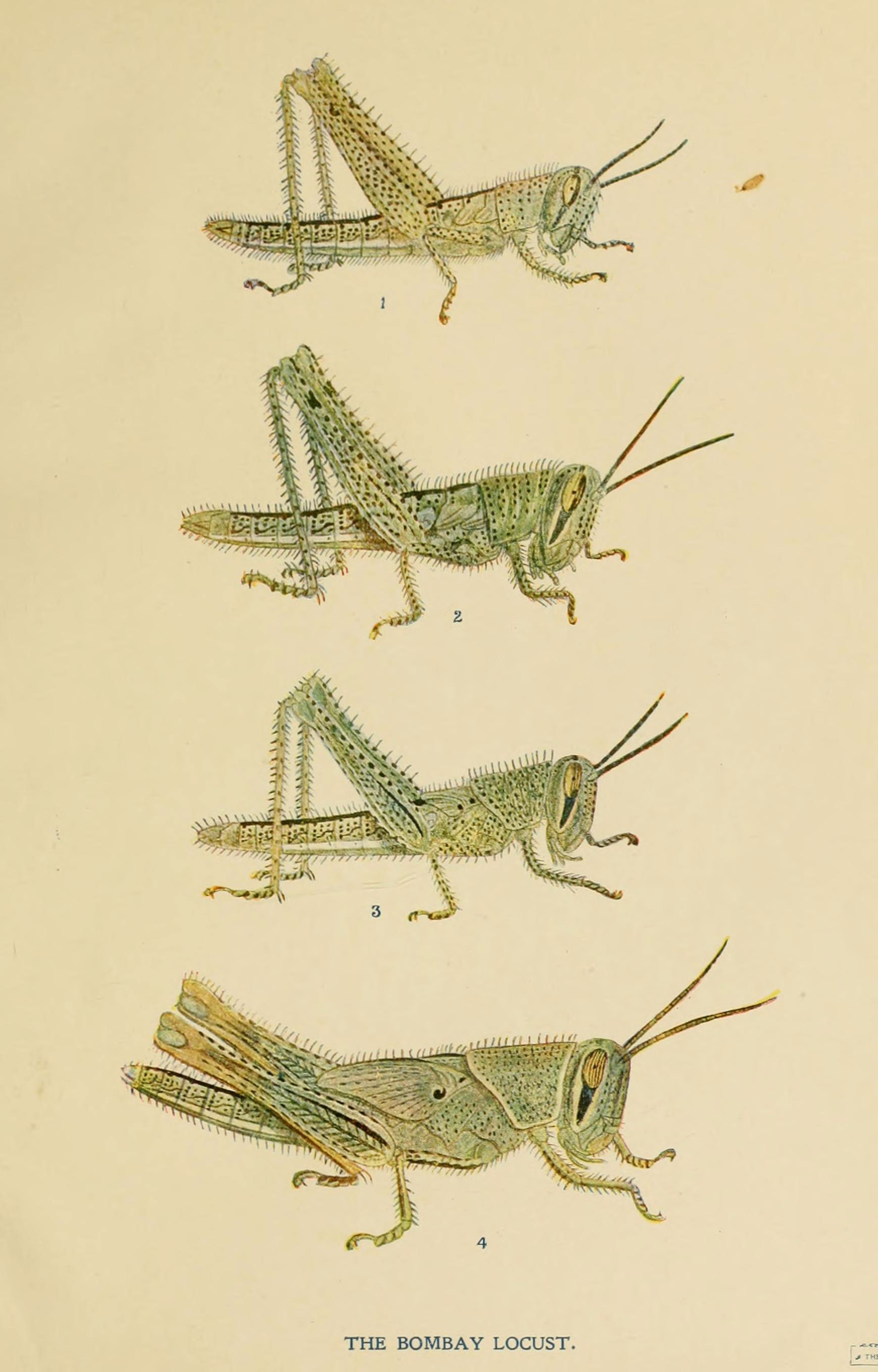
- Illustrations from Indian Insect Life (1909)
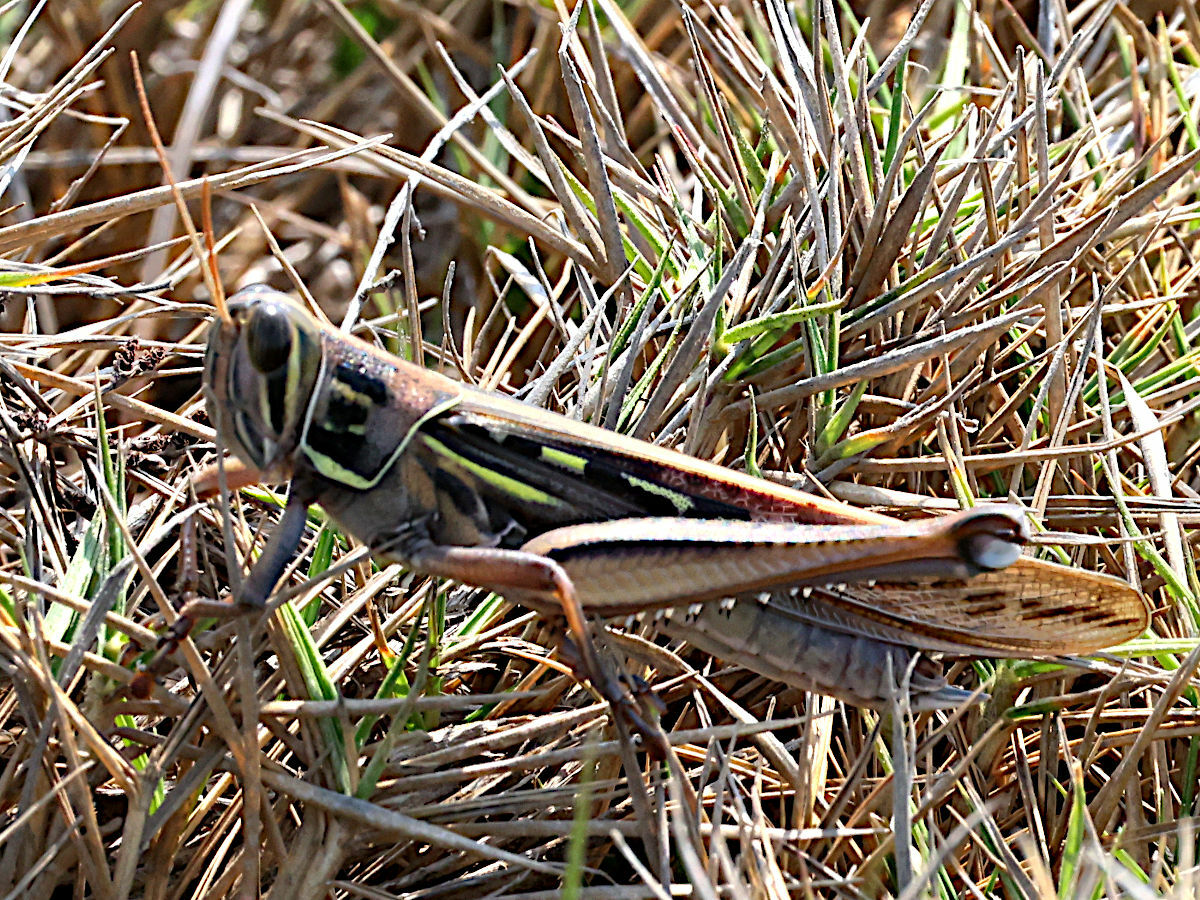
- In Penghu, Taiwan

Scientific classification
- Kingdom: Animalia
- Phylum: Arthropoda
- Clade: Pancrustacea
- Class: Insecta
- Order: Orthoptera
- Suborder: Caelifera
- Family: Acrididae
- Genus: Patanga
- Species: P. succincta

Binomial name
- Patanga succincta (Johannson, 1763)

Synonyms
- Acridium succincta; Cyrtacanthacris succincta; Gryllus succinctus; Nomadacris succincta; Orthacanthacris succincta

= Patanga succincta =

Species of locust

Patanga succincta, the Bombay locust, is a species of locust found in India and southeast Asia. Usually a solitary insect, only in India has it has exhibited swarming behaviour. The last plague of this locust was in that country between 1901 and 1908 and there have not been any swarms since 1927. It is thought that the behaviour of the insects has altered because of changing practices in agricultural land use.

== Description ==
Newly hatched Bombay locust nymphs are green with black spots. After they have grown and shed their skin several times they become more variable in colour. Some are plain green, and others are either orange-brown or green with a black spot at the base of each wingpad. The immature adults are at first pale brown with a yellowish dorsal stripe and a dark-coloured prothorax with two lateral pale bands. After six to eight weeks the general colour becomes darker and changes to a rosy red colour, particularly noticeable on the hind wings. When the locusts become mature the following year, they turn dark brown.

== Distribution and habitat ==
The Bombay locust is found in India, Southwest Asia and Southeast Asia. Its range extends from India and Pakistan to Thailand, Malaysia, Vietnam, Japan, the Philippines and Indonesia. Its typical breeding habitat is grassy plains and rough, tussocky grassland with shrubs and scattered trees at elevations up to about 1,500 metres (4,900 ft). In India, where swarms were common at one time, there have not been any swarms since 1927; it is thought this is due to a change of land use, with the areas of grassland in which it used to breed now being largely under cultivation. In some other parts of its range, where it does not form swarms, it has become an important local pest after forest clearance.

== Life cycle ==
On becoming an adult, the Bombay locust enters a diapause which lasts throughout the cool dry season. With the coming of the rains the insect becomes mature and starts to breed. In southern Japan, for example, it remains in diapause from June to March. It has been shown that it is the increased day length in the spring that triggers the change to reproductive status. In India it breeds in June and July, in Malaysia in August and September, and in Thailand in March and April.

Females lay one to four pods, each containing up to 150 eggs, in soft soil. These hatch 4 to 8 weeks later, depending on locality, and the nymphs pass through about seven developmental stages over a period of several months, before becoming immature adults. There is a single generation each year. In Thailand, the young nymphs feed on short grasses but after about the third moult they move into crops such as maize. In the morning they feed in full sun at the top of the plant, by midday they have moved down into cooler, shadier locations, and in the evening they move upward again, congregating on the sunny west-facing side of the plant. The immature adults of non-swarming populations congregate on a few adjacent maize plants, flying briefly to another location if disturbed. After the maize is harvested, they move back to grassland.

== Swarming behaviour ==
The Bombay locust has only exhibited swarming behaviour in India. The most recent plague lasted from 1901 to 1908 and the last recorded swarm was in 1927, since when the patterns of agriculture in the region have changed. When swarming, the insects spent the cool period from November to March in forested areas in the Western Ghats. In May, when the monsoon winds had started to blow, they moved northeastwards into Gujarat, Indore, Nagpur, Hyderabad and the Eastern Ghats, by then covering an area of 500,000 square kilometres (190,000 sq mi). If the rains failed to arrive in June, the plague continued to move with the wind, sometimes as far as Orissa, Bihar and Bengal. On the arrival of the rains, the swarms split up, the females laid their eggs and the insects died. The pods were typically laid in heavy clay soils in grassland, burned millet fields or the vacant strips of land between fields. The eggs hatched a few weeks later, and as the hoppers grew and developed into winged adults, they fed on grasses or moved into ripening millet crops. Northeasterly winds blowing in October and November transported the immature adults back to the Western Ghats, mostly feeding by day and moving at night.
