= Anti-Locust Research Centre =

UK research institute founded 1945

The Anti-Locust Research Centre (ALRC) was set up in London, United Kingdom, by the Colonial Office in 1945, with the aim of improving the worldwide forecasting and control of locusts. The Russian-British entomologist Boris Uvarov was appointed as its first director. Prior to that, Uvarov had been in charge of a small locust research unit in London, formed in the 1920s within the Imperial Bureau of Entomology. The unit later became known as the Centre for Overseas Pest Research.

During World War II, the ALRC concentrated on its forecasting and advisory services with regard to anti-locust campaigns in the Middle East and Africa. After the war it became a dedicated research centre on locusts, making important contributions in the areas of taxonomy, population biology and locust control. Its primary aims at this time were the coordination of international research into the biology of locusts and the organisation of international cooperation in the control of locusts.

In 1964, both the ALRC and the Imperial Bureau of Entomology became part of the Ministry of Overseas Development. By 1990 they had been amalgamated with other organisations, been relocated to Chatham and became the Natural Resources Institute (NRI). In 1996, management of the NRI was transferred to the University of Greenwich.
