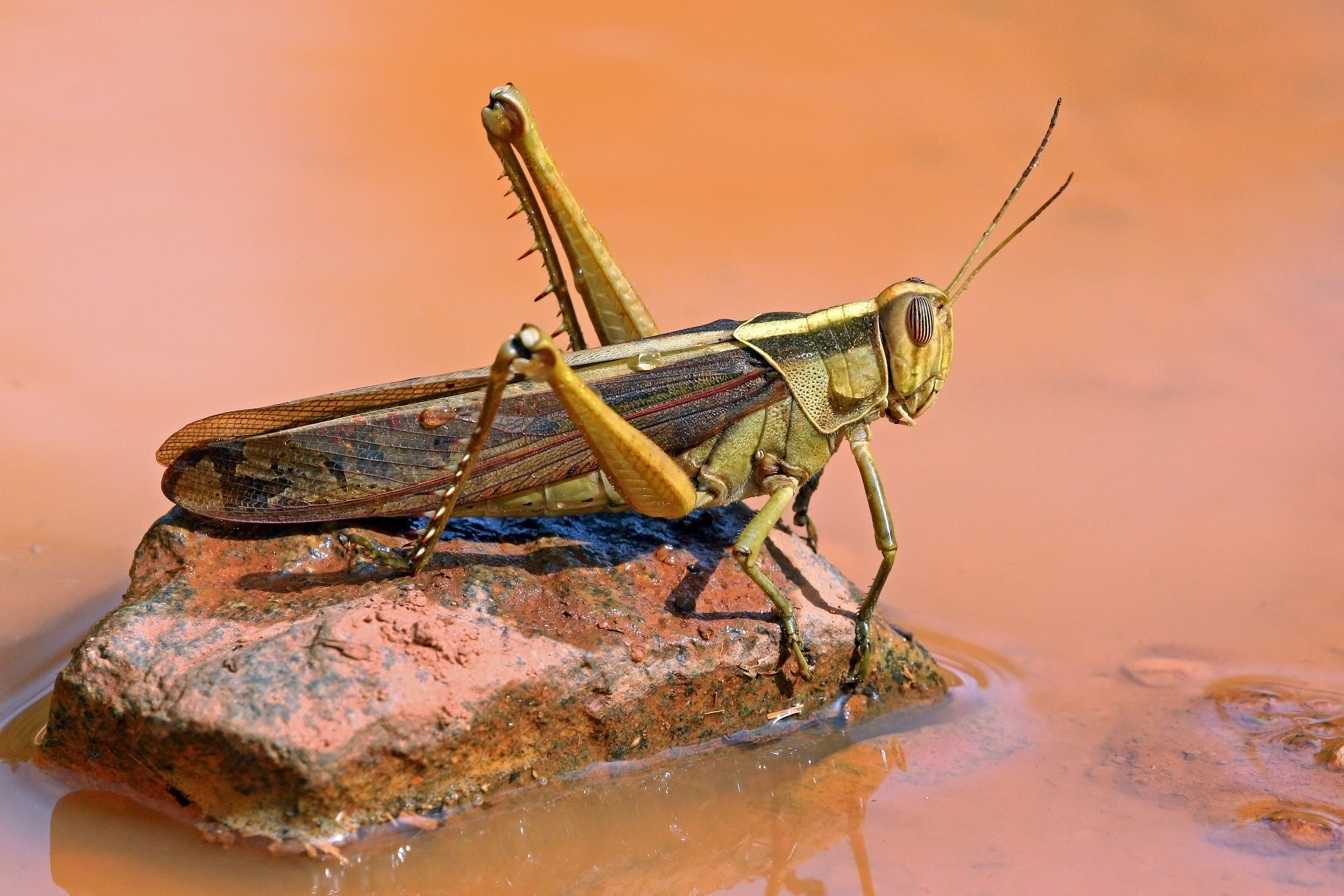

Conservation status
- Least Concern (IUCN 3.1)

Scientific classification
- Kingdom: Animalia
- Phylum: Arthropoda
- Clade: Pancrustacea
- Class: Insecta
- Order: Orthoptera
- Suborder: Caelifera
- Family: Acrididae
- Genus: Acanthacris
- Species: A. ruficornis

Binomial name
- Acanthacris ruficornis (Fabricius, 1787)

= Acanthacris ruficornis =

Species of grasshopper

Acanthacris ruficornis is a species of bird grasshopper in the family Acrididae. It is found in Africa, the Arabian Peninsula, and southern Europe, particularly southern Spain.

== Subspecies ==
These subspecies belong to the species Acanthacris ruficornis:

- Acanthacris ruficornis citrina (Serville, 1838)
- Acanthacris ruficornis ruficornis (Fabricius, 1787) (Garden Locust)
