= Ritchiella =

Scientific classification
- Domain: Eukaryota
- Kingdom: Animalia
- Phylum: Arthropoda
- Class: Insecta
- Order: Orthoptera
- Suborder: Caelifera
- Family: Acrididae
- Subfamily: Cyrtacanthacridinae
- Genus: Ritchiella; Mungai, 1992

Type species
- Acridium sanguineum Sjöstedt, 1912

Genus of grasshoppers

Ritchiella is a genus of grasshoppers in the subfamily Cyrtacanthacridinae with species found in Africa.

== Species ==
The following species are recognised in the genus Ritchiella:

- Ritchiella asperata (Bolívar, 1882)
- Ritchiella baumanni (Karsch, 1896)
- Ritchiella rungwensis Mungai, 1992
- Ritchiella sanguinea (Sjöstedt, 1912)
- Ritchiella uvarovi (Sjöstedt, 1924)
