= Boris Uvarov =

Russian–British entomologist (1886–1970)

Sir Boris Uvarov KCMG FRS
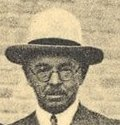
- B. P. Uvarov at the International Congress of Entomology in Madrid, 1935
- Born: Boris Petrovitch Uvarov; 3 November 1886; Ural'sk
- Died: 18 March 1970 (aged 83); London
- Education: Saint Petersburg State University
- Spouse: Anna Fedorovna Fedorova (Prodaniuk)
- Children: Evgenii (1910-1993)
- Awards: Fellow of the Royal Society (1950)

Sir Boris Petrovitch Uvarov KCMG FRS (3 November 1886 – 18 March 1970) was a Russian-British entomologist best known for his work on the biology and ecology of locusts. He has been called the father of acridology.

== Biography ==
Boris Petrovitch Uvarov was born in Ural'sk, in the Russian Empire (now Oral, Kazakhstan), the youngest of three sons of Pyotr P. Uvarov, a state bank employee, and his wife, Aleksandra. His interest in natural history was aided in young life by his father's gift of six volumes of Brehm's Tierleben. He went to a school in Uralsk from 1895 to 1902 where he was encouraged by S. M. Zhuravlev. He then studied briefly at the School of Mining at Ekaterinoslav (now Dnipro) but transferred in 1906 to study biology in the Saint Petersburg State University, graduating in 1910. He was influenced by the teachings of Shimkevitch, Wagner, and Palladin but enjoyed most the meetings of the Russian Entomological Society where he was influenced by, among others, D. N. Borodi, and A. A. Lyubishev. His first job after graduating was as an entomologist at the Murgab Crown Cotton Estate (Transcaucasia) but he moved to St Petersburg in 1911. He then worked at Stavropol on Locusta migratoria becoming director of the entomological bureau at the age of 23 and helped put locust control on a sound scientific basis. From 1915 he worked in Tiflis, which after the Russian revolution of 1917 had become the capital of the short-lived Democratic Republic of Georgia. With the rise of Georgian nationalism he found himself selling pies in the marketplace to supplement income. A chance meeting with a British army medical entomologist Patrick A. Buxton in Georgia who in turn contacted Guy A.K. Marshal in London led in 1920 to an invitation to join the Imperial Institute of Entomology. He moved to London along with his wife and son and would not visit Russia again until 1968. He became a naturalized British citizen in 1943.

Starting in 1945, Dr. Uvarov and his small team received official designation as the Anti-Locust Research Centre, London. During the next fourteen years, the Centre developed into the foremost laboratory in the world for research on locusts. His assistants included the sisters Zena and Nadia Waloff. The organization published profusely, collaborated with a wide range of scientists from around the world. He influenced the FAO to take an interest in the coordination of monitoring and research towards prediction and control of locusts. He personally published nearly 430 papers and made important contributions in the areas of taxonomy, population biology and locust control.

Uvarov's principal contribution was the phase theory of locusts. He identified the solitary and migratory phases and provided an ecological theory on what triggered their transformation. He suggested that environmental conditions could be controlled to prevent the transformation into the migratory phase. Throughout his career he and his team investigated the proximate and ultimate triggers for the phase transition. These included endocrinological, behavioural, and genetic studies.

== Honours ==
- Commander of the Order of St Michael and St George (1943)
- Knight Commander of the Most Distinguished Order of St Michael and St George (10 June 1961) for contributions to science, particularly as Director of the Anti-Locust Research Centre
- Fellow of the Royal Society (1950)
- Commander of the Royal Order of the Lion (Belgium, 1948)
- Honorary DSc from the University of Madrid (1935)
- President of the Royal Entomological Society of London (1959–61)

Uvarov was elected a Fellow of the Royal Society in 1950, his nomination reads:

His researches on taxonomy, morphology, biometrics and behaviour of locusts led him to formulate the phase theory respecting those insects, greatly influencing locus research throughout the world. It has also provided a basis for international policy of prevention of locust outbreaks. His studies of outbreaks in Africa contributed much towards establishing correlation between seasonal weather conditions and locus migrations thus providing a basis for forecasting. Other work includes over 150 papers on taxonomy of Orthoptera and many on Orthopterous faunas. Has also done much to encourage locust research and played a leading part in planning international anti-locus measures.

== Personal life ==
Uvarov's oldest brother Nikolai was sentenced to death in 1920. Nikolai's daughter Olga Uvarov (1910–2001) was brought from Russia to London in 1923 with the help of the International Red Cross.

== Selected works ==
- Uvarov, Boris-Petrovich. "A revision of the genus Locusta, L.(= Pachytylus, Fieb.), with a new theory as to the periodicity and migrations of locusts." Bulletin of entomological Research 12.2 (1921): 135-163.
- Uvarov, Boris Petrovich. "Locusts and Grasshoppers. A handbook for their study and control." Locusts and Grasshoppers. A Handbook for their Study and Control. (1928).
- Uvarov, Boris P., and Boris N. Zolotarevsky. "Phases of locusts and their interrelations." Bulletin of Entomological Research 20.3 (1929): 261-265.
- Uvarov, Boris Petrovitch. "Insects and climate." Transactions of the Royal Entomological Society of London 79.pt. 1 (1931).
- Uvarov, Boris. Grasshoppers and locusts. A handbook of general acridology Vol. 2. Behaviour, ecology, biogeography, population dynamics. Centre for Overseas Pest Research, 1977.
