= S. camerata =

S. camerata may refer to:

- Sapheneutis camerata, a bagworm species
- Schistocerca camerata, a grasshopper species

== See also ==
- Camerata (disambiguation)
