= C. robusta =

C. robusta may refer to:

- Calceolispongia robusta, a cladid crinoid species that lived along the shores of eastern Gondwanaland that correspond to Timor and Western Australia, today
- Camerata robusta, a flat worm species
- Ceratozamia robusta, a plant species found in Belize, Guatemala and Mexico
- Cheungbeia robusta, a sea snail species
- Chorizanthe robusta, a flowering plant species endemic to California
- Compsomantis robusta, a praying mantis species found in Borneo
- Conraua robusta, a frog species found in Cameroon and Nigeria
- Coprosma robusta, the karamu, a tree species found in New Zealand
- Crateroscelis robusta, the mountain mouse-warbler, a bird species found in Indonesia and Papua New Guinea

== Synonyms ==
- Coffea robusta, a synonym for Coffea canephora, the robusta coffee, a plant species which has its origins in central and western subsaharan Africa
