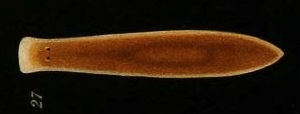
- Uteriporus vulgaris

Scientific classification
- Domain: Eukaryota
- Kingdom: Animalia
- Phylum: Platyhelminthes
- Order: Tricladida
- Family: Uteriporidae
- Subfamily: Uteriporinae; Böhmig, 1906

Genera
- See text

= Uteriporinae =

Subfamily of flatworms

Uteriporinae is a subfamily of Maricola triclads.

== Genera ==
List of known genera:

- Allogenus
- Camerata
- Dinizia
- Foviella
- Leucolesma
- Micaplana
- Nexilis
- Uteriporus
- Vatapa
