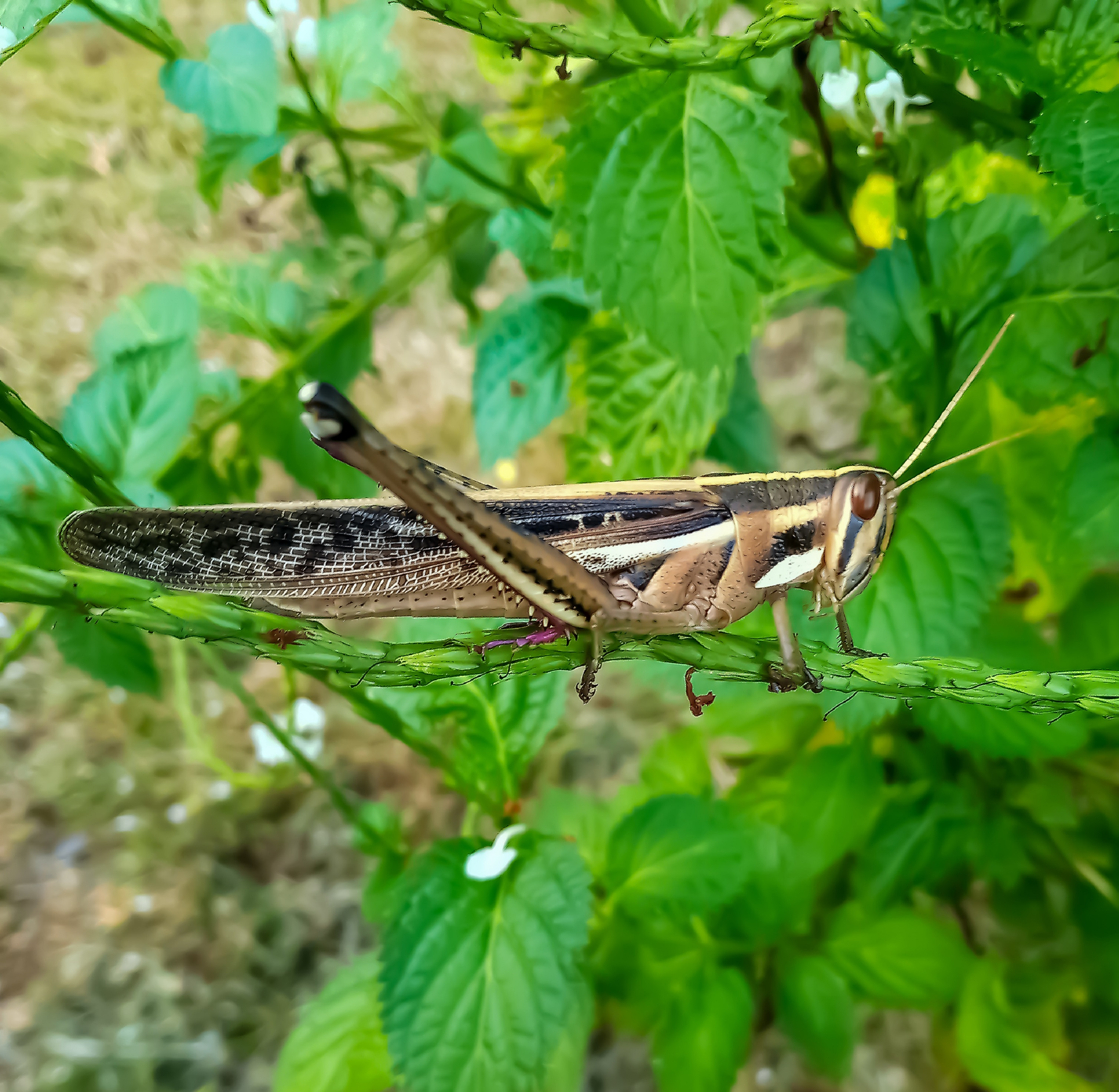

Scientific classification
- Kingdom: Animalia
- Phylum: Arthropoda
- Clade: Pancrustacea
- Class: Insecta
- Order: Orthoptera
- Suborder: Caelifera
- Family: Acrididae
- Subfamily: Cyrtacanthacridinae
- Tribe: Cyrtacanthacridini
- Genus: Schistocerca
- Species: S. pallens

Binomial name
- Schistocerca pallens (Thunberg, 1815)

Synonyms
- Schistocerca formosa Bruner, L., 1911; Schistocerca gratissima Rehn JAG 1908; Schistocerca vittafrons Bruner, L., 1908; Schistocerca idonea Scudder SH, 1899; Cyrtacanthacris pectoralis Walker F, 1870; Cyrtacanthacris viridescens Walker F, 1870; Acridium pallens (Thunberg, 1815); Gryllus pallens Thunberg, 1815

= Schistocerca pallens =

Species of grasshopper

Schistocerca pallens is a large “bird grasshopper” in the subfamily Cyrtacanthacridinae that occurs throughout tropical America. It is closely related to Schistocerca cancellata but shows no swarming behaviour or locust phase polymorphism, even under crowded laboratory conditions. Although not a swarming locust, it can occur at sufficiently high densities to cause economic damage. It is mainly a pest of sugar cane, but has also been recorded as damaging almond, banana, beans, breadfruit, carnauba wax palm, chickpeas, coconut palms, cotton, forage crops, groundnuts, indigo, legumes, maize, onions, rice, sorghum, sweet potato and tomatoes.

== Gallery ==
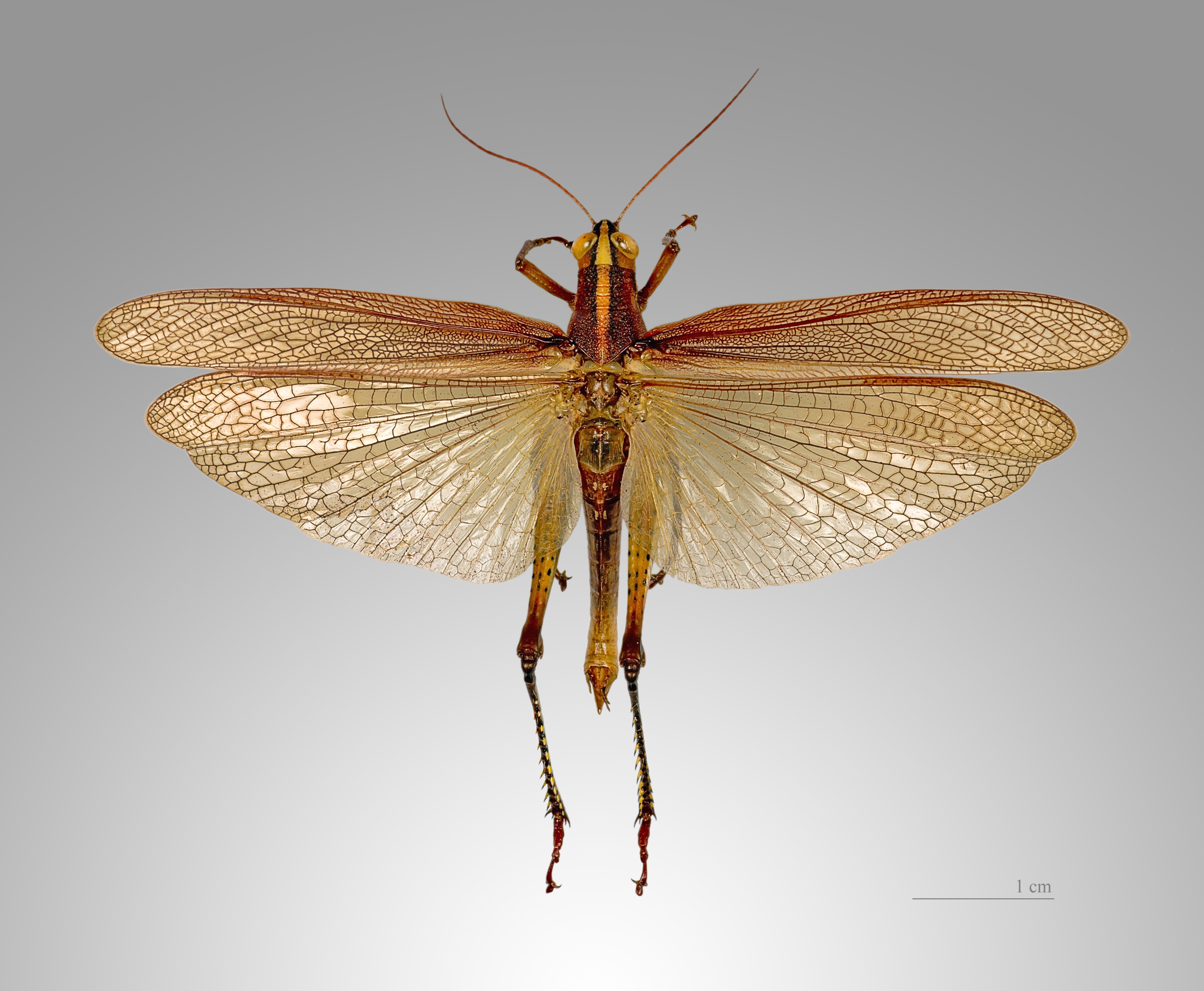

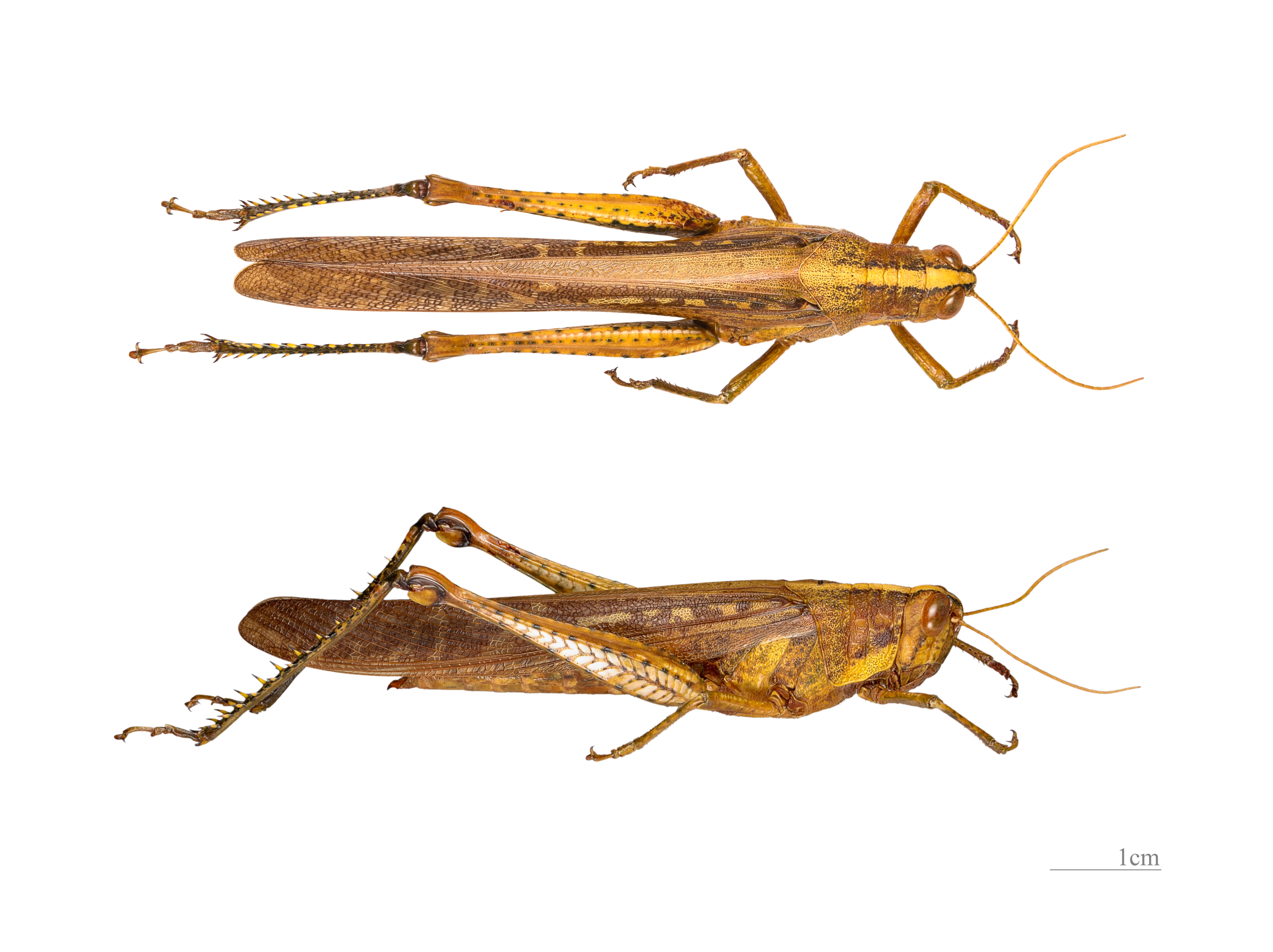
