= Chambered =

Chambered is an adjective related to the word chamber. It may refer to:

- Chambered body, an element of some electric guitars
- Chambered cairn or Chambered long barrow, types of megalithic burial monument
- Chambered nautilus (Nautilus pompilius), the best-known species of nautilus
- Chambered stinkhorn (Lysurus periphragmoides), a species of fungus
- Three chambered heart or Four chambered heart, types of hearts
- The Four-Chambered Heart, a 1950 autobiographical novel

== See also ==
- Camerata (disambiguation), the Latin equivalent of the word
