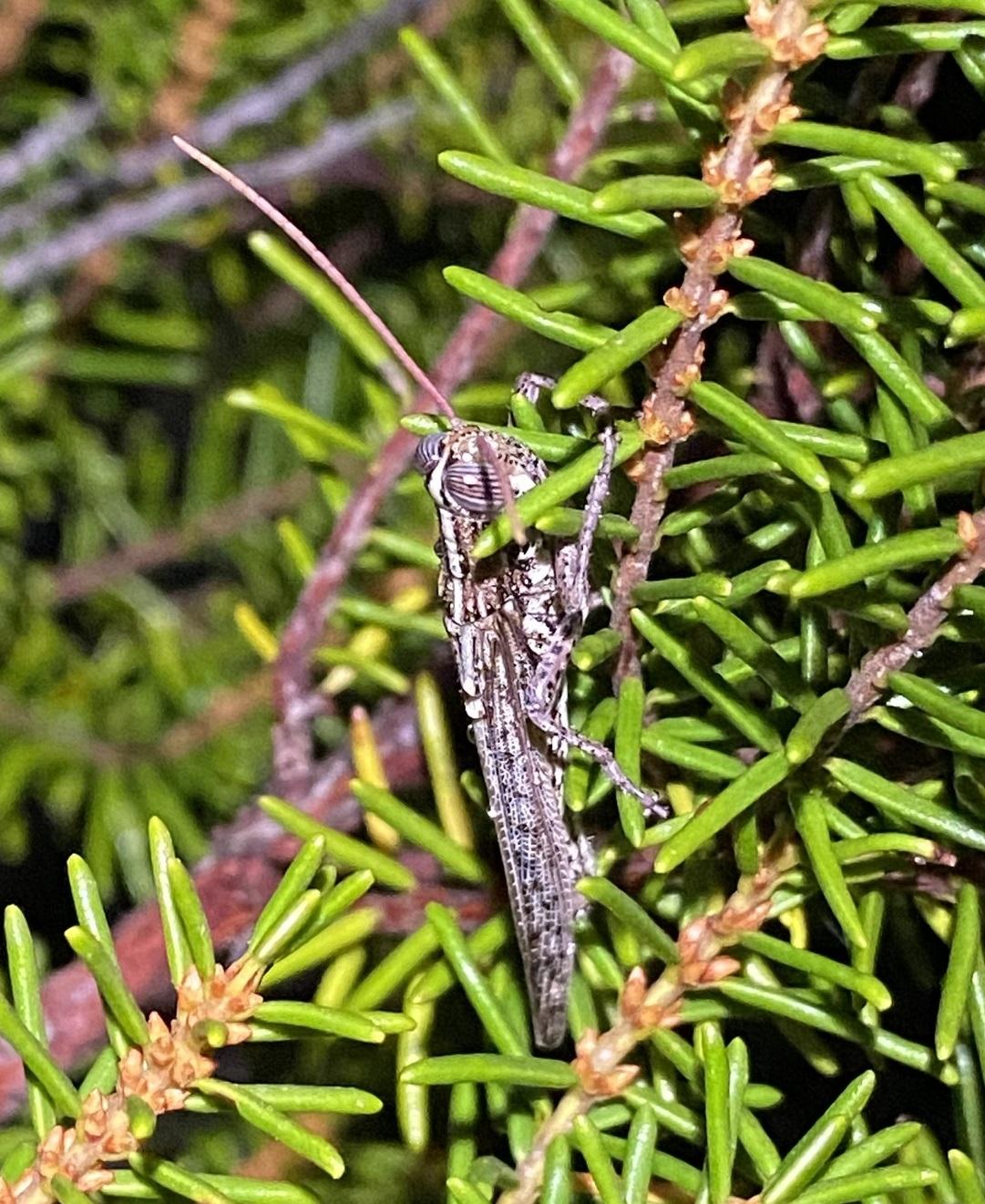

Scientific classification
- Kingdom: Animalia
- Phylum: Arthropoda
- Clade: Pancrustacea
- Class: Insecta
- Order: Orthoptera
- Suborder: Caelifera
- Family: Acrididae
- Subfamily: Cyrtacanthacridinae
- Tribe: Cyrtacanthacridini
- Genus: Schistocerca
- Species: S. ceratiola

Binomial name
- Schistocerca ceratiola Hubbell & Walker, 1928

= Schistocerca ceratiola =

Species of grasshopper

Schistocerca ceratiola, the rosemary grasshopper, is a species of bird grasshopper in the family Acrididae. It is endemic to the Florida scrub in Florida.
