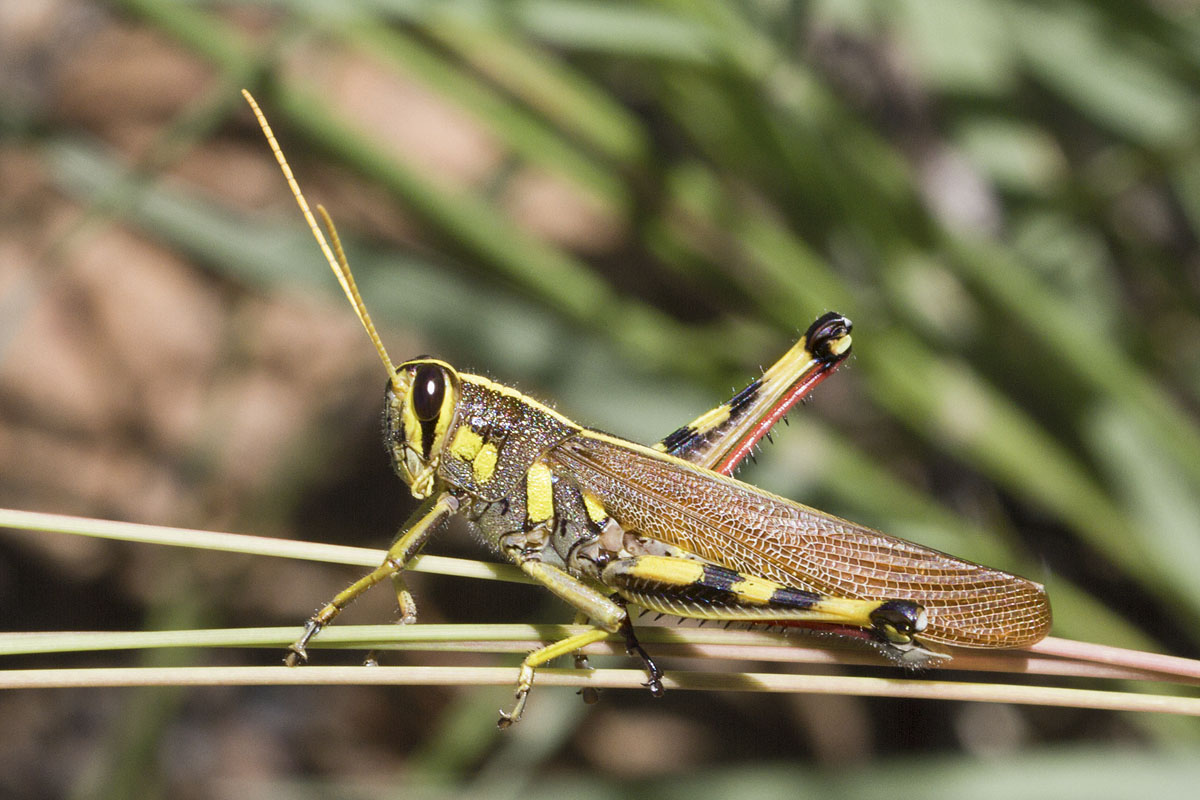

Scientific classification
- Kingdom: Animalia
- Phylum: Arthropoda
- Clade: Pancrustacea
- Class: Insecta
- Order: Orthoptera
- Suborder: Caelifera
- Family: Acrididae
- Subfamily: Cyrtacanthacridinae
- Tribe: Cyrtacanthacridini
- Genus: Schistocerca
- Species: S. albolineata

Binomial name
- Schistocerca albolineata (Thomas, 1875)

= Schistocerca albolineata =

Species of grasshopper

Schistocerca albolineata, the white-lined bird grasshopper, is a species of bird grasshopper in the family Acrididae. It is found in North America, often near the U.S.-Mexico border.
