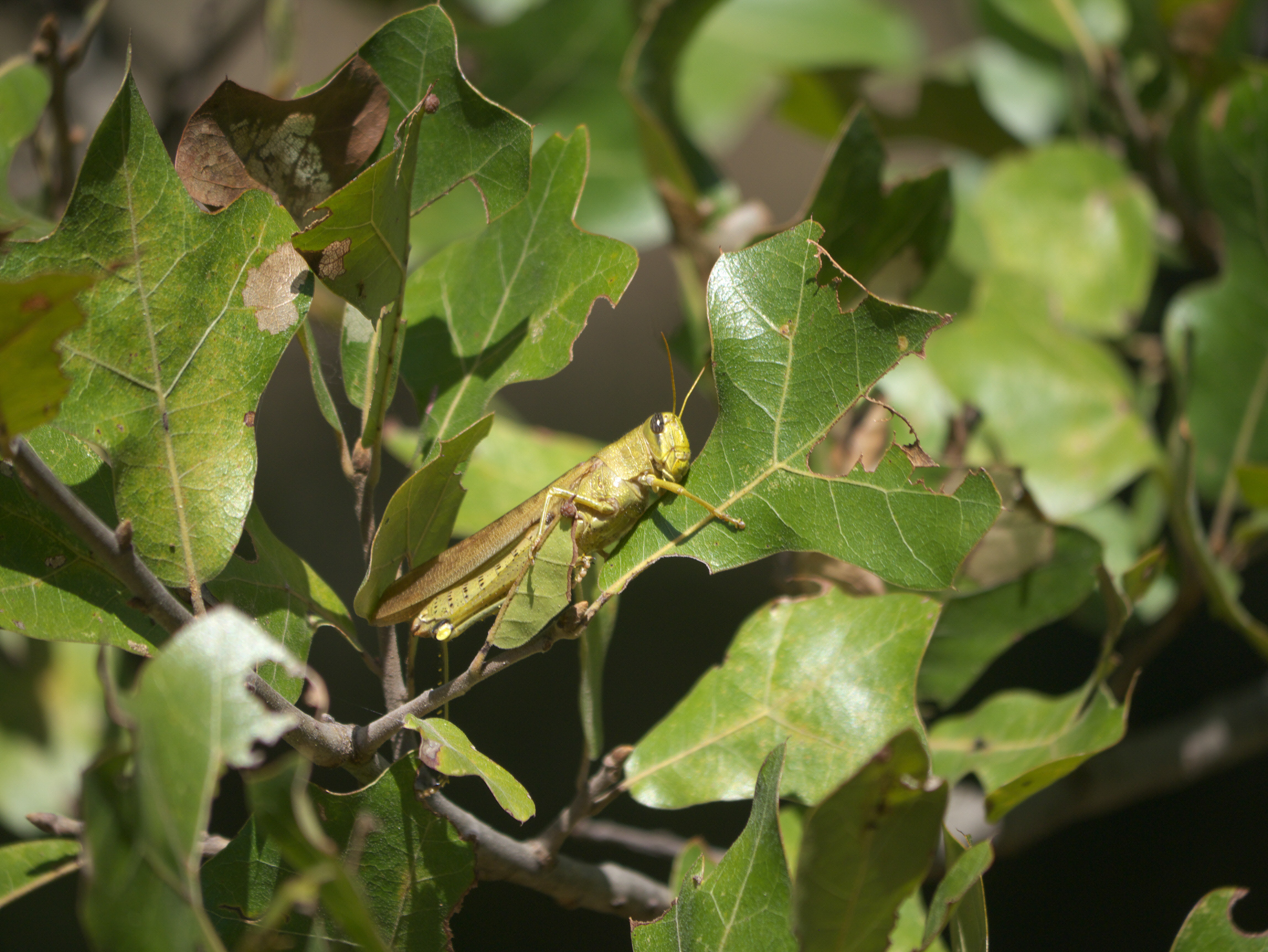

Scientific classification
- Kingdom: Animalia
- Phylum: Arthropoda
- Clade: Pancrustacea
- Class: Insecta
- Order: Orthoptera
- Suborder: Caelifera
- Family: Acrididae
- Tribe: Cyrtacanthacridini
- Genus: Schistocerca
- Species: S. lineata

Binomial name
- Schistocerca lineata Scudder, 1899

= Schistocerca lineata =

Species of grasshopper

Schistocerca lineata, known generally as the spotted bird grasshopper or birdwing grasshopper, is a species of bird grasshopper in the family Acrididae. It is found in North America.

== Habitat ==
S. lineata can be found across North America, specifically in Canada, the United States, and Mexico.

They can be found in a variety of habitats, but typically prefer dry to semi-dry environments with trees and shrubs, and are abundant in sandy areas.

== Ecotypes ==
S. lineata has four described ecotypes: typical, brown, aposematic, and olive green.

Typical ecotype Typical ecotype of S. lineata
Geographic distribution	Great Plains region
Head	Light to greenish brown with stripes below the eyes
Dorsal stripe	Light yellow
Epimeron	Has small yellow spots
Forewings	Brown with light brown veins
Hind femur	Light brown with no upper bands. Has a row of black dots along the carinula, but no dots on the carina
Hind tibia	Black along the underside, with blacked-tipped yellow tibial spines

Brown ecotype Brown ecotype of S. lineata
Geographic distribution	Great Lakes region
Head	Brown with faint stripes below the eyes
Dorsal stripe	Absent
Epimeron	No pattern
Forewings	Brown with light brown veins and patchy spots
Hind femur	Brown with no upper bands. Has a row of black dots along the carinula, and sometimes has a row of dots along the upper carina
Hind tibia	Light brown with blacked-tipped yellow tibial spines

Aposematic ecotype Aposematic ecotype of S. lineata
Geographic distribution	Southwestern United States
Head	Yellow with black stripes bellow the eyes
Dorsal stripe	Yellow
Epimeron	Entirely yellow with some black grooves
Forewings	Yellowish brown with some patchiness and brown veins
Hind femur	Light brown to yellow with clearly visible upper black bands. The carinula sometimes has a row of very small black dots, while the upper carina typically doesn’t have any dots
Hind tibia	Black especially on the upper side, with blacked-tipped yellow tibial spines

Olive green ecotype Olive Green ecotype of S. lineata
Geographic distribution	Western United States
Head	Olive green with dark green stripes below the eyes
Dorsal stripe	Bright yellow
Epimeron	Small yellow spots
Forewings	Light brown to olive green, with yellow veins
Hind femur	Olive green that sometimes has upper bands. The carinula sometimes has a row of black dots, but they are usually absent. The upper carina also sometimes has dots, but they too are usually absent
Hind tibia	Pinkish red with blacked-tipped yellow tibial spines

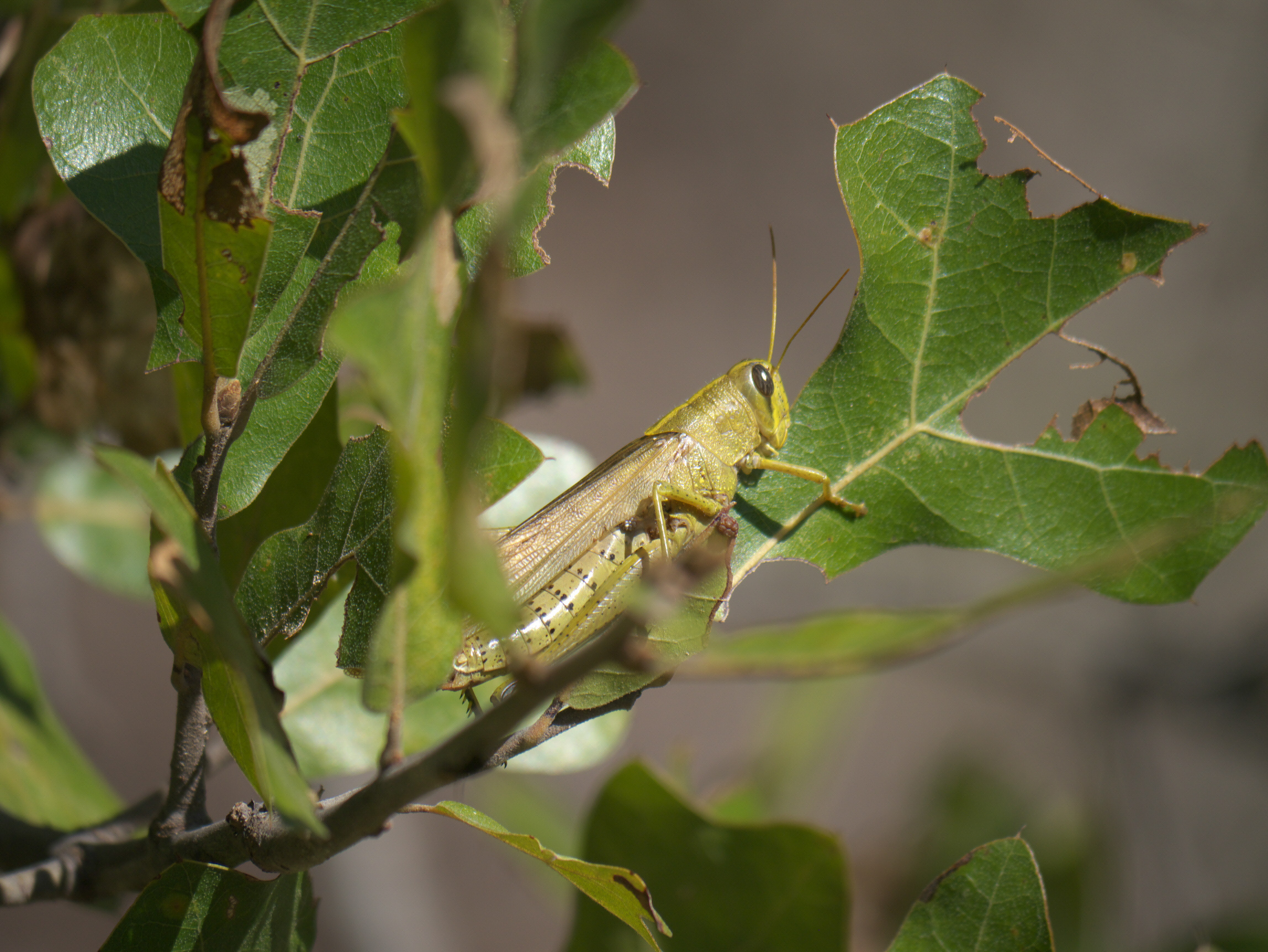
Spotted bird grasshopper, Schistocerca lineata
