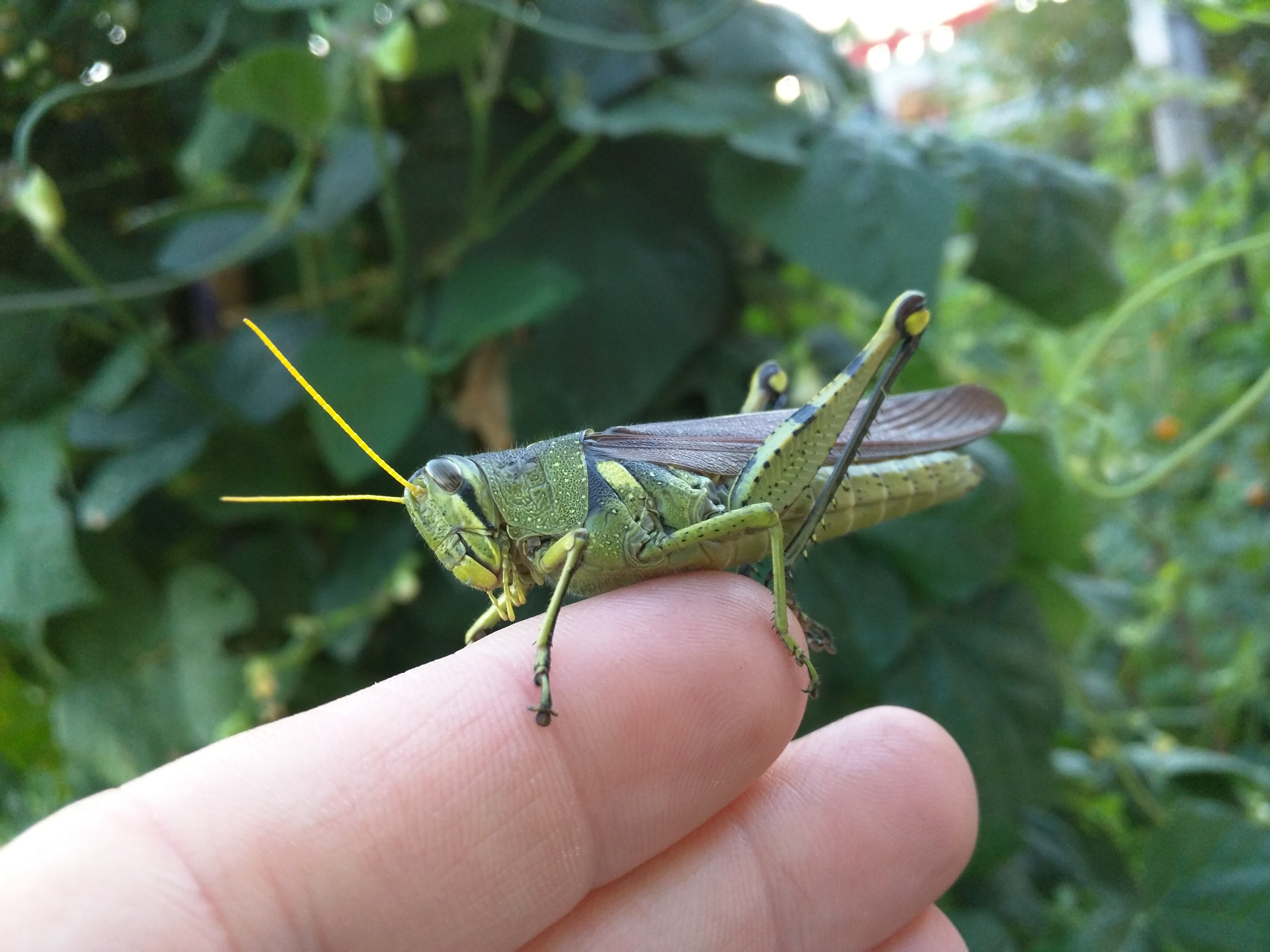

Scientific classification
- Kingdom: Animalia
- Phylum: Arthropoda
- Clade: Pancrustacea
- Class: Insecta
- Order: Orthoptera
- Suborder: Caelifera
- Family: Acrididae
- Subfamily: Cyrtacanthacridinae
- Tribe: Cyrtacanthacridini
- Genus: Schistocerca
- Species: S. alutacea

Binomial name
- Schistocerca alutacea (Harris, 1841)

= Schistocerca alutacea =

Species of grasshopper

Schistocerca alutacea, the leather-colored bird grasshopper, is a species of grasshopper in the family Acrididae. The species occurs in the United States, from Massachusetts to Arizona and Florida.

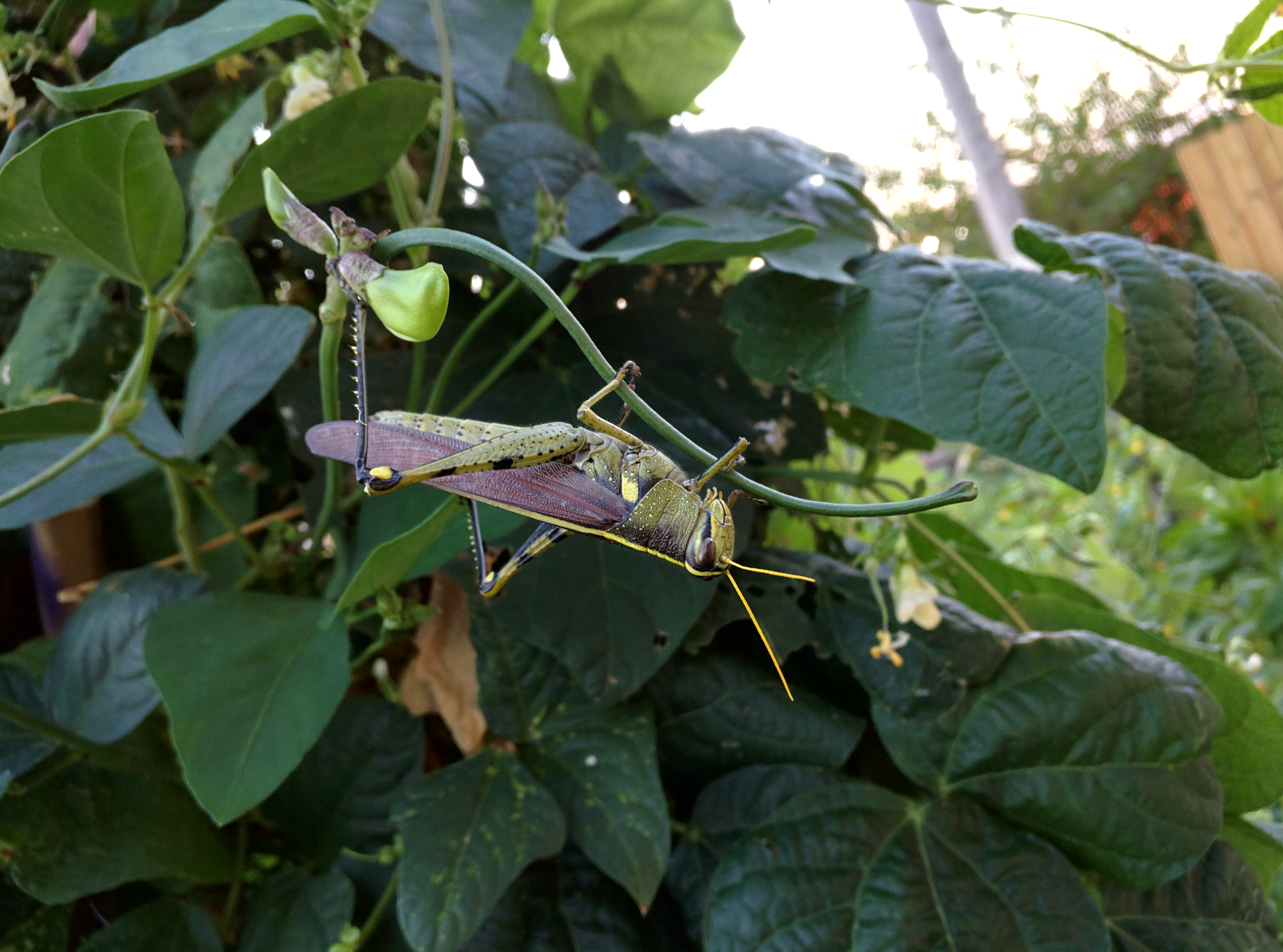
