= Sapheneutis =

Scientific classification
- Kingdom: Animalia
- Phylum: Arthropoda
- Class: Insecta
- Order: Lepidoptera
- Family: Psychidae
- Subfamily: Psychinae
- Genus: Sapheneutis; Meyrick, 1907

Type species
- Sapheneutis camerata Meyrick, 1907

Genus of moths

Sapheneutis is a bagworm genus.

== Species ==
- Sapheneutis camerata Meyrick, 1907 (from Sri Lanka)
- Sapheneutis certificata Meyrick, 1918 (from South Africa)
- Sapheneutis cineracea Meyrick, 1915 (from Taiwan)
- Sapheneutis crocotricha Meyrick, 1910 (from India)
- Sapheneutis colocynthia Meyrick, 1916 (from India)
- Sapheneutis galactodes Meyrick, 1915 (from Malawi)
- Sapheneutis galerita Meyrick, 1911 (from India)
- Sapheneutis metacentra Meyrick, 1907 (from Sri Lanka)
- Sapheneutis pulchella Sobczyk & Schütte, 2010 (from Madagascar)
- Sapheneutis terricola Meyrick, 1915 (from Malawi)
- Sapheneutis thlipsias Meyrick, 1915 (from Malawi)
