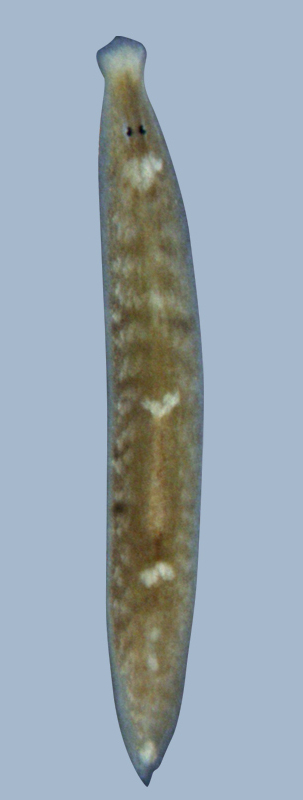
- Paucumara trigonocephala

Scientific classification
- Domain: Eukaryota
- Kingdom: Animalia
- Phylum: Platyhelminthes
- Order: Tricladida
- Family: Uteriporidae
- Subfamily: Ectoplaninae; Bresslau, 1933

Genera
- See text

= Ectoplaninae =

Subfamily of flatworms

Ectoplaninae is a subfamily of Maricola triclads.

== Genera ==
List of known genera:

- Ectoplana
- Miroplana
- Nesion
- Obrimoposthia
- Ostenocula
- Paucumara
- Procerodella
- Sluysia
- Tryssosoma
