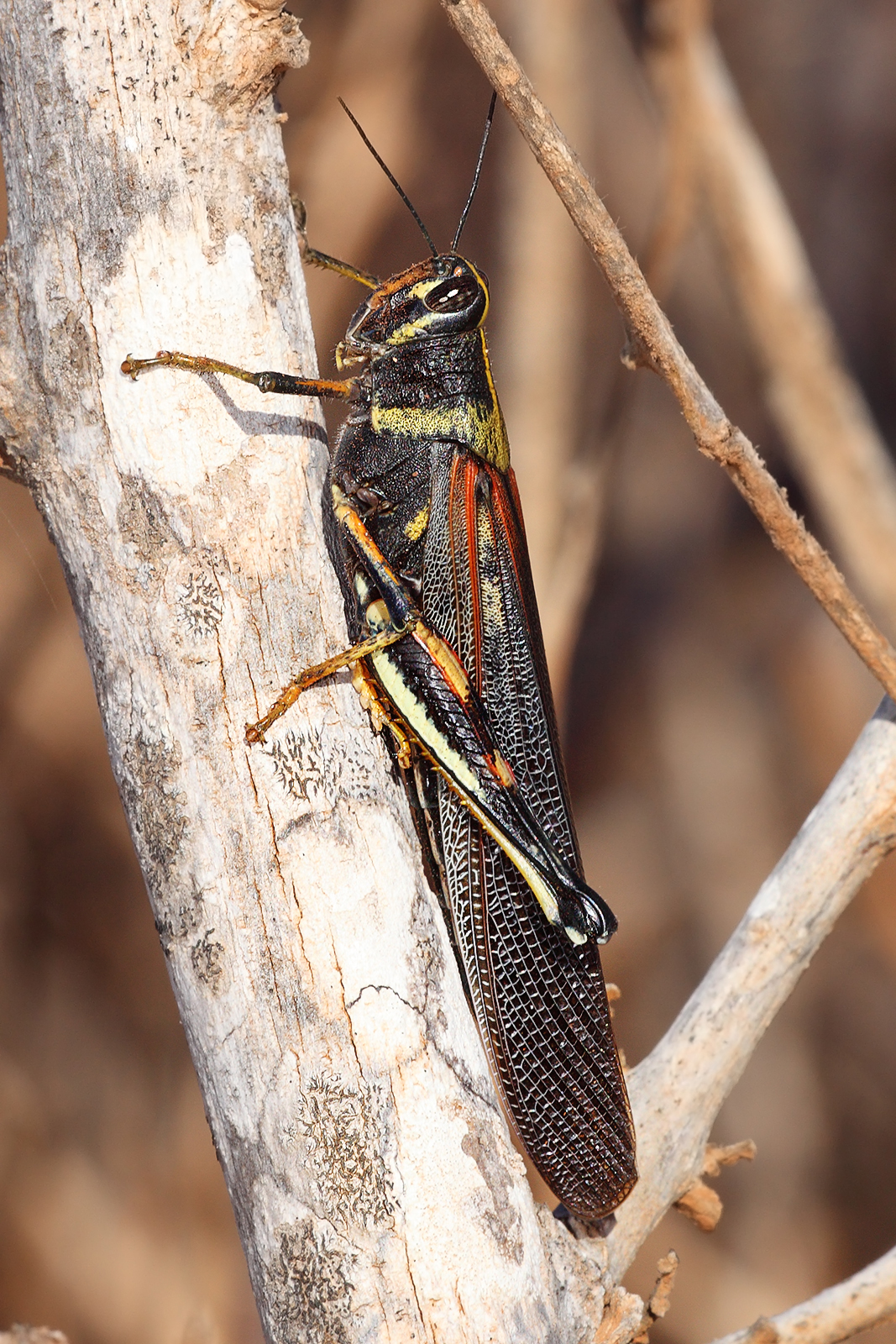
- Photographed on North Seymour Island

Scientific classification
- Kingdom: Animalia
- Phylum: Arthropoda
- Clade: Pancrustacea
- Class: Insecta
- Order: Orthoptera
- Suborder: Caelifera
- Family: Acrididae
- Subfamily: Cyrtacanthacridinae
- Tribe: Cyrtacanthacridini
- Genus: Schistocerca
- Species: S. melanocera

Binomial name
- Schistocerca melanocera Stål, 1861

= Schistocerca melanocera =

Large painted locust

Species of grasshopper

The large painted locust (Schistocerca melanocera) is a species of bird grasshopper endemic to the Galapagos Islands of Ecuador, except Española Island. The species forms a large part of the diet of the Galápagos hawk and lava lizards. It can grow up to 8 cm long.
