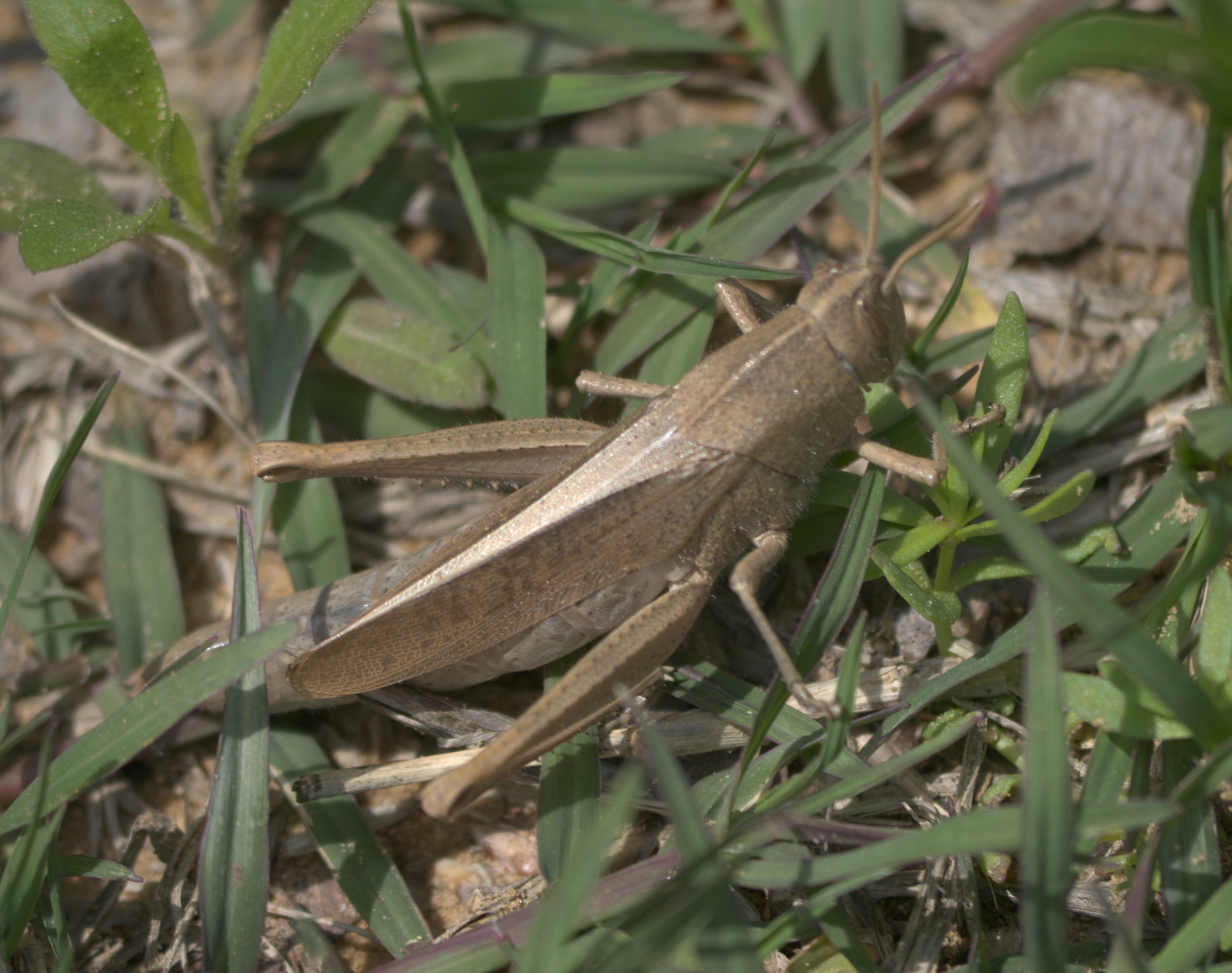

Scientific classification
- Kingdom: Animalia
- Phylum: Arthropoda
- Clade: Pancrustacea
- Class: Insecta
- Order: Orthoptera
- Suborder: Caelifera
- Family: Acrididae
- Tribe: Cyrtacanthacridini
- Genus: Schistocerca
- Species: S. damnifica

Binomial name
- Schistocerca damnifica (Saussure, 1861)

= Schistocerca damnifica =

Species of grasshopper

Schistocerca damnifica, known generally as the mischievous bird grasshopper or Carolina locust, is a species of bird grasshopper in the family Acrididae. It is found in North America.

== Features ==
Males reach generally reach sizes between 25 and 33 mm, females may grow to 37–47 mm. Wings and antennae of specimen located in the southern regions tend to be longer than their northern counterparts. These characteristics have led some authors to the designation of southern specimen as the subspecies Schistocerca damnifica calidior.
