= Sapheneutis metacentra =

Scientific classification
- Kingdom: Animalia
- Phylum: Arthropoda
- Class: Insecta
- Order: Lepidoptera
- Family: Psychidae
- Genus: Sapheneutis
- Species: S. metacentra

Binomial name
- Sapheneutis metacentra Meyrick, 1907

Synonyms
- Narycia metacentra Meyrick, 1907

Species of moth

Sapheneutis metacentra is a moth of the family Psychidae first described by Edward Meyrick in 1907. It is found in Sri Lanka.
