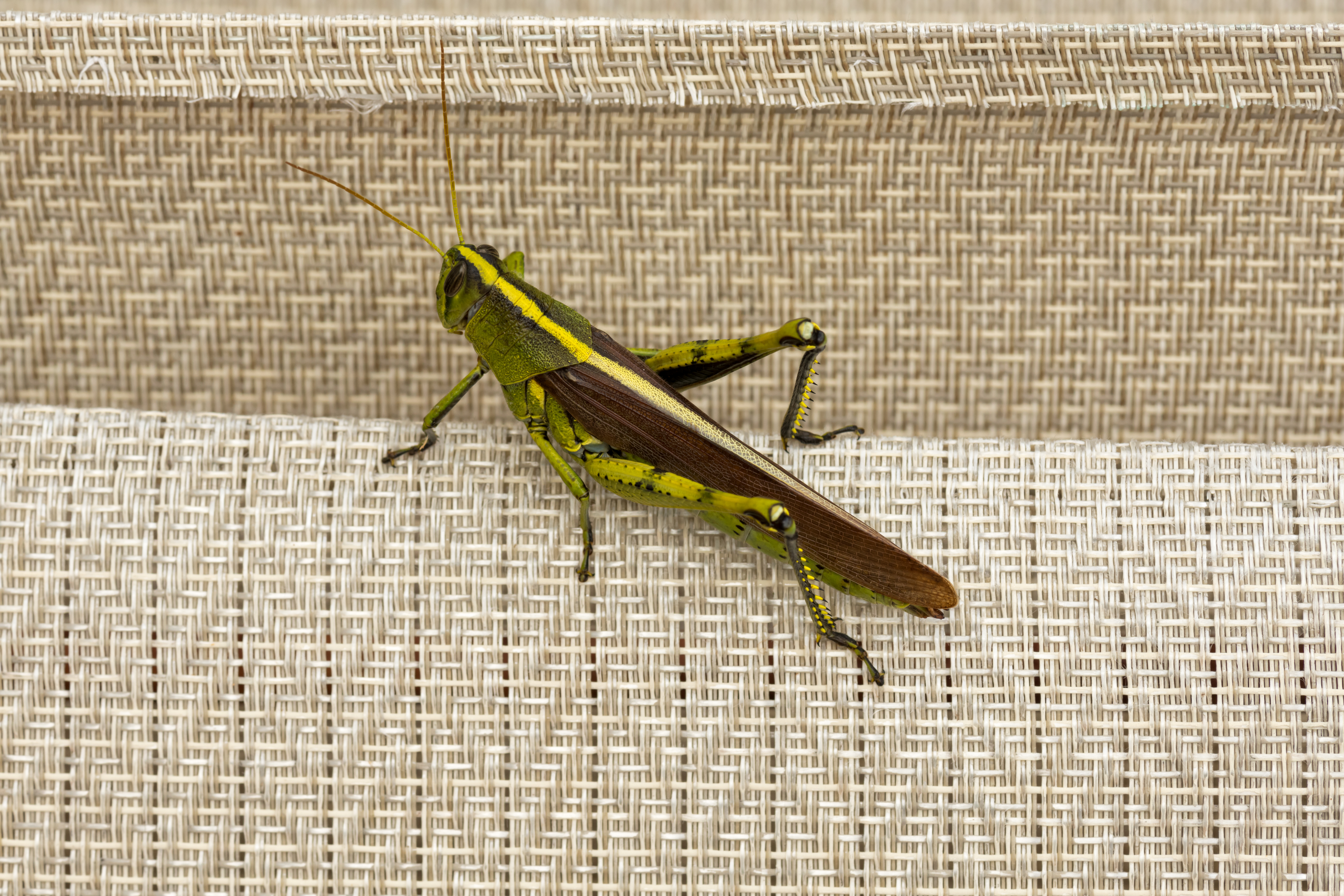
- Adult, Virginia Beach, Virginia

Scientific classification
- Kingdom: Animalia
- Phylum: Arthropoda
- Clade: Pancrustacea
- Class: Insecta
- Order: Orthoptera
- Suborder: Caelifera
- Family: Acrididae
- Subfamily: Cyrtacanthacridinae
- Tribe: Cyrtacanthacridini
- Genus: Schistocerca
- Species: S. obscura

Binomial name
- Schistocerca obscura (Fabricius, 1798)

= Schistocerca obscura =

Species of grasshopper

Schistocerca obscura, the obscure bird grasshopper, is a species of grasshopper in the family Acrididae. The species occurs in the United States, from Maryland south to Florida and west to Arizona.

== Gallery ==
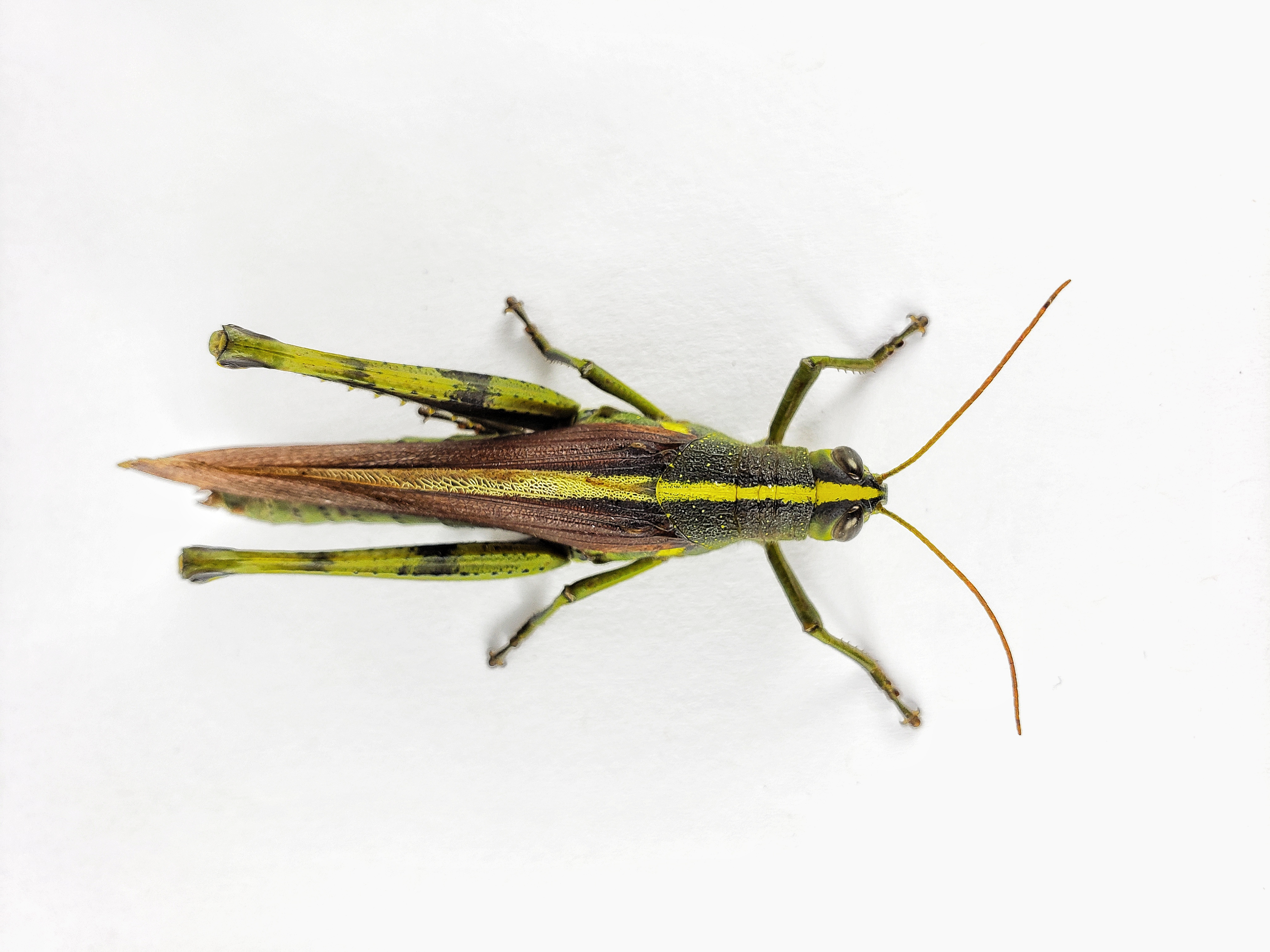
Obscure Bird Grasshopper - Schistocerca obscura - dorsal view

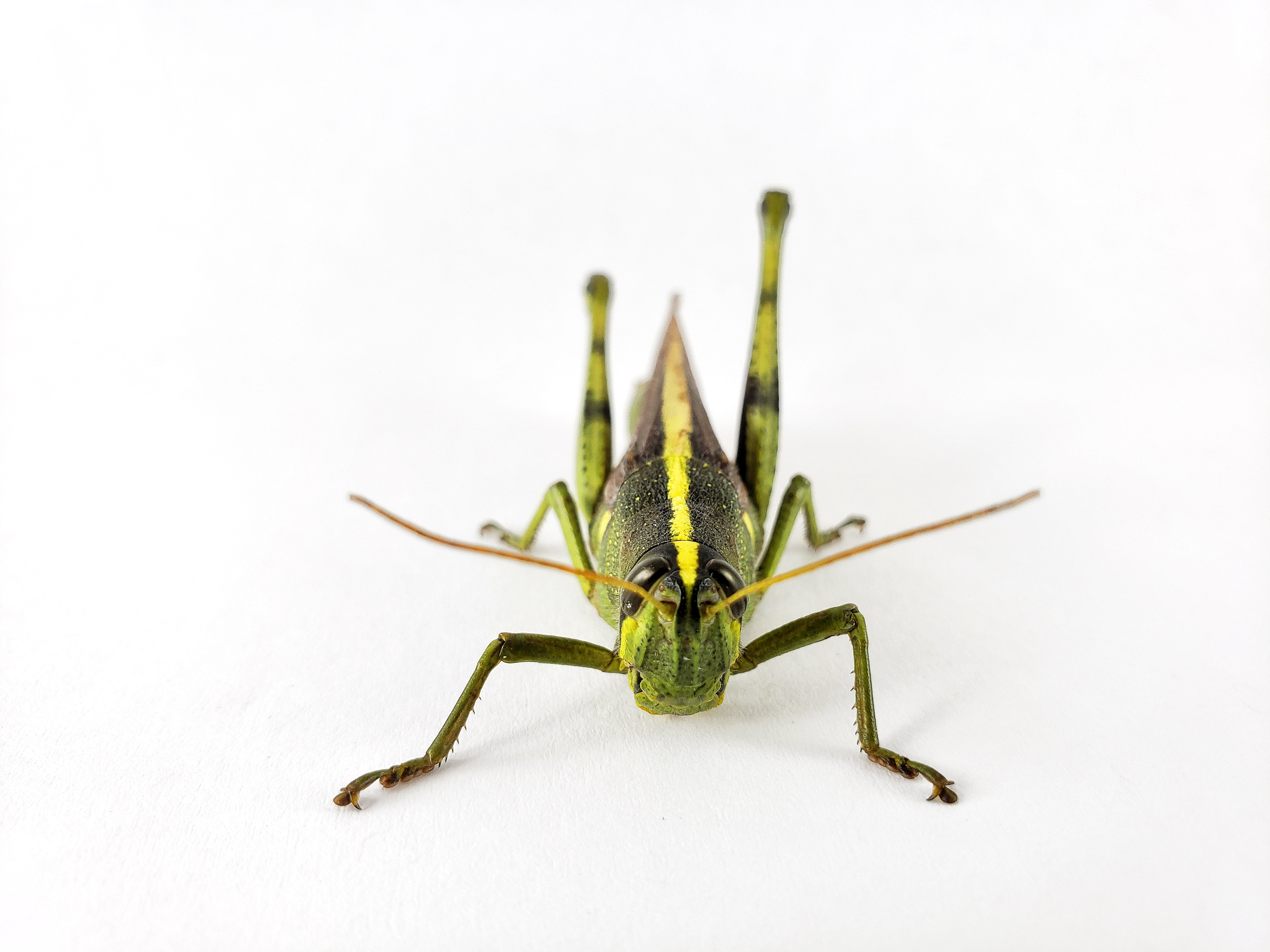
front view

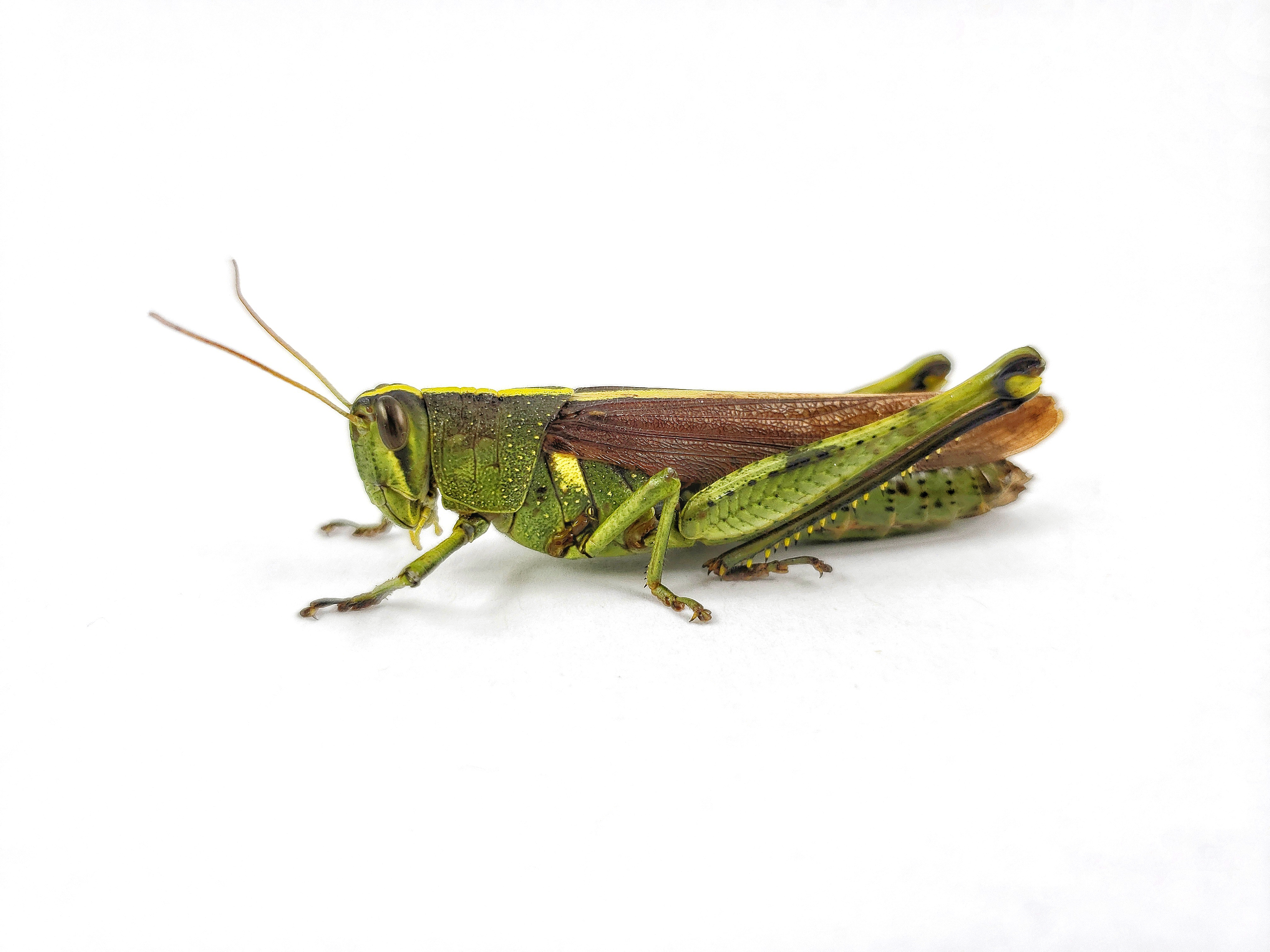
side view
