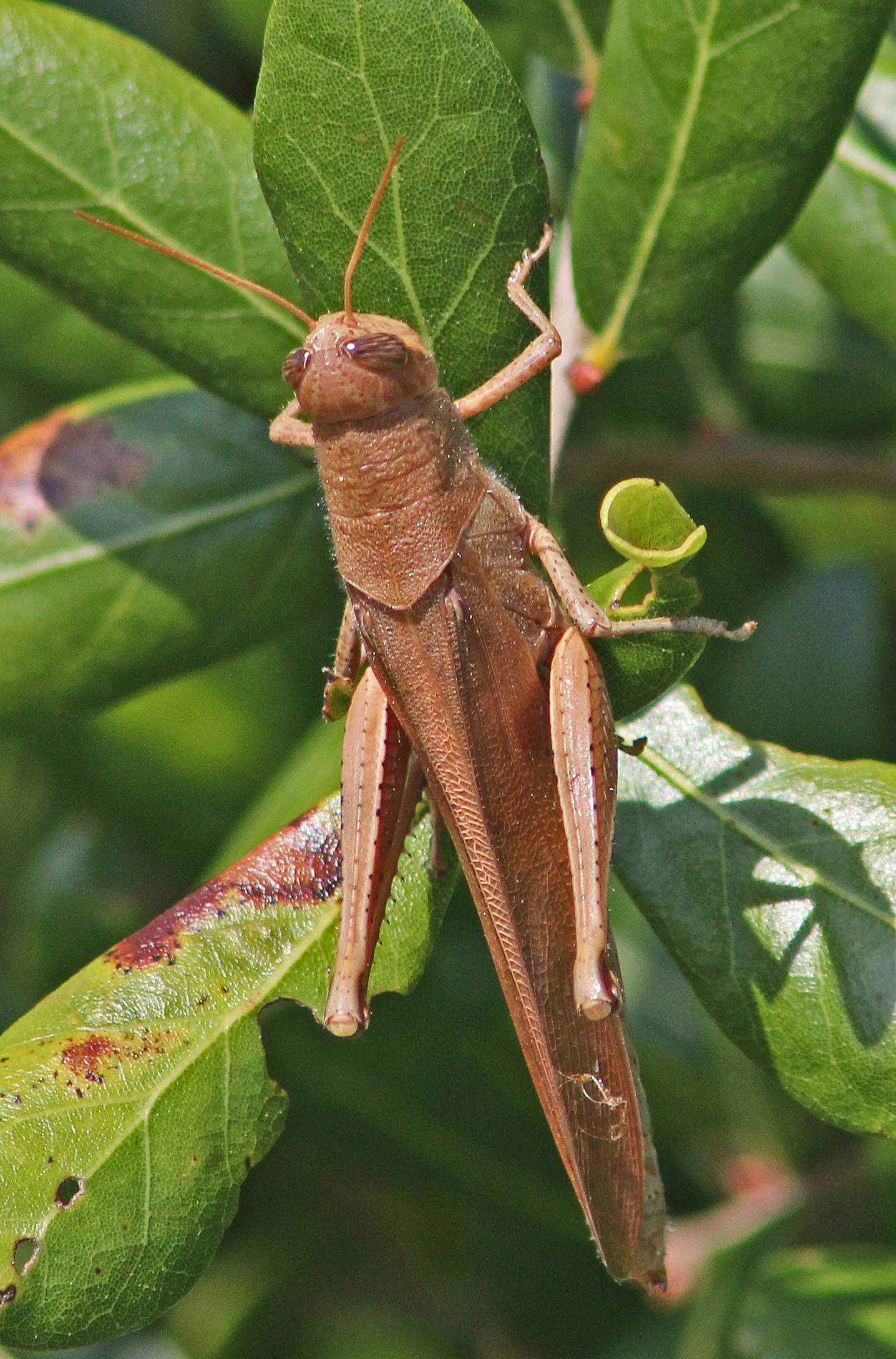

Scientific classification
- Kingdom: Animalia
- Phylum: Arthropoda
- Clade: Pancrustacea
- Class: Insecta
- Order: Orthoptera
- Suborder: Caelifera
- Family: Acrididae
- Subfamily: Cyrtacanthacridinae
- Tribe: Cyrtacanthacridini
- Genus: Schistocerca
- Species: S. rubiginosa

Binomial name
- Schistocerca rubiginosa (Harris, 1863)

= Schistocerca rubiginosa =

Species of grasshopper

Schistocerca rubiginosa, the rusty bird grasshopper, is a species of bird grasshopper in the family Acrididae. It is found in North America and South America.
