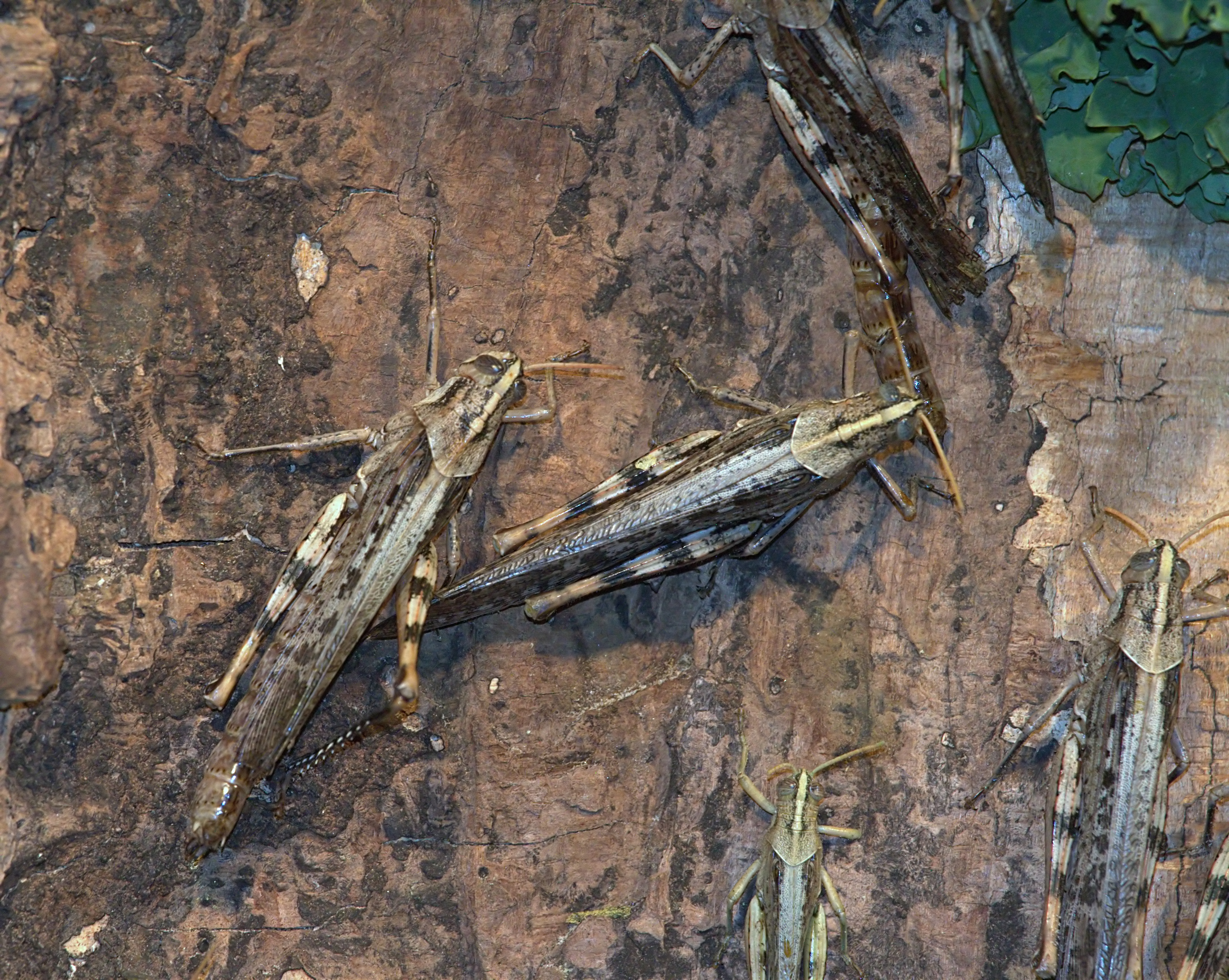

Conservation status
- Secure (NatureServe)

Scientific classification
- Kingdom: Animalia
- Phylum: Arthropoda
- Clade: Pancrustacea
- Class: Insecta
- Order: Orthoptera
- Suborder: Caelifera
- Family: Acrididae
- Subfamily: Cyrtacanthacridinae
- Tribe: Cyrtacanthacridini
- Genus: Schistocerca
- Species: S. nitens

Binomial name
- Schistocerca nitens Thunberg, 1815

Synonyms
- Synonymy: Gryllus columbinus Thunberg 1824; Gryllus nitens Thunberg 1815; Schistocerca australis; Schistocerca impleta (Walker); Schistocerca vaga

= Schistocerca nitens =

Species of grasshopper

Schistocerca nitens is a species of grasshopper known by several names, including vagrant grasshopper and gray bird grasshopper. It is a close relative of the desert locust, which is in the same genus. This grasshopper is native to southern North America including Mexico and the south-western United States from California to Texas. Vagrants are occasionally found in Colorado, Utah, and Oklahoma, where the winters are too cold for them to survive, otherwise. It is also present in parts of Central and South America. It lives in many habitats including desert, woodland, and lower elevation mountainous areas. This species is known as a pest on ornamental plants and many types of crop plants.

== Description ==
Adult females are 60–70 millimetres (2.4–2.8 in) while the smaller males are 40–50 millimetres (1.6–2.0 in). They are mottled in coloration, with colors including grays, browns, and yellows. A stripe runs from their head to their thorax.

Juveniles, called nymphs, are usually a lighter brown or green, with a dark stripe extending down below the eye.

== Life cycle ==
The grasshopper becomes sexually mature at 3 to 4 months of age. Any stage of its life cycle can be seen at any time of the year, but the adult is less active during the winter and fall. Mating usually occurs on warm nights in summer, and often around bright lights.

Adult females lay their eggs in the late summer or early fall. They deposit their eggs in the soil by inserting their ovipositor at a depth of 1-2 inches. Eggs are encapsulated in pods that can contain as few as 20 or more than 100 eggs.

== Hawaiian population ==
It is a troublesome invasive species in Hawaii. A particularly destructive swarming event occurred on the Hawaiian island of Nīhoa in 2004, wiping out some 90% of the vegetation on the island. Despite reaching high population densities, this particular species does not swarm as locusts, which is a distinct behavior accompanied by a gregarious phase change. Rather, the grasshoppers reached swarm proportions despite in solitary form, as a result of being an invasive species in an extremely favorable environment. It was probably introduced to Hawaii several decades ago and then spread through the archipelago by flying; it has the ability to fly at least 300 miles across ocean.
