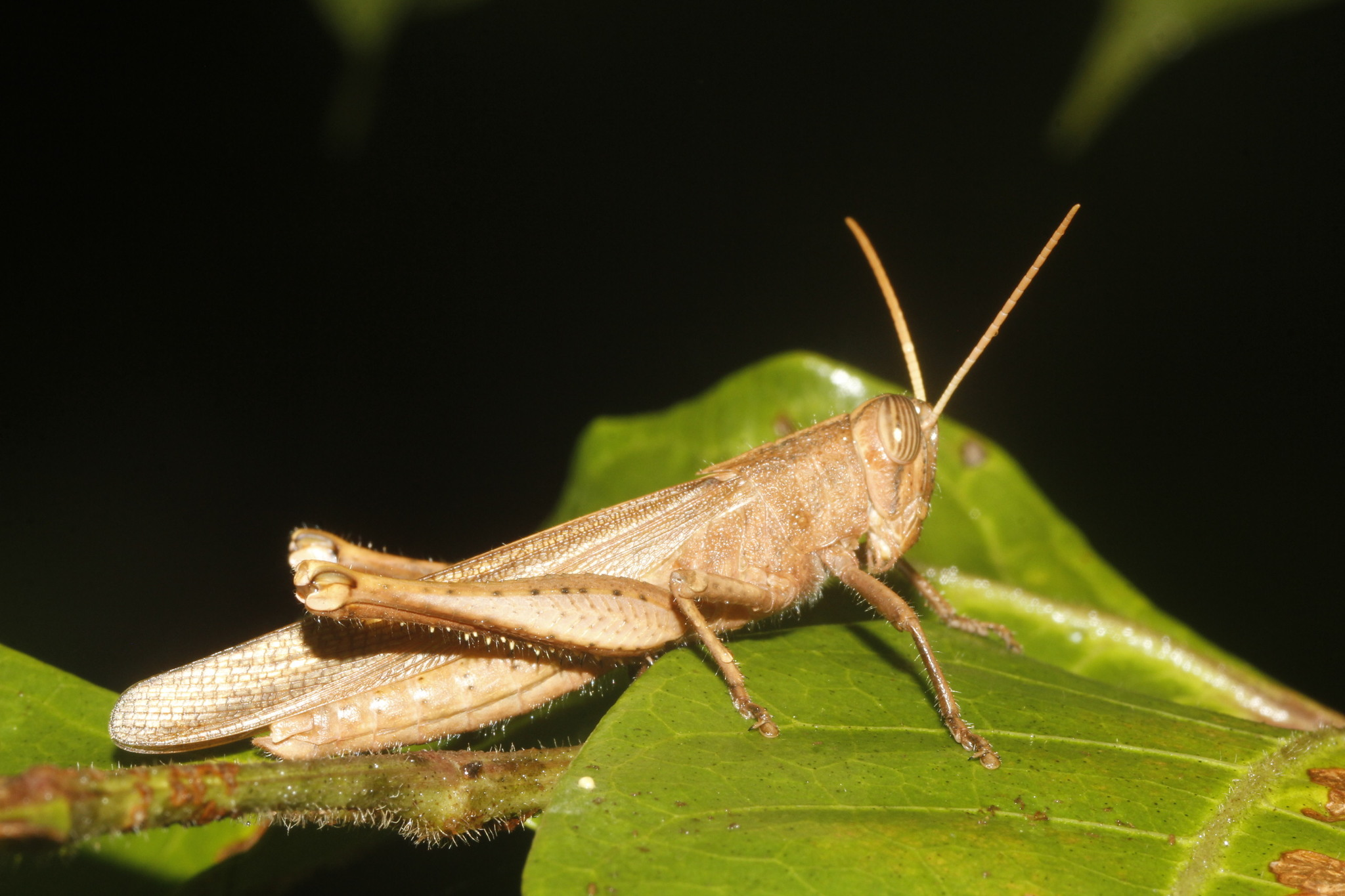
- Schistocerca cohni, Mexico

Scientific classification
- Kingdom: Animalia
- Phylum: Arthropoda
- Clade: Pancrustacea
- Class: Insecta
- Order: Orthoptera
- Suborder: Caelifera
- Family: Acrididae
- Subfamily: Cyrtacanthacridinae
- Tribe: Cyrtacanthacridini
- Genus: Schistocerca
- Species: S. cohni

Binomial name
- Schistocerca cohni Song, 2006

= Schistocerca cohni =

Species of grasshopper

Schistocerca cohni is a species of bird grasshopper in the family Acrididae. It is found in Mexico.
