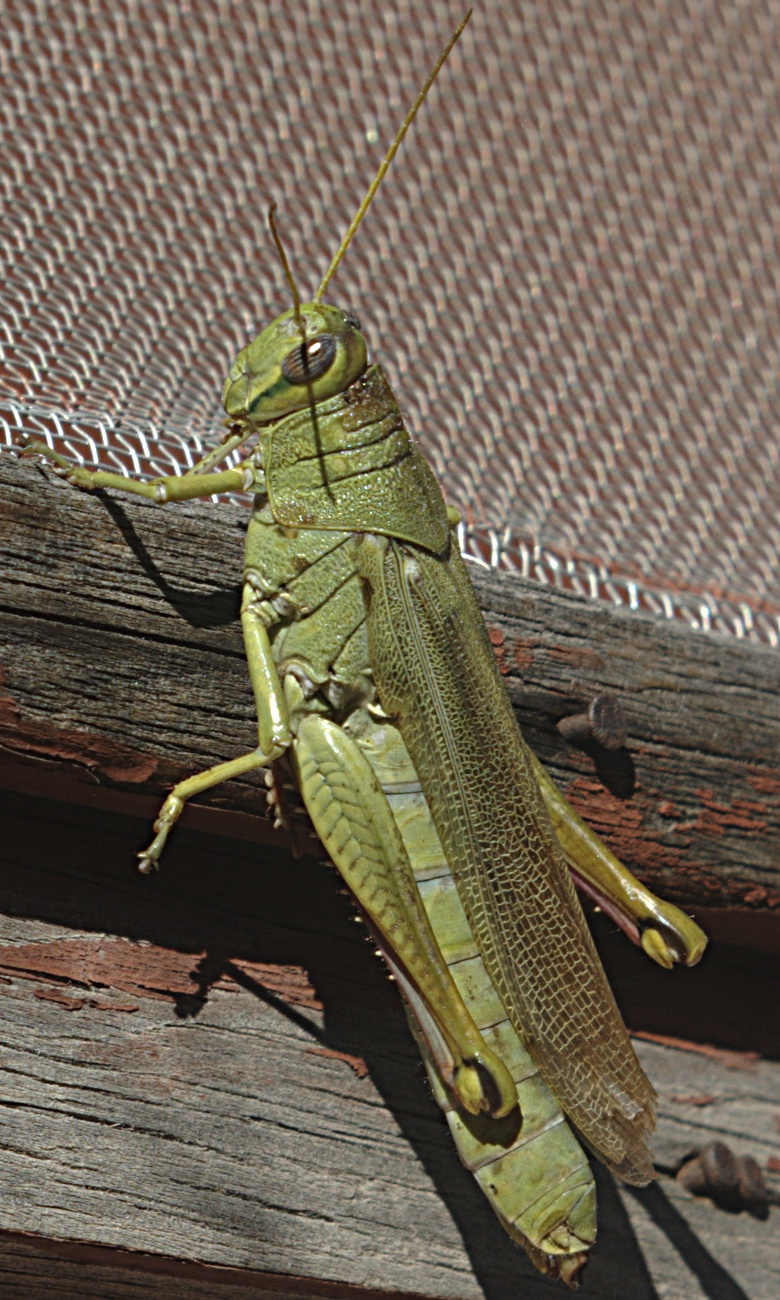

Scientific classification
- Kingdom: Animalia
- Phylum: Arthropoda
- Clade: Pancrustacea
- Class: Insecta
- Order: Orthoptera
- Suborder: Caelifera
- Family: Acrididae
- Tribe: Cyrtacanthacridini
- Genus: Schistocerca
- Species: S. shoshone

Binomial name
- Schistocerca shoshone (Thomas, 1873)

= Schistocerca shoshone =

Schistocerca shoshone Temporal range: Holocene - Recent

Species of grasshopper

Schistocerca shoshone, known generally as the green bird grasshopper or green valley grasshopper, is a species of bird grasshopper in the family Acrididae. It is found in North America.
