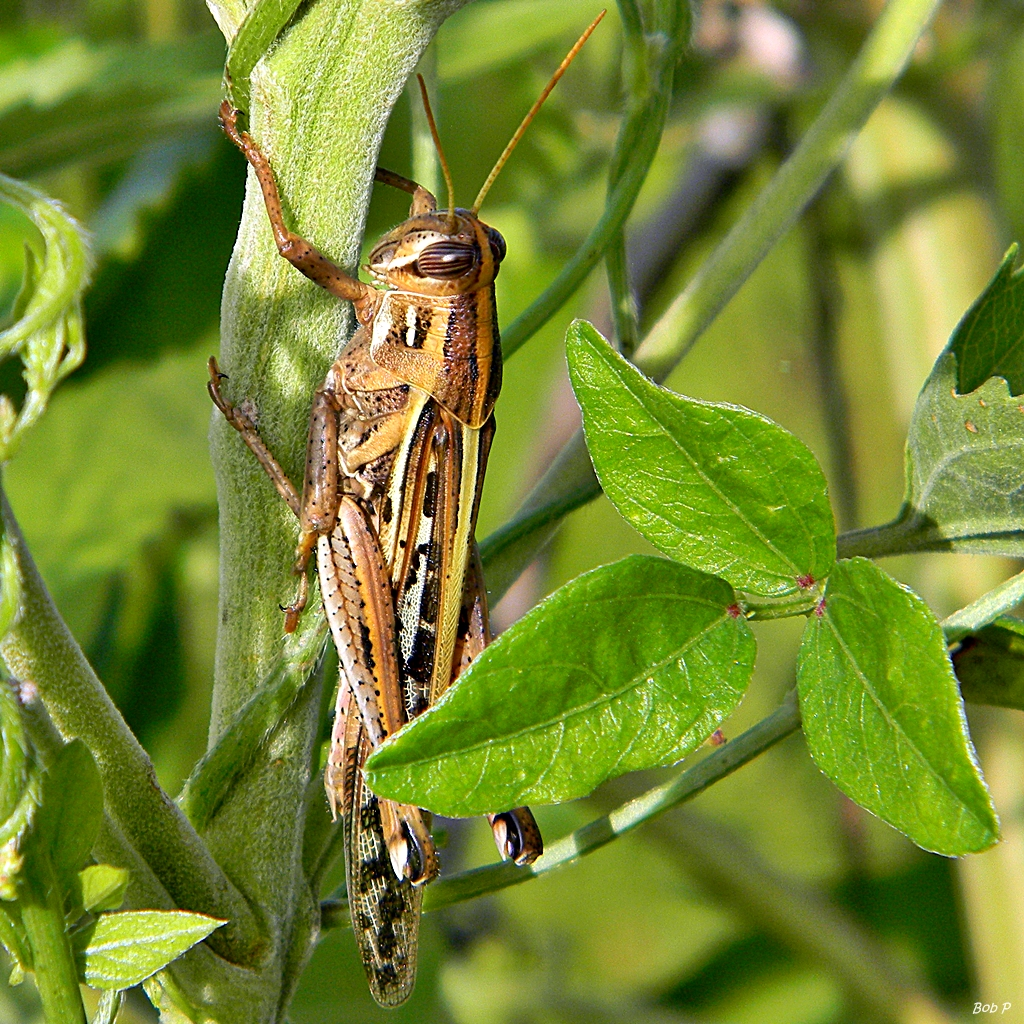
- Schistocerca cf. americana

Scientific classification
- Kingdom: Animalia
- Phylum: Arthropoda
- Clade: Pancrustacea
- Class: Insecta
- Order: Orthoptera
- Suborder: Caelifera
- Family: Acrididae
- Subfamily: Cyrtacanthacridinae
- Tribe: Cyrtacanthacridini
- Genus: Schistocerca; Stål, 1873

Species
- see text

= Schistocerca =

Genus of grasshoppers

Schistocerca is a genus of grasshoppers, commonly called bird grasshoppers, many of which swarm as locusts. The best known species is probably the desert locust (S. gregaria), and trans-Atlantic flight may explain the biogeography of some locust species.

== Species ==
The Orthoptera Species File lists:

- Schistocerca albolineata (Thomas, 1875) – white-lined bird grasshopper
- Schistocerca alutacea (Harris, 1841) – leather-colored bird grasshopper
- Schistocerca americana (Drury, 1773) – American bird grasshopper – type species
- Schistocerca beckeri (Dirsh, 1974)
- Schistocerca bivittata (Stål, 1873)
- Schistocerca braziliensis (Dirsh, 1974)
- Schistocerca brevis (Rehn, 1913)
- Schistocerca camerata (Scudder, 1899)
- Schistocerca cancellata (Serville, 1838) – South American locust
- Schistocerca carneipes (Serville, 1838)
- Schistocerca caribbeana (Dirsh, 1974)
- Schistocerca centralis (Dirsh, 1974)
- Schistocerca ceratiola (Hubbell & Walker, 1928) – rosemary grasshopper
- Schistocerca cohni (Song, 2006)
- Schistocerca damnifica (Saussure, 1861) – mischievous bird grasshopper
- Schistocerca diversipes (Hebard, 1923)
- Schistocerca flavofasciata (De Geer, 1773)
- Schistocerca gorgona (Dirsh, 1974)
- Schistocerca gregaria (Forskål, 1775) – desert locust
- Schistocerca impleta (Walker, 1870)
- Schistocerca interrita (Scudder, 1899)
- Schistocerca lineata (Scudder, 1899) – spotted bird grasshopper
- Schistocerca literosa (Walker, 1870) – small painted locust
- Schistocerca magnifica (Bruner, 1913)
- Schistocerca matogrosso (Dirsh, 1974)
- Schistocerca melanocera (Stål, 1861) – large painted locust
- Schistocerca nitens (Thunberg, 1815) – grey bird grasshopper
- Schistocerca obscura (Fabricius, 1798) – obscure bird grasshopper
- Schistocerca orinoco (Dirsh, 1974)
- Schistocerca pallens (Thunberg, 1815)
- Schistocerca philippina (Navás, 1904)
- Schistocerca piceifrons (Walker, 1870) – Central American locust
- Schistocerca quisqueya (Rehn & Hebard, 1938)
- Schistocerca rubiginosa (Harris, 1862) – rusty bird grasshopper
- Schistocerca serialis (Thunberg, 1815)
- Schistocerca shoshone (Thomas, 1873) – green bird grasshopper
- Schistocerca socorro (Dirsh, 1974)
