= Sapheneutis pulchella =

Scientific classification
- Kingdom: Animalia
- Phylum: Arthropoda
- Class: Insecta
- Order: Lepidoptera
- Family: Psychidae
- Genus: Sapheneutis
- Species: S. pulchella

Binomial name
- Sapheneutis pulchella Sobczyk & Schütte, 2010

Species of moth

Sapheneutis pulchella is a species of bagworm moth native to eastern Madagascar.

== Biology ==
The male has a wingspan of 21 mm, and the length of the forewings is 10 mm. The female has a wingspan between 21 and 31 mm.

Forewings are rounded with nine veins and white with black dots, and hindwings are uniformly white with six veins. The antenna has 52 segments that are densely scaled. The eyes are black and large, and the eye height is approx. 3.5 times the distance of the eyes.

The types had been found on trees with lichens and were found around Andasibe and Moramanga.

== See also ==
- List of moths of Madagascar
