= Sapheneutis camerata =

Scientific classification
- Kingdom: Animalia
- Phylum: Arthropoda
- Class: Insecta
- Order: Lepidoptera
- Family: Psychidae
- Genus: Sapheneutis
- Species: S. camerata

Binomial name
- Sapheneutis camerata Meyrick, 1907

Species of moth

Sapheneutis camerata is a bagworm species in the genus Sapheneutis. It is found in Sri Lanka.

This species has a wingspan of 12-15mm for the males and 21-23mm for the females. The forewings are pale-whitish ochreous, markings rather dark fuscous edged with black, a fascia near base and before middle.
