= Camerata =

Camerata, a dormitory or a comrade in Italian or an adjective meaning chambered in Latin, may refer to:

== Music ==
- Camerata (music), a small chamber orchestra or choir
- Camerata – Queensland's Chamber Orchestra, an orchestra in Queensland, Australia
- Camerata Bariloche, an Argentine chamber music ensemble founded in 1977
- Florentine Camerata, an Italian musical association of the late sixteenth century

== Places ==
- Camerata Cornello, a municipality in the Province of Bergamo in the Italian region of Lombardy
- Camerata Nuova, a municipality in the Province of Rome in the Italian region Lazio
- Camerata Picena, a municipality in the Province of Ancona in the Italian region Marche

== Other uses ==
- Camerata (crinoid), an extinct subclass of crinoids from the Paleozoic
- Camerata (flatworm), a flatworm genus in the family Uteriporidae
- Giuseppe Camerata (1718–1803), Italian painter and engraver

== See also ==
- Charles Félix Jean-Baptiste Camerata-Passionei di Mazzoleni (1826–1853), French-Italian aristocrat
