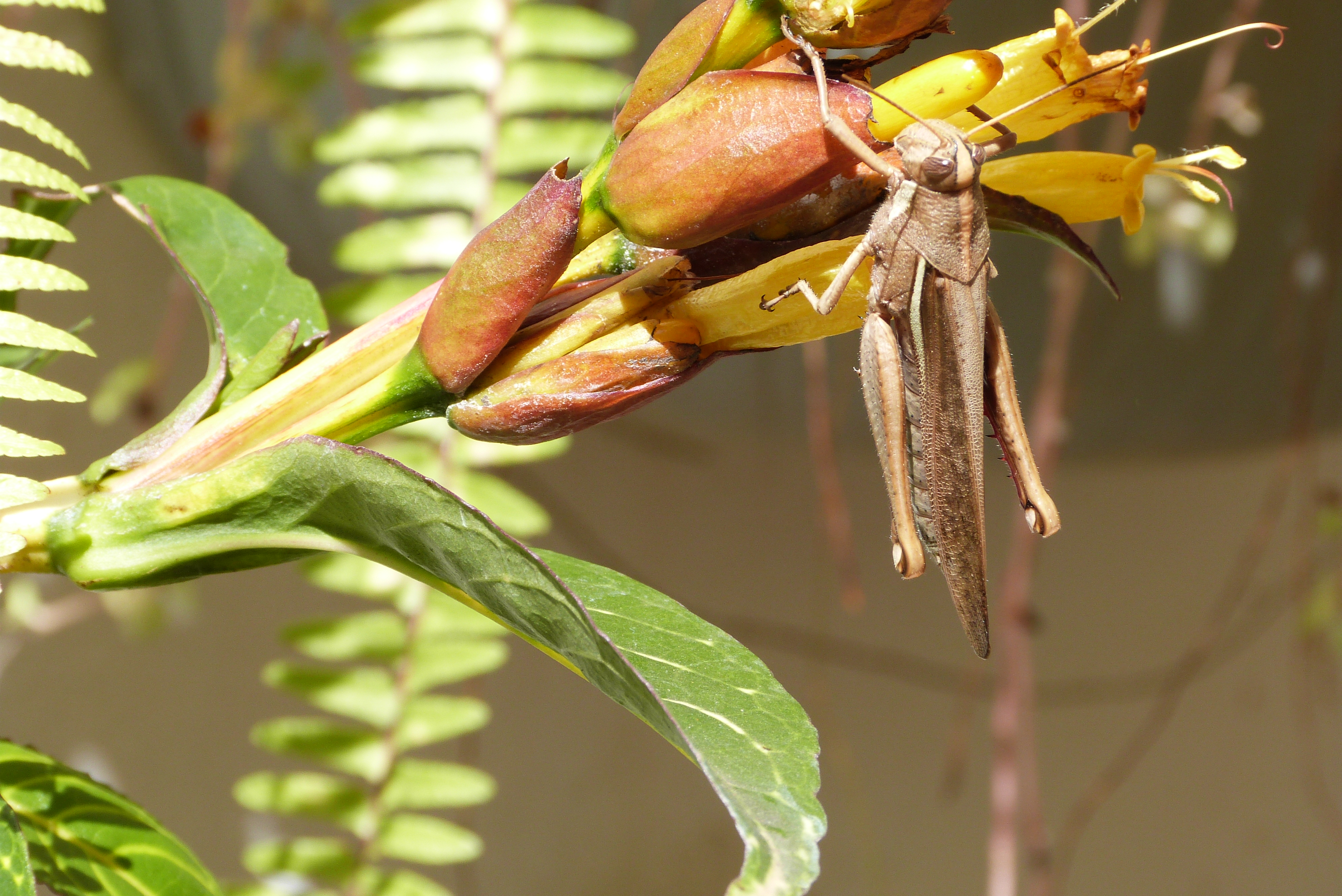
- Schistocerca cancellata

Scientific classification
- Kingdom: Animalia
- Phylum: Arthropoda
- Clade: Pancrustacea
- Class: Insecta
- Order: Orthoptera
- Suborder: Caelifera
- Family: Acrididae
- Subfamily: Cyrtacanthacridinae
- Tribe: Cyrtacanthacridini
- Genus: Schistocerca
- Species: S. cancellata

Binomial name
- Schistocerca cancellata (Serville, 1838)

Synonyms
- Acridium emortuale (Saussure, 1861); Acridium paranense (Burmeister, 1861)

= Schistocerca cancellata =

Species of grasshopper

Schistocerca cancellata is a species of locust in the subfamily Cyrtacanthacridinae. It is the major swarming species in subtropical South America. This species shows typical locust phase polymorphism. Solitarious nymphs are green, but gregarious ones are yellow with a black pattern. There are morphological differences between solitarious and gregarious adults. For many years the two phases were believed to be different species and the gregarious form was mistakenly identified as S. paranensis. The solitary phase is found in South America between 18°S and 35°S. Plagues originate in a desert and semi-desert zona permanente in northwest Argentina, southeast Bolivia and western Paraguay, when good rains allow successful breeding, followed by gregarisation. Swarms of gregarious adults may then migrate into crop growing regions.

== Economic importance ==
Schistocerca cancellata is polyphagous, damaging a wide range of crops and forage plants. It is probably the most economically damaging of all the locust species. It was estimated that in 1933, locusts destroyed 2 million tons of cereals and other annual crops. High levels of damage have also been recorded in Uruguay and Brazil.
