= Schistocerca camerata =

Scientific classification
- Kingdom: Animalia
- Phylum: Arthropoda
- Clade: Pancrustacea
- Class: Insecta
- Order: Orthoptera
- Suborder: Caelifera
- Family: Acrididae
- Subfamily: Cyrtacanthacridinae
- Tribe: Cyrtacanthacridini
- Genus: Schistocerca
- Species: S. camerata

Binomial name
- Schistocerca camerata Scudder, 1899

Species of grasshopper

Schistocerca camerata is a grasshopper species in the genus Schistocerca.
