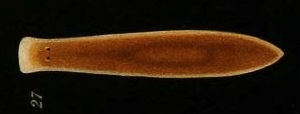
- Uteriporus vulgaris

Scientific classification
- Kingdom: Animalia
- Phylum: Platyhelminthes
- Order: Tricladida
- Superfamily: Bdellouroidea
- Family: Uteriporidae; Wilhelmi, 1909

Subfamilies
- Ectoplaninae; Uteriporinae

= Uteriporidae =

Family of flatworms

Uteriporidae is a family of Maricola triclads.
