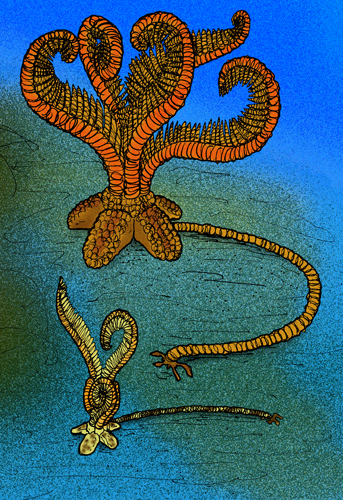
- Calceolispongia hindei

Scientific classification
- Kingdom: Animalia
- Phylum: Echinodermata
- Class: Crinoidea
- Order: †Cladida
- Family: †Calceolispongiidae
- Genus: †Calceolispongia Etheridge, 1914

Species
- C. robusta; C. hindei; C. spectabilis; C. rubra; C. multiformis; C. mammeata; C. cornuta; C. elegans; C. bifurca; C. elegantula; C. abundans; C. digitata; C. spinosa; C. rotundata

= Calceolispongia =

Calceolispongia Temporal range: Permian

Extinct genus of crinoids

Calceolispongia (literally "shoe sponge") is a diverse genus of cladid crinoids that lived along the shores of eastern Pangaea that correspond to Timor and Western Australia, today.

When the first fossils were discovered, they were mistakenly thought to be sponges, hence the generic name. Later, similarly shaped fossils were found, and (correctly) identified as those of a crinoid, and named "Dinocrinus." ("Terrible Lily") It was soon realized that Dinocrinus and Calceolispongia were the same, and Dinocrinus is now regarded as a junior synonym.
