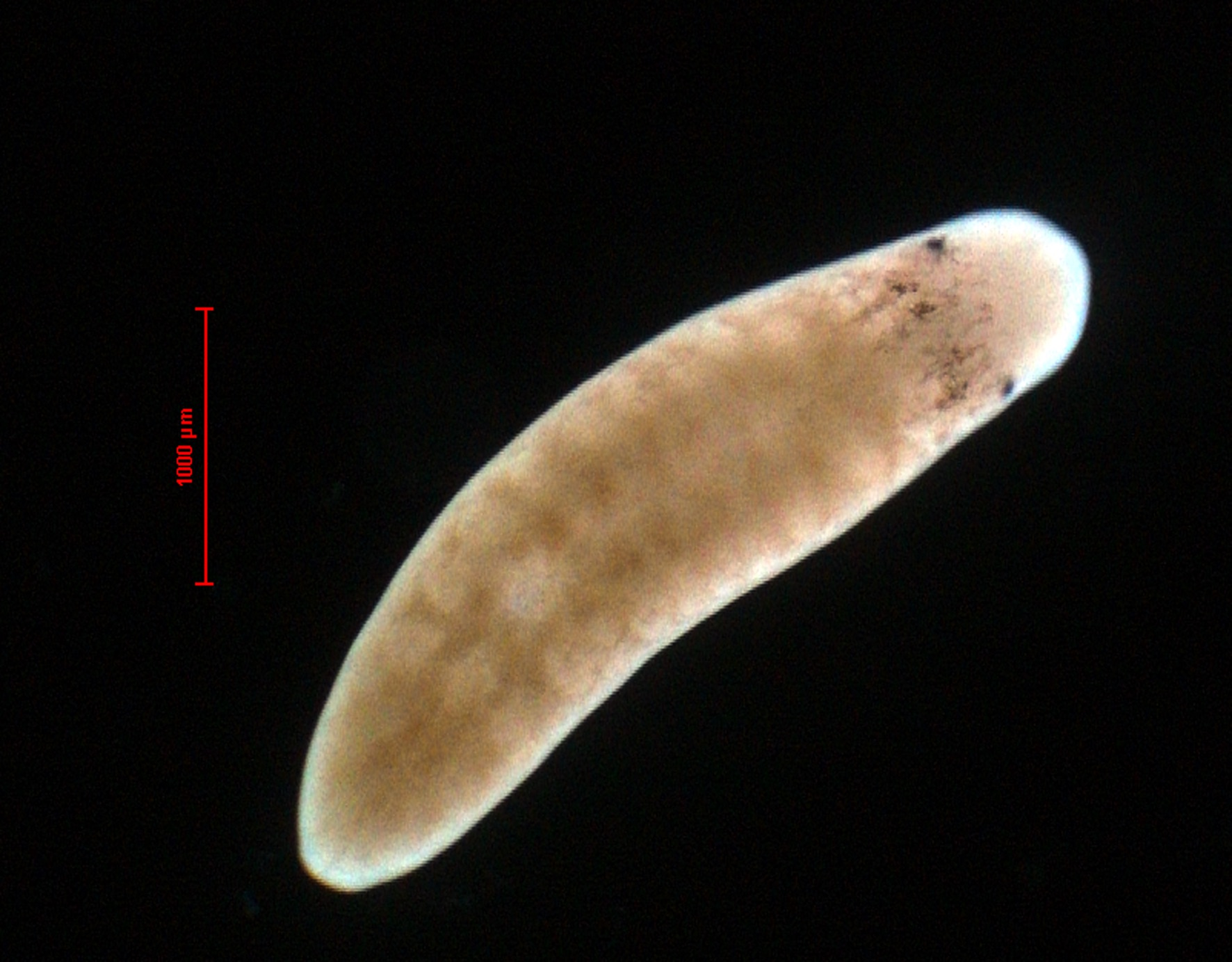

Scientific classification
- Kingdom: Animalia
- Phylum: Platyhelminthes
- Order: Tricladida
- Family: Uteriporidae
- Genus: Camerata; Vila-Farre, Sluys, D'Aniello, Cebria, Ferrer & Romero, 2009
- Species: C. robusta

Binomial name
- Camerata robusta Vila-Farre, Sluys, D'Aniello, Cebria, Ferrer & Romero, 2009

= Camerata robusta =

Species of flatworm

Camerata robusta is a species of triclad flatworm found in the shores of Italy. It is the only known species in the genus Camerata. Camerata refers to the chambers present in this genus' penis. The species name robusta refers to the strong muscles present in the copulatory apparatus.
