= Plague =

Plague or The Plague may refer to:

== Agriculture, fauna, and medicine ==
- Plague, one of the three forms of a disease caused by infectious bacteria Yersinia pestis:
  - Bubonic plague
  - Pneumonic plague
  - Septicemic plague
- An epidemic or pandemic of infectious disease (medical or agricultural)
- Acute overpopulation of pests afflicting the environment or agriculture, including:
  - Swarms of pest insects such as locusts
  - Rodent plagues
- Plague, collective noun for common grackles

=== Historical plagues ===
- List of epidemics
- Antonine Plague, an ancient pandemic in 165–189 CE brought to the Roman Empire by troops returning from campaigns in the Near East
- Black Death, the Eurasian pandemic beginning in the 14th century, also known as "The Plague"
- Great Northern War plague outbreak, a European outbreak in the early 18th century
- Great Plague of London, a massive outbreak in England that killed an estimated 20% of London's population in 1665–1666
- Plague of Athens, a devastating epidemic which hit Athens in ancient Greece in 430 BCE
- Plague of Justinian, a pandemic in 541–542 CE in the Byzantine Empire
- Plague Riot, a riot in Moscow in 1771 caused by an outbreak of bubonic plague

=== Modern plagues ===
- Third plague pandemic or Third Plague, a major plague pandemic that began in China in 1855 until 1960
  - Manchurian plague (1910–11): Part of the third plague pandemic
- HIV/AIDS, originally referred to as the "gay plague" when it was discovered in the 1980s (see History of HIV/AIDS)
- Vole plague in Castile and León (Spain), in 2007.

== Art, media, and entertainment ==
=== Art ===
- Plague (painting), by Arnold Böcklin

=== Fictional entities ===
- Plague, Lisbeth Salander's hacker friend and colleague in the Hacker Republic, e.g., see The Girl who Kicked the Hornet's Nest#Trial
- The Plague (G.I. Joe), a Cobra special forces team in the comic book G.I. Joe: America's Elite
- The Plague, a duo of demonic assassins in the movie Hobo with a Shotgun

=== Films ===
- Plague (1979 film), a science-fiction film
- The Plague (1992 film), a drama film
- The Plague (2006 film), a horror film
- Plague (2014 film), an Australian horror film
- The Plague (2025 film), a psychological drama thriller film

=== Games ===
- Corrupted Blood incident, a virtual plague that occurred in the video game World of Warcraft
- Plague Inc., a strategy game for smartphones and tablets by Ndemic Creations
- Plague!, a card game about the Black Plague in England
- Plague of Shadows (Plague Knight), a character and DLC gamemode for Shovel Knight
- The Plague, a playable killer character of Babylonian origin from the asymmetrical-survival horror Dead by Daylight
- "A Plague Tale: Innocence" and "A Plague Tale: Requiem", survival horror games set in 14th century France

=== Literature ===
- Plague, a 2000 young adult novel by Malcolm Rose
- Plague, a 1977 thriller novel by Graham Masterton
- Plague 99, a novel by Jean Ure
- The Plague (novel), a novel by Albert Camus
- "The Plague" (Dragon Prince), an epidemic which affects both humans and dragons in Melanie Rawn's novel
- The Plague (magazine), New York University's comedy magazine

=== Music ===
==== Artists ====
- The Plague (American band), a hardcore punk band from Cleveland
- The Plague (British band), a punk rock band
- The Plague (New Zealand band), a theatrical punk/art rock band

==== Albums ====
- Plague (Klinik album)
- Plagues (album), by The Devil Wears Prada
- The Plague, by Demon
- The Plague (Brotha Lynch Hung album)

==== EPs ====
- The Plague (Nuclear Assault EP)
- The Plague (I Hate Sally EP)

==== Songs ====
- "Plague" (song), by Crystal Castles from the 2012 album III
- "The Plague", by Demon from the 1983 album by the same name
- "The Plague," an unreleased song by The Mountain Goats that appears on the 2020 live album The Jordan Lake Sessions
- "THE PLAGUE," a song by Melanie Martinez

=== Musicals ===
- Plague! The Musical, by David Massingham and Matthew Townend

=== Television ===
- "Plague" (The Dead Zone), a 2003 episode
- "Plague" (Deadwood), a 2004 episode
- "The Plague" (Diagnosis: Murder), a 1994 episode
- "The Plague" (Doctor Who), second episode of the 1966 serial The Ark
- "Plague" (Domina), a 2021 episode
- "The Plague" (Father Ted), a 1996 episode
- The Plague, English title of 2018 Spanish TV series La peste

== Religion ==
- Plagues of Egypt, the 10 calamities that God inflicted on Egypt in the book of Exodus
- The seven plagues poured out from seven bowls in Revelation 15:5-16:21

== Technology ==
- Capacitor plague, a condition afflicting computer motherboards in which capacitors fail

== See also ==
- Plaque (disambiguation)
