= Plack =

Plack may refer to:

- Plack (coin), an ancient Scottish coin
- Plack (software), a set of tools for running Perl-based Web applications and frameworks
- Plack (horse)

== People with the surname ==
- Adam Plack, Australian musician, composer and producer

== See also ==
- Plackart, medieval armor
- Plac (disambiguation)
- Placard, notice/poster/sign
- Plaque (disambiguation)
