= Locust =

Grasshopper that has a swarming phase

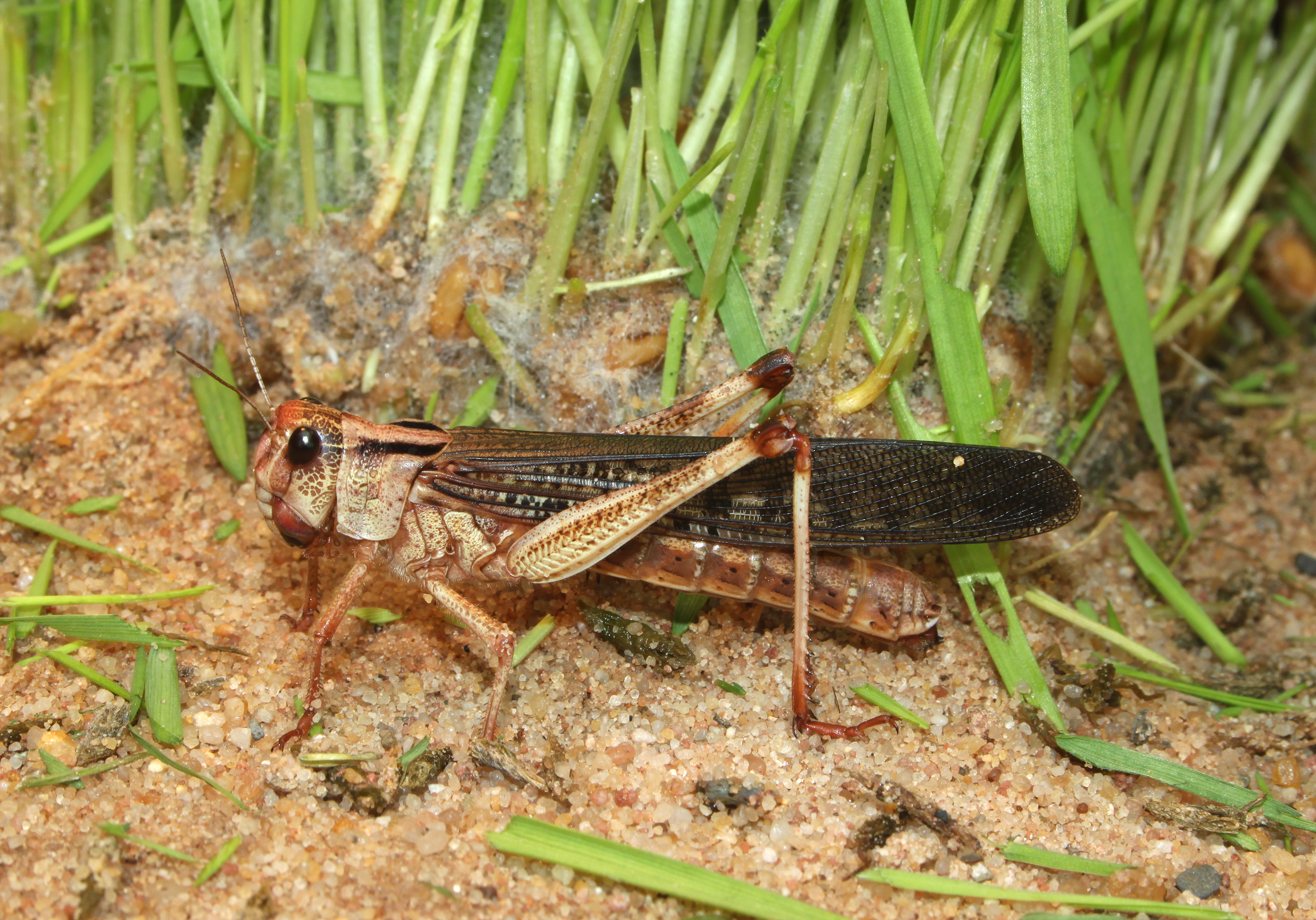
Locusts, such as this migratory locust (Locusta migratoria), are grasshoppers in a migratory phase of their life.

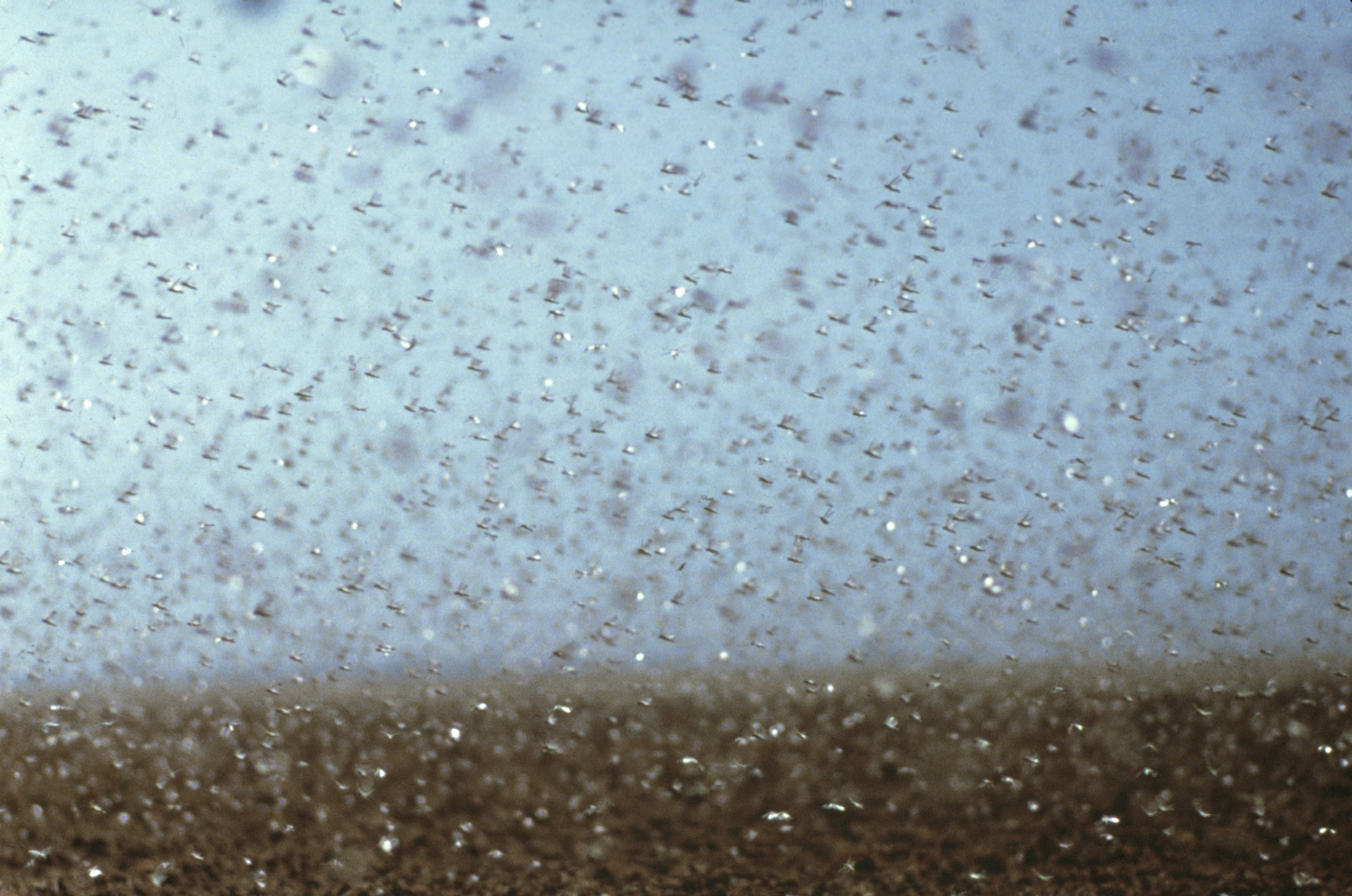
Millions of swarming Australian plague locusts on the move

Locusts (derived from the Latin locusta, locust or lobster) are various species of short-horned grasshoppers in the family Acrididae that have a swarming phase. These insects are usually solitary, but under certain circumstances they become more abundant and change their behaviour and habits, becoming gregarious. No taxonomic distinction is made between locust and grasshopper species; the basis for the definition is whether a species forms swarms under intermittently suitable conditions. Swarming has evolved independently in multiple lineages, comprising at least 18 genera in 5 different subfamilies.

Normally, these grasshoppers are innocuous, their numbers are low, and they do not pose a major economic threat to agriculture. However, under suitable conditions of drought followed by rapid vegetation growth, serotonin in their brains triggers dramatic changes: they start to breed abundantly, becoming gregarious and nomadic (loosely described as migratory) when their populations become dense enough. They form bands of wingless nymphs that later become swarms of winged adults. Both the bands and the swarms move around, rapidly strip fields, and damage crops. The adults are powerful fliers; they can travel great distances, consuming most of the green vegetation wherever the swarm settles.

Locusts have formed plagues since prehistory. The ancient Egyptians carved them on their tombs and the insects are mentioned in the Iliad, the Mahabharata, the Bible and the Quran. Swarms have devastated crops and have caused famines and human migrations. More recently, changes in agricultural practices and better surveillance of locust breeding grounds have allowed control measures at an early stage. Traditional locust control uses insecticides from the ground or air, but newer biological control methods are proving effective. Swarming behaviour decreased in the 20th century, but despite modern surveillance and control methods, swarms can still form; when suitable weather conditions occur and vigilance lapses, plagues can occur.

Locusts are large insects and convenient for research and classroom study of zoology. They are edible by humans. They have been eaten throughout history and are considered a delicacy in many countries.

== Swarming grasshoppers ==
External videos
- "Locusts and Grasshoppers - Things to Know", Knowable Magazine, 2020.

Locusts are the swarming phase of certain species of short-horned grasshoppers in the family Acrididae. These insects are usually solitary, but under certain circumstances become more abundant and change their behaviour and habits, becoming gregarious.

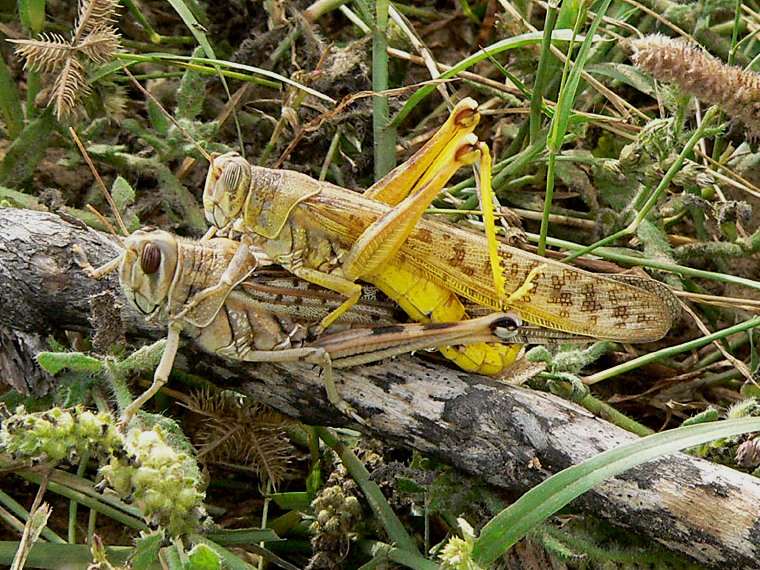
Desert locusts in copulation

No taxonomic distinction is made between locust and grasshopper species; the basis for the definition is whether a species forms swarms under intermittently suitable conditions. In English, the term "locust" is used for grasshopper species that change morphologically and behaviourally on crowding, forming swarms that develop from bands of immature stages called hoppers. The change is described as density-dependent phenotypic plasticity.

These changes are examples of phase polyphenism; they were first analysed and described by Boris Uvarov, who was instrumental in setting up the Anti-Locust Research Centre. He made his discoveries during his studies of the migratory locust in the Caucasus, whose solitary and gregarious phases had previously been thought to be separate species (Locusta migratoria and L. danica L.). He designated the two phases as solitaria and gregaria. These are called statary and migratory morphs, though strictly speaking, their swarms are nomadic rather than migratory. Charles Valentine Riley and Norman Criddle were involved in achieving the understanding and control of locusts.

Swarming behaviour is a response to overcrowding. Increased tactile stimulation of the hind legs causes an increase in levels of serotonin. This causes the locust to change colour, eat much more, and breed much more easily. The transformation of the locust to the swarming form is induced by several contacts per minute over a four-hour period. A large swarm can consist of billions of locusts spread out over an area of thousands of square kilometres, with a population of up to 80 million per square kilometre (200 million per square mile). When desert locusts meet, their nervous systems release serotonin, which causes them to become mutually attracted, a prerequisite for swarming.

Swarm-migration behaviour in juvenile desert locusts is partially mediated by cannibalistic interactions between individuals in the swarm, where locusts bite the rear of the locust in front in order to prompt forward movement. It was demonstrated that severing the nerve which allows locusts to feel these bites reduces the movement of the group and increases cannibalisation.

The formation of initial bands of gregarious hoppers is called an "outbreak"; when these join into larger groups, the event is known as an "upsurge". Continuing agglomerations of upsurges on a regional level originating from a number of entirely separate breeding locations are known as "plagues". During outbreaks and the early stages of upsurges, only part of the locust population becomes gregarious, with scattered bands of hoppers spread out over a large area. As time goes by, the insects become more cohesive and the bands become concentrated in a smaller area. In the desert locust plague in Africa, the Middle East, and Asia that lasted from 1966 to 1969, the number of locusts increased from two billion to 30 billion over two generations, but the area covered decreased from over 100,000 square kilometres (39,000 sq mi) to 5,000 square kilometres (1,900 sq mi).

=== Solitary and gregarious phases ===
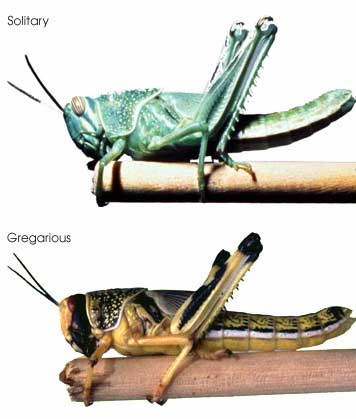
Solitaria (grasshopper) and gregaria (swarming) phases of the desert locust

One of the greatest differences between the solitary and gregarious phases is behavioural. The gregaria nymphs are attracted to each other, this being seen as early as the second instar. They soon form bands of many thousands of individuals. These groups behave like cohesive units and move across the landscape, mostly downhill, but making their way around barriers and merging with other bands. The attraction between the insects involves visual and olfactory cues. The bands seem to navigate using the sun. They pause to feed at intervals before continuing on, and may cover tens of kilometres over a few weeks.

Locusts in the gregarious phase differ in morphology and development. In the desert locust and the migratory locust, for example, the gregaria nymphs become darker with strongly contrasting yellow and black markings, they grow larger, and have a longer nymphal period; the adults are larger with different body proportions, less sexual dimorphism, and higher metabolic rates; they mature more rapidly and start reproducing earlier, but have lower levels of fecundity.

The mutual attraction between individual insects continues into adulthood, and they continue to act as a cohesive group. Individuals that get detached from a swarm fly back into the mass. Others that get left behind after feeding take off to rejoin the swarm when it passes overhead. When individuals at the front of the swarm settle to feed, others fly past overhead and settle in their turn, the whole swarm acting like a rolling unit with an ever-changing leading edge. The locusts spend much time on the ground feeding and resting, moving on when the vegetation is exhausted. They may then fly a considerable distance before settling in a location where transitory rainfall has caused a green flush of new growth.

== Distribution and diversity ==
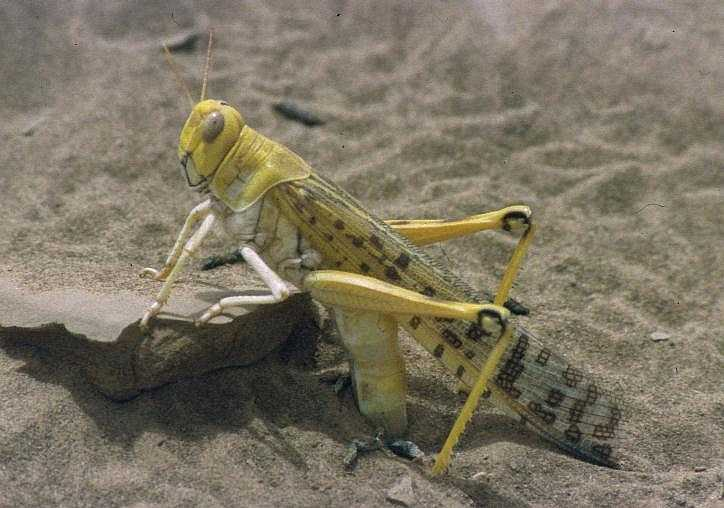
Desert locust ovipositing during a locust outbreak

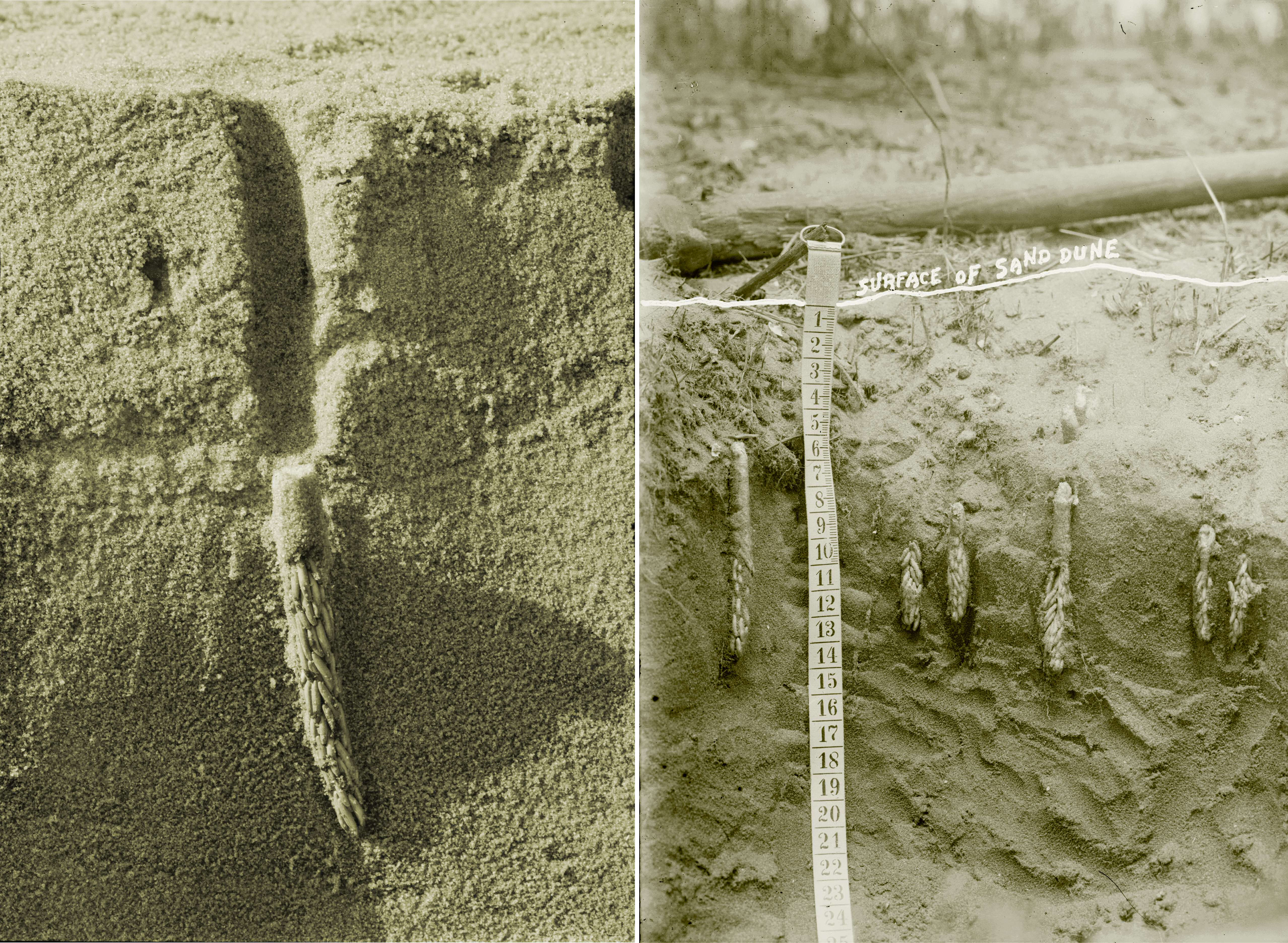
Clusters of desert locust eggs laid in sand

Several species of grasshoppers swarm as locusts in different parts of the world, on all continents except Antarctica: (Note: The American locust (Schistocerca americana) does not swarm.) For example, the Australian plague locust (Chortoicetes terminifera) swarms across Australia.

The desert locust (Schistocerca gregaria) is probably the best known species owing to its wide distribution (North Africa, Middle East, and Indian subcontinent) and its ability to migrate over long distances. A major infestation covered much of western Africa from 2003 to 2005, after unusually heavy rain set up favourable ecological conditions for swarming. The first outbreaks occurred in Mauritania, Mali, Niger, and Sudan in 2003. The rain allowed swarms to develop and move north to Morocco and Algeria, threatening croplands. Swarms crossed Africa, appearing in Egypt, Jordan and Israel, the first time in those countries for 50 years. The cost of handling the infestation was put at US$122 million, and the damage to crops at up to $2.5 billion.

The migratory locust (Locusta migratoria), sometimes classified into up to 10 subspecies, swarms in Africa, Asia, Australia, and New Zealand, but has become rare in Europe. In 2013, the Madagascan form of the migratory locust formed many swarms of over a billion insects, reaching "plague" status and covering about half the country by March 2013. Species such as the Senegalese grasshopper (Oedaleus senegalensis) and the African rice grasshopper (Hieroglyphus daganensis), both from the Sahel, often display locust-like behaviour and change morphologically on crowding.

In North America, the Rocky Mountain locust was formerly one of the most significant insect pests, but it became extinct in 1902. In the 1930s, during the Dust Bowl, a second species of North American locust, the High Plains locust (Dissosteira longipennis), reached plague proportions in the American Midwest. Today, the High Plains locust is a rare species, leaving North America with no regularly swarming locusts.

=== Evolution ===
The fossilized wing of an indeterminate locust has been found in Early Oligocene-aged sediments of the Pabdeh Formation in Iran, which were deposited in a deep marine environment. The locust was likely migrating across the early Paratethys Sea, between the emergent Arabian Peninsula and central Iran, which were still separated by large areas of deep ocean at this time. This suggests that trans-oceanic locust migrations have been occurring for at least 30 million years, likely facilitated by the spread of grasslands at the time.

== Interaction with humans and animals ==
=== Ancient times ===
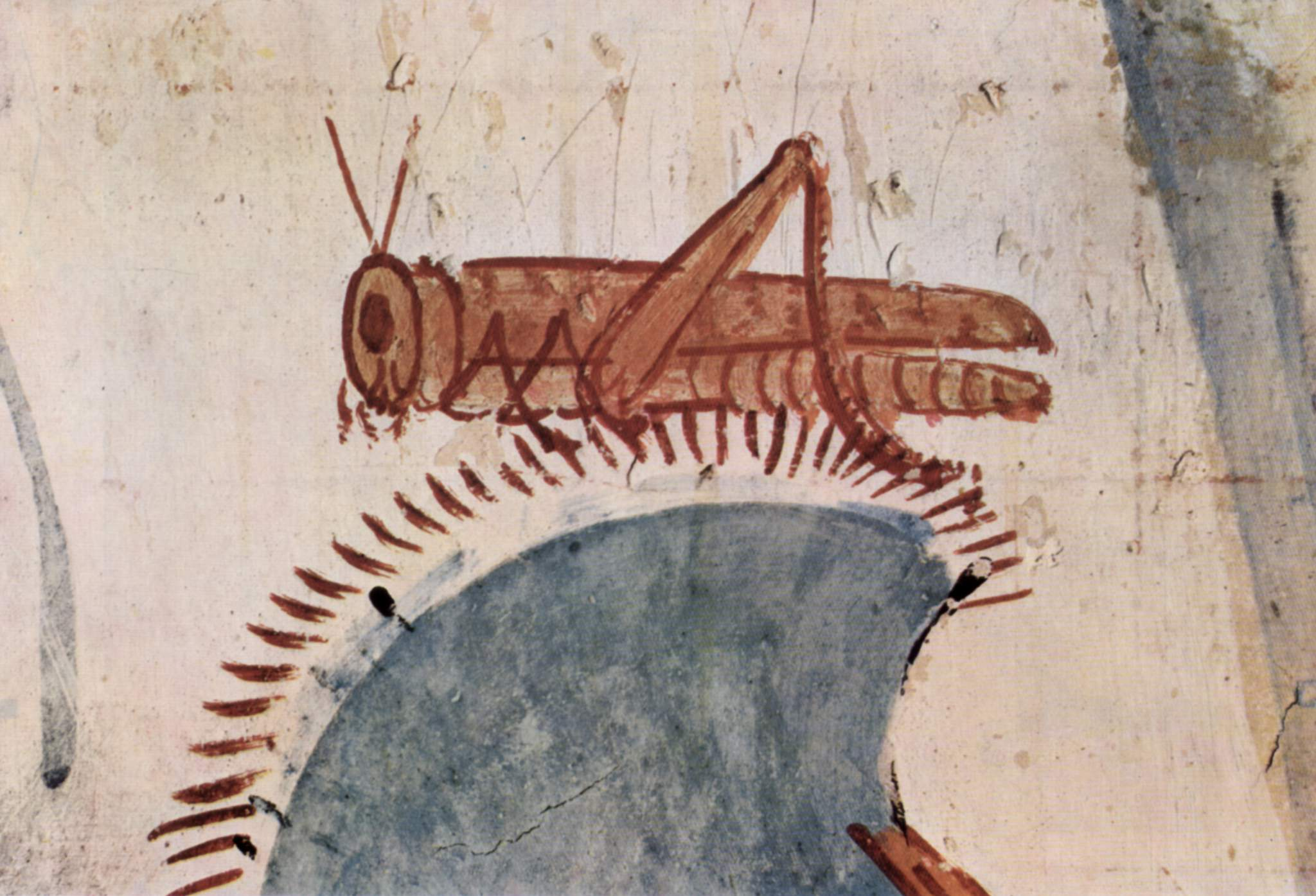
Locust detail from a hunt mural in the grave-chamber of Horemhab, Ancient Egypt, circa 1422–1411 BC

Study of literature shows how pervasive plagues of locusts were over the course of history. The insects arrived unexpectedly, often after a change of wind direction or weather, and the consequences were devastating. The Ancient Egyptians carved locusts on tombs in the period 2470 to 2220 BC. A devastating plague in Egypt is mentioned in the Book of Exodus in the Bible. Locust plague is mentioned in the Indian Mahabharata. The Iliad mentions locusts taking to the wing to escape fire. Plagues of locusts are mentioned in the Quran. In the ninth century BC, the Chinese authorities appointed anti-locust officers. In the New Testament, John the Baptist was said to survive in the wilderness on locusts and wild honey; and human-headed locusts appear in the Book of Revelation.

Aristotle studied locusts and their breeding habits and Livy recorded a devastating plague in Capua in 203 BC. He mentioned human epidemics following locust plagues which he associated with the stench from the putrifying corpses; the linking of human disease outbreaks to locust plagues was widespread. A pestilence in the northwestern provinces of China in 311 AD that killed 98% of the population locally was blamed on locusts, and may have been caused by an increase in numbers of rats (and their fleas) that devoured the locust carcasses.

=== Recent times ===
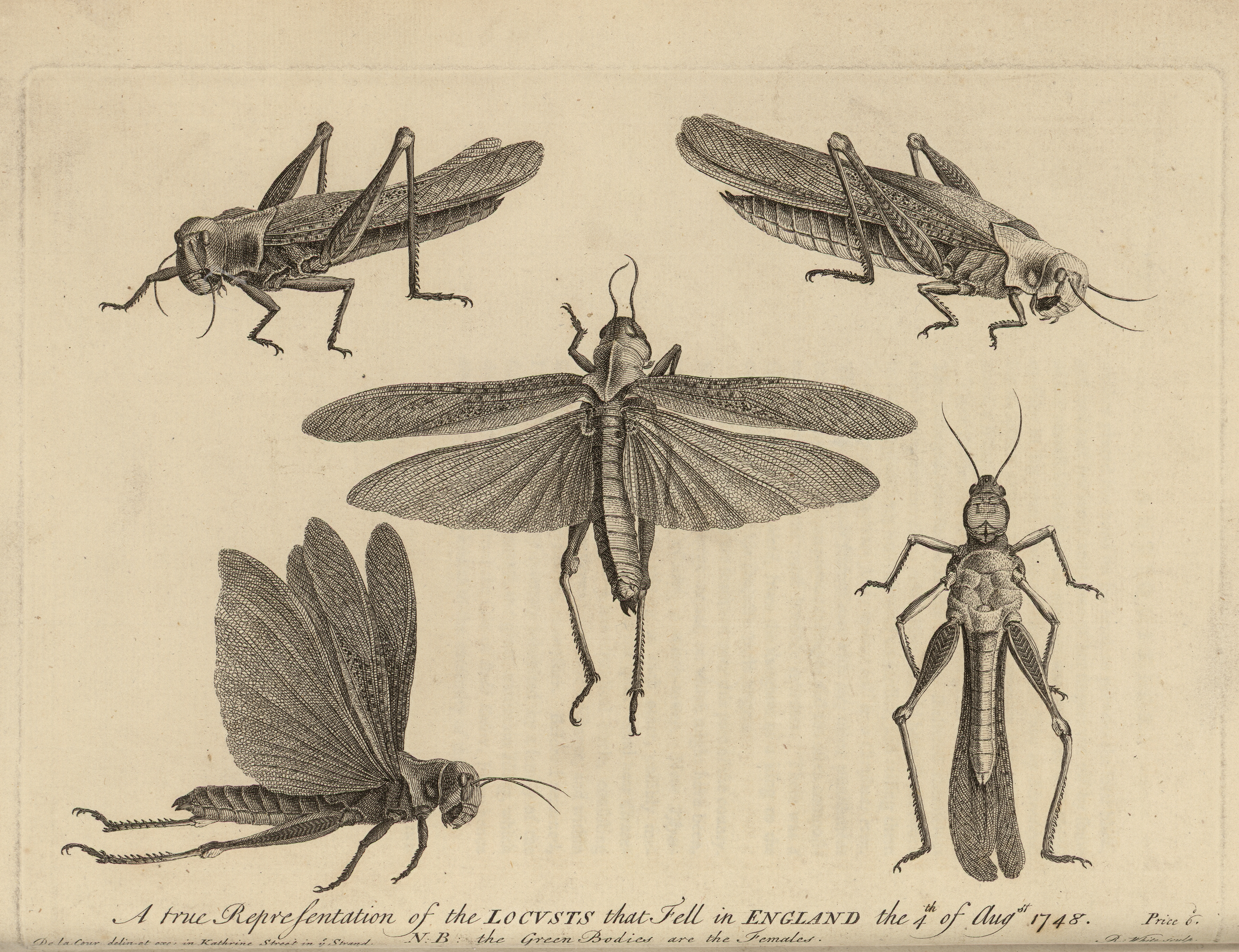
Locusts which swarmed over England in 1748: Drawing by De la Cour; engraved by R. White, in Thomas Pennant's A Tour in Wales, 1781

During the last two millennia, desert locust plagues have appeared sporadically in Africa, the Middle East, and Europe. Other species of locusts caused havoc in North and South America, Asia, and Australasia; in China, 173 outbreaks over 1924 years. The Bombay locust (Nomadacris succincta) was a major pest in India and southeastern Asia in the 18th and 19th centuries, but has seldom swarmed since the last plague in 1908.

In the spring of 1747 locusts arrived outside Damascus eating the majority of the crops and vegetation of the surrounding countryside. One local barber, Ahmad al-Budayri, recalled the locusts "came like a black cloud. They covered everything: the trees and the crops. May God Almighty save us!"

The extinction of the Rocky Mountain locust has been a source of puzzlement. It had swarmed throughout the west of the United States and parts of Canada in the 19th century. Albert's swarm of 1875 was estimated to contain 12.5 trillion insects covering an area of 198,000 square miles (510,000 km^{2}) (larger than the state of California) and to weigh 27.5 million tons. The last specimen was seen alive in Canada in 1902. Recent research suggests the breeding grounds of this insect in the valleys of the Rocky Mountains came under sustained agricultural development during the large influx of gold miners, destroying the underground eggs of the locust.

The 1915 infestation across Palestine and Syria was one of the main contributors to the 1915–1918 Great Famine of Mount Lebanon, which caused some 200,000 deaths. Plagues became less common in the 20th century, but they continue to occur when the conditions are met.

=== Monitoring ===
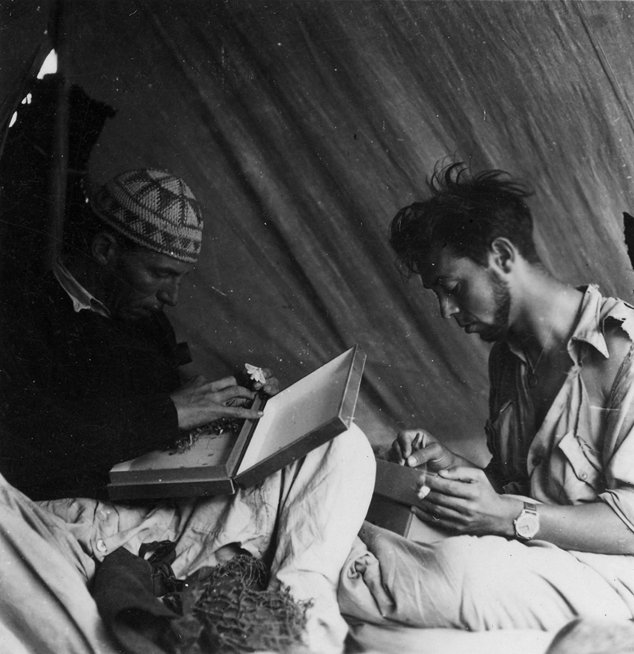
Eugenio Morales Agacino on expedition monitoring locusts in the desert of Spanish Sahara, 1942

Early intervention to prevent large locust swarms is more successful than later action once swarms have built up. The means to control locust populations is now available, but organisational, financial, and political problems may be difficult to overcome. Monitoring is the key to early detection and eradication. Ideally, a sufficient proportion of nomadic bands can be killed with insecticide before their swarming phase. This may be possible in richer countries like Morocco and Saudi Arabia, but neighbouring poorer countries such as Mauritania and Yemen lack the resources and may breed locust swarms that threaten the whole region.

Several organisations around the world monitor the threat from locusts. They provide forecasts detailing regions likely to suffer from locust plagues in the near future. In Australia, this service is provided by the Australian Plague Locust Commission. It has been very successful in dealing with developing outbreaks, but has the great advantage of having a defined area to monitor and defend without locust invasions from elsewhere. In Central and Southern Africa, the service is provided by the International Locust Control Organization for Central and Southern Africa. In West and Northwest Africa, the service is co-ordinated by the Food and Agriculture Organization's Commission for Controlling the Desert Locust in the Western Region, and executed by locust control agencies belonging to each country concerned. The FAO monitors the situation in the Caucasus and Central Asia, where over 25 million hectares of cultivated land are under threat. In February 2020, in an effort to end massive locust outbreaks, India decided to use drones and special equipment to monitor locusts and spray insecticides.

=== Control ===
Historically, people could do little to protect their crops from locusts, although eating the insects may have been some compensation. By the early 20th century, efforts were made to disrupt the development of the insects by cultivating the soil where eggs were laid, collecting hoppers with catching machines, killing them with flamethrowers, trapping them in ditches, and crushing them with rollers and other mechanical methods. By the 1950s, the organochloride dieldrin was found to be an extremely effective insecticide, but it was later banned in most countries because of its persistence in the environment and its accumulation in the food chain.

In years when locust control is needed, the hoppers have been targeted early by applying contact insecticides from tractor-based sprayers. This can be effective but slow and labour-intensive, so a preferable method is spraying at ultra-low volume (ULV) rates, using concentrated pesticides. ULV spraying of contact pesticides, using aircraft or specialised ground-based equipment to apply overlapping swathes over vegetation or nomadic bands, treats large areas of land swiftly and effectively. Other modern technologies for planning locust control include GPS, GIS tools, and satellite imagery with rapid computer data management and analysis.

A biological pesticide to control locusts was tested across Africa by the multinational LUBILOSA team in 1997. Dried fungal spores of a Metarhizium acridum sprayed in breeding areas pierce the locust exoskeleton on germination and invade the body cavity, causing death. The fungus is passed from insect to insect and persists in the area, making repeated treatments unnecessary. This approach to locust control was used in Tanzania in 2009 to treat around 10,000 hectares in the Iku-Katavi National Park infested with adult locusts. The outbreak was contained without harm to the local elephants, hippopotamuses, and giraffes.

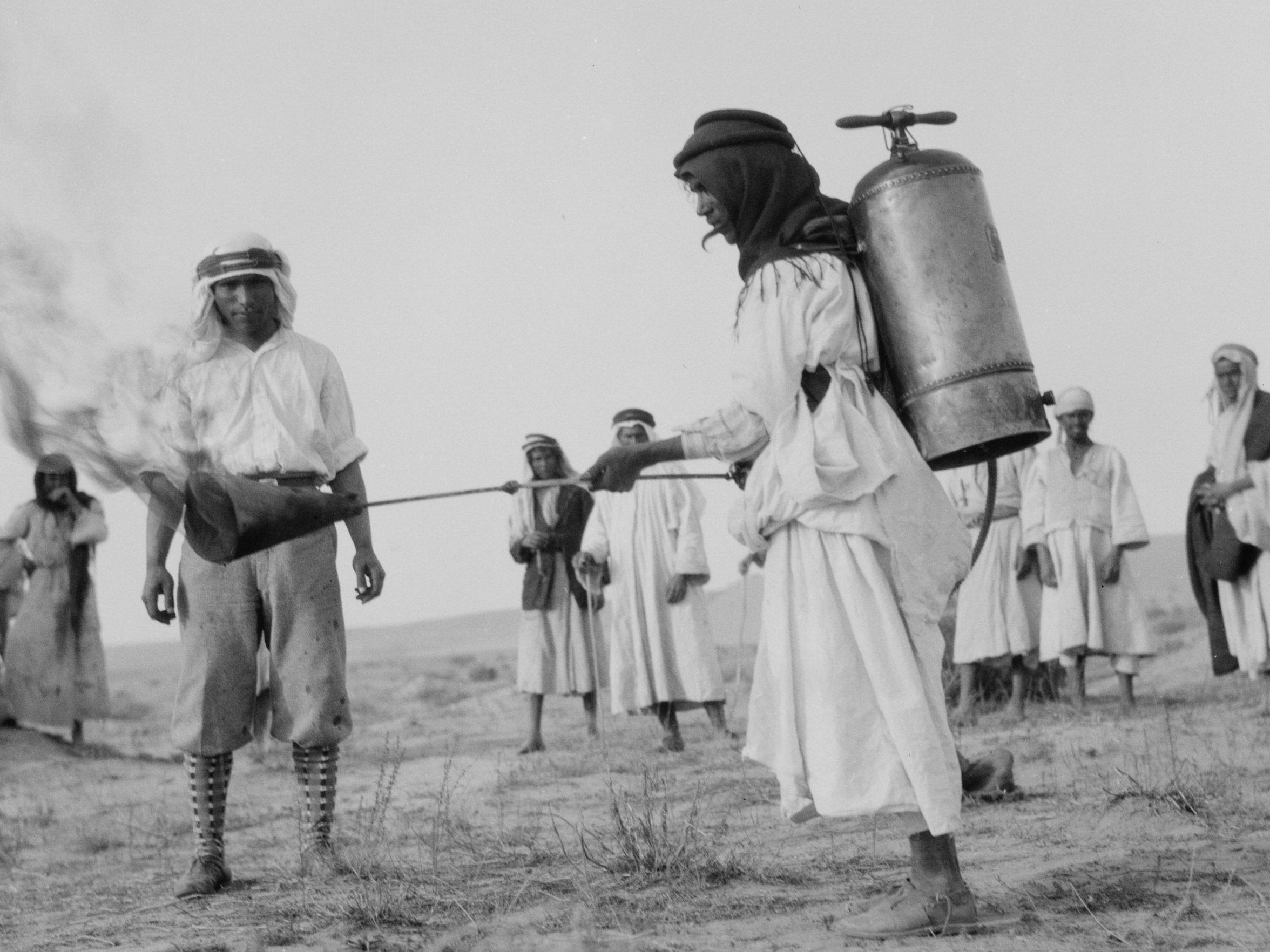
Preparing to flame locusts in Palestine, 1915

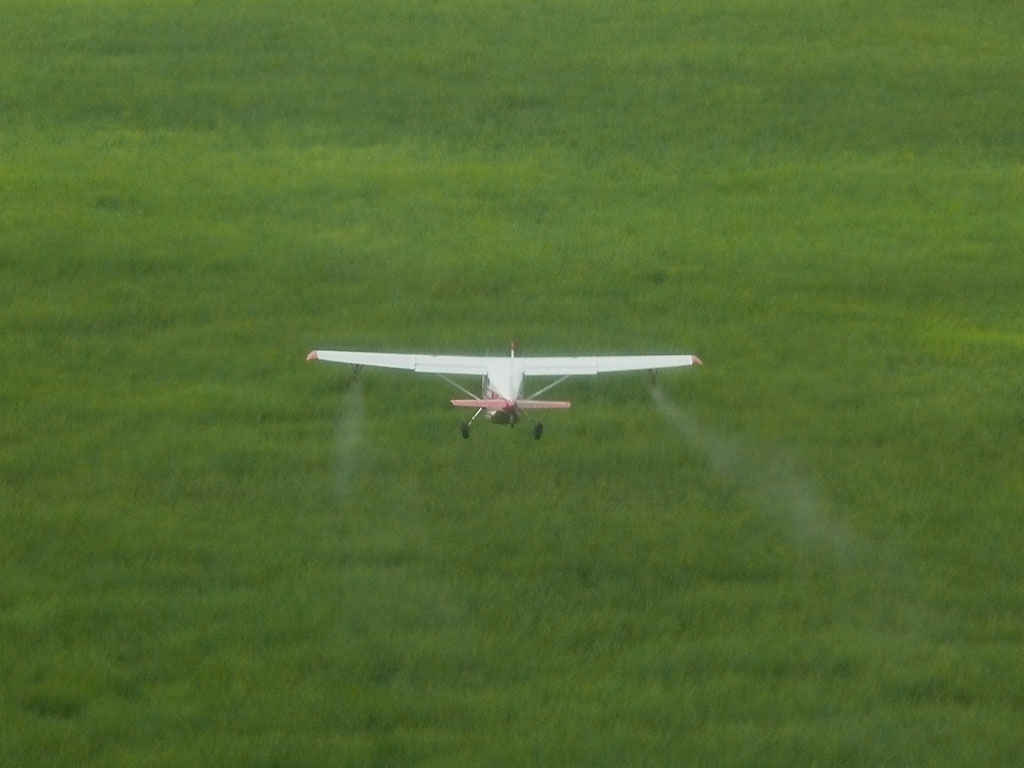
Cessna of the International Red Locust Control Organization spraying red locusts in Iku Katavi National Park, Tanzania, 2009

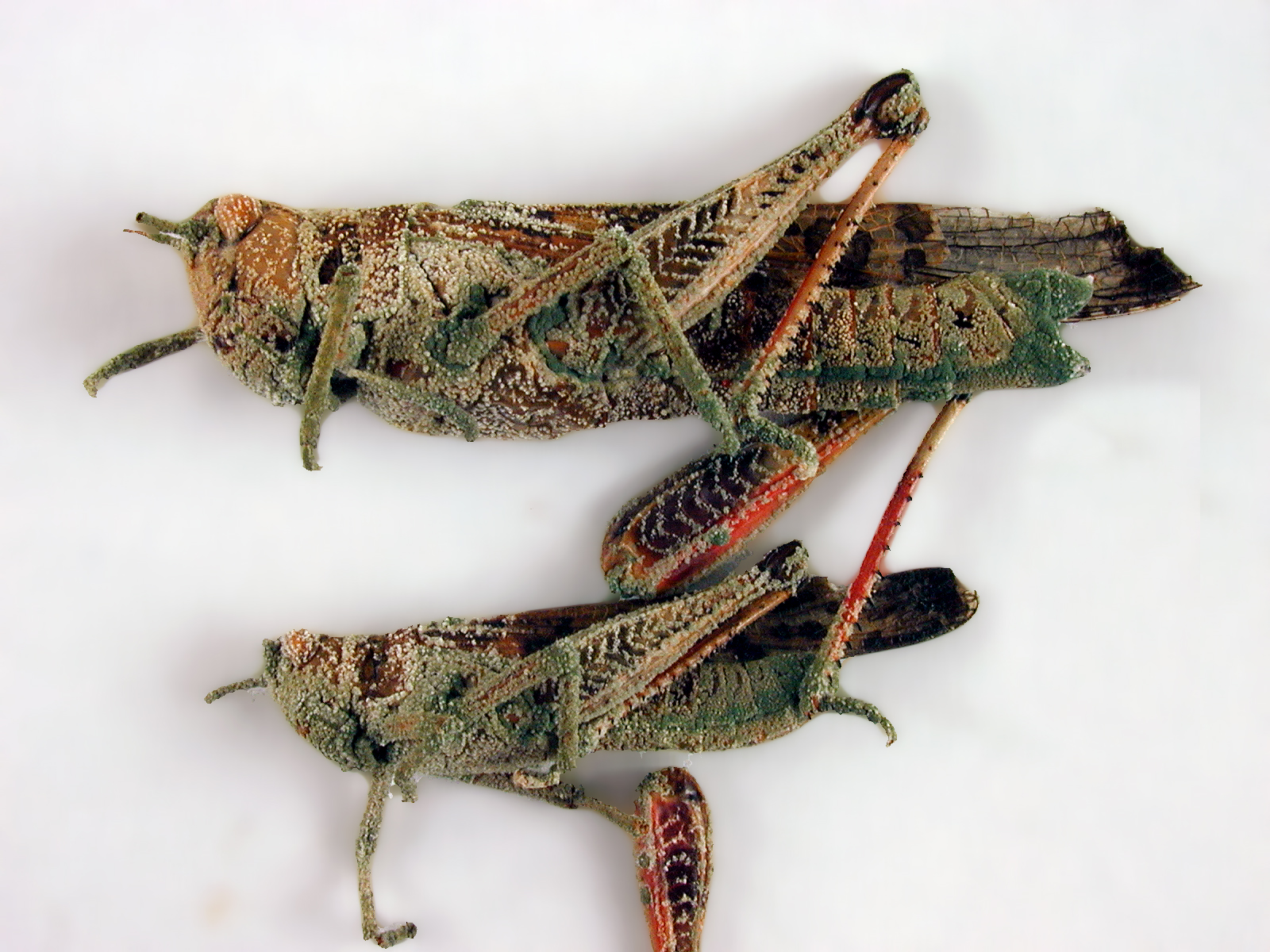
Locusts killed by the naturally occurring fungus Metarhizium, an environmentally friendly means of biological control

=== As experimental models ===
The locust is large and easy to breed and rear, and is used as an experimental model in research studies. It has been used in evolutionary biology research and to test the generalizability of conclusions reached about test organisms such as the fruit fly (Drosophila) and the housefly (Musca). It is a suitable school laboratory animal because of its robustness and ease of breeding and handling.

At Tel Aviv University, scientists have been using the acute sense of smell mediated by locust antennae to detect different odors in robotic applications.

=== As food ===
==== Historic usage ====
Locusts have been used as food throughout history in various parts of the world. The Torah prohibits the use of most insects as food, but it permits consuming certain types of locust; specifically, those that are red, yellow, or spotted grey. The Bible records that John the Baptist ate locusts and wild honey (Greek: ἀκρίδες καὶ μέλι ἄγριον, romanized: akrídes kaì méli ágrion) while living in the wilderness. Attempts have been made to explain the text to mean ascetic vegetarian food such as carob beans, but the plain meaning of the Greek akrides is locust. The Prophet Muhammad was reported to have eaten locusts during a military raid with his companions.

==== Current cultural variation ====
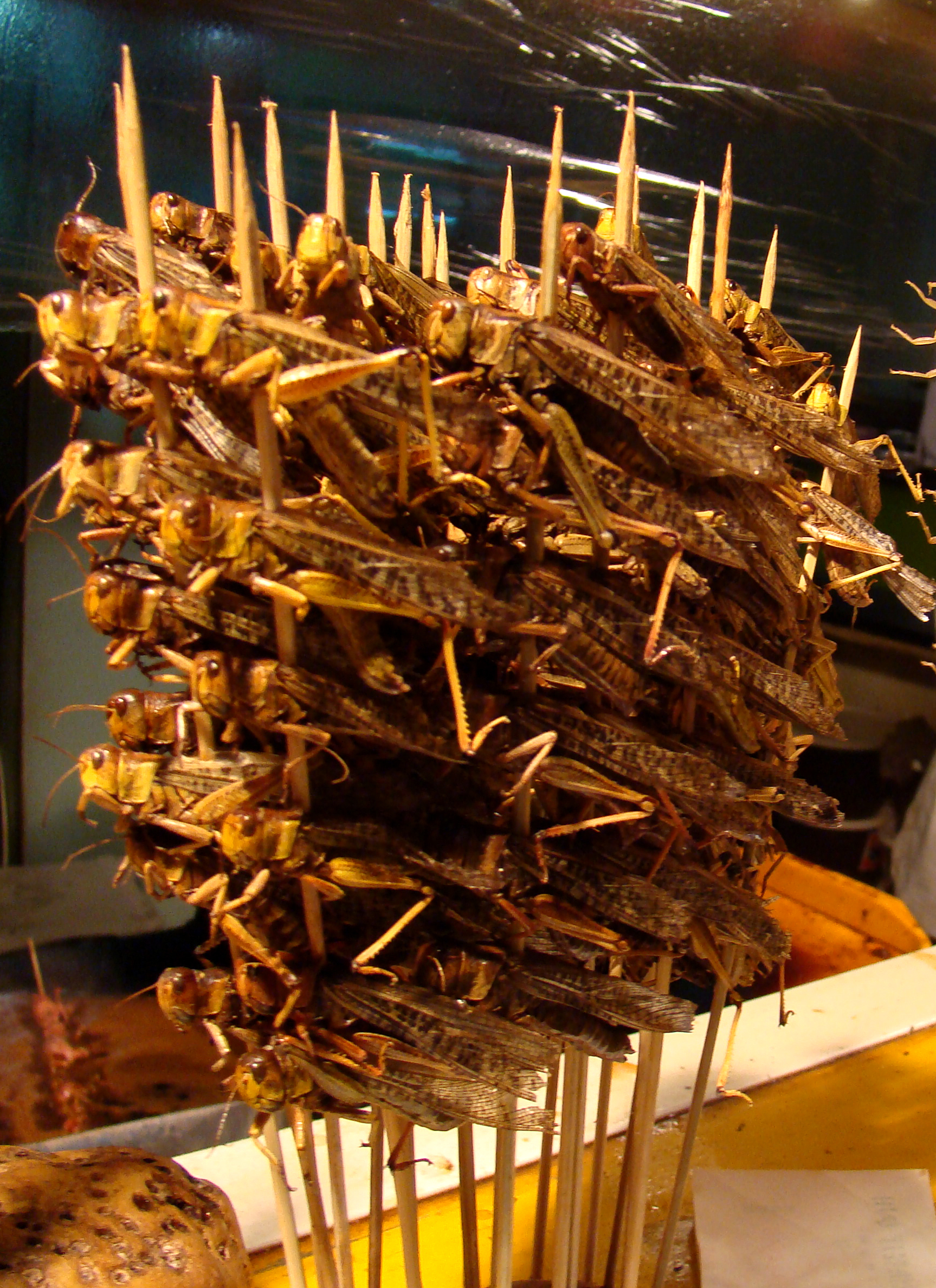
Skewered locusts in Beijing, China

Several cultures throughout the world consume insects, and locusts are considered a delicacy in many African, Middle Eastern, and Asian countries. In the Haouran region, Fellahs who were in poverty and suffered from famine ate locusts after removing the guts and head, while locusts were swallowed whole by Bedouins. Syrians, Copts, Greeks, Armenians, and other Christians and Arabs themselves reported that in Arabia locusts were eaten frequently and one Arab described to a European traveler the different types of locusts which were favored as food by Arabs. Persians use the Anti-Arab racial slur Arabe malakh-khor (Persian: عرب ملخ خور, literally "locust eater Arab") against Arabs.

Islamic jurisprudence deems eating locusts to be halal. Locusts are eaten in the Arabian Peninsula, including Saudi Arabia. In 2014, consumption of locusts spiked around Ramadan especially in the Al-Qassim Region, since many Saudis believe they are healthy to eat, but the Saudi Ministry of Health warned that pesticides made them unsafe. Yemenis also consume locusts, and expressed discontent over governmental plans to use pesticides against them. ʻAbd al-Salâm Shabînî described a locust recipe from Morocco. 19th century European travellers observed Arabs in Arabia, Egypt, and Morocco selling, cooking, and eating locusts. They reported that in Egypt and Palestine locusts were consumed, and that in Palestine, around the River Jordan, in Egypt, in Arabia, and in Morocco that Arabs ate locusts, while Syrian peasants did not eat locusts.

==== Usage and nutrition ====
Locusts are considered as meat. They can be cooked in many ways, but are often fried, smoked, or dried. They yield about five times more edible protein per unit of fodder than cattle, and produce lower levels of greenhouse gases in the process. The feed conversion rate of orthopterans is 1.7 kg/kg, while for beef it is typically about 10 kg/kg. The protein content in fresh weight is between 13 and 28 g / 100 g for adult locust, 14–18 g / 100 g for larvae, as compared to 19–26 g / 100 g for beef. The calculated protein efficiency ratio is low, with 1.69 for locust protein compared to 2.5 for standard casein. A serving of 100 g of desert locust provides 11.5 g of fat, 53.5% of which is unsaturated, and 286 mg of cholesterol. Among the fatty acids, palmitoleic, oleic, and linolenic acids were found to be the most abundant. Varying amounts of potassium, sodium, phosphorus, calcium, magnesium, iron, and zinc were present.

== See also ==
- Australian Plague Locust Commission
- List of locust swarms
- Locust (ethnic slur)
- LUBILOSA – Locust research programme
- Periodical cicadas
