= Plaque =

Plaque may refer to:

== Commemorations or awards ==
- Commemorative plaque, a plate, usually fixed to a wall or other vertical surface, meant to mark an event, person, etc.
- Memorial Plaque (medallion), issued to next-of-kin of dead British military personnel after World War I
- Plaquette, a small plaque in bronze or other materials

== Science and healthcare ==
- Amyloid plaques, an extracellular protein deposit in the brain implicated in Alzheimer's disease
- Atheroma or atheromatous plaque, a buildup of deposits within the wall of an artery
- Dental plaque, a biofilm that builds up on teeth
- A broad papule, a type of cutaneous condition
- Pleural plaque, associated with mesothelioma, cancer often caused by exposure to asbestos
- Skin plaque, a plateau-like lesion that is greater in its diameter than in its depth
- Viral plaque, a visible structure formed by virus propagation within a cell culture

== Other uses ==
- Plaque, a rectangular casino token

== See also ==
- Builder's plate
- Plac (disambiguation)
- Placard
- Plack (disambiguation)
- Plague (disambiguation)
