= List of locust swarms =

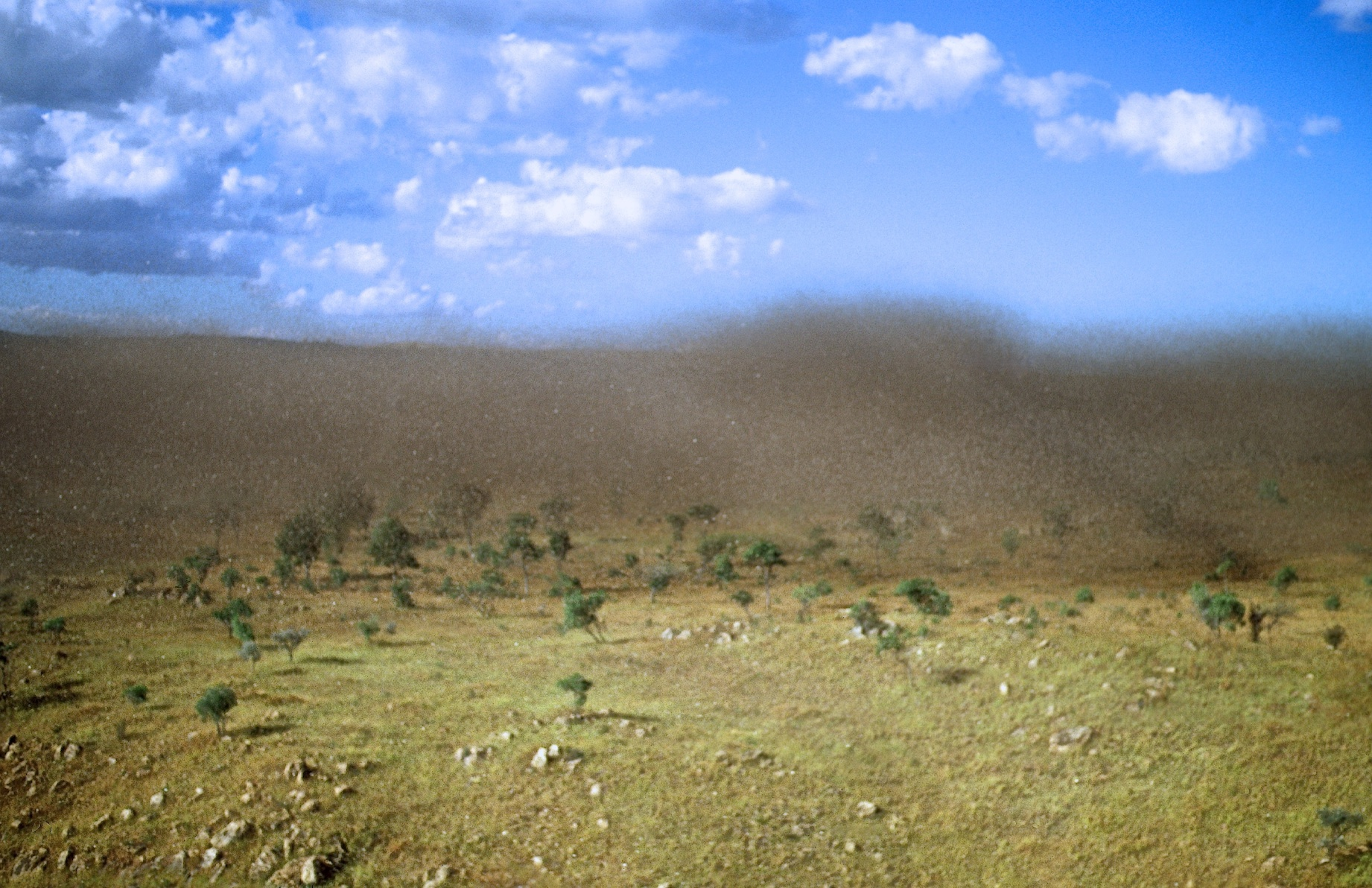
Large swarm of the migratory locust (Locusta migratoria) in Madagascar

Locust swarms have been recorded throughout history. Those which have their own Wikipedia articles are listed here.

Swarm	Year	Location	Size	Type
Locust Plague of 1874	1874	United States		Rocky Mountain locust
Albert's swarm	1875	United States	3.5–12.5 trillion	Rocky Mountain locust
1915 Ottoman Syria locust infestation	1915	Palestine, Lebanon, and Syria		
2003–2005 Africa locust infestation	2003–05	West Africa		
2013 Madagascar locust infestation	2013	Madagascar	billions	Migratory locust
January 2016 Argentine locust swarm	2016	Argentina		
2019–2022 locust infestation	2019	Ethiopia, Kenya, Eritrea, Djibouti, Somalia, Iran, India, and Pakistan		Desert locust

== See also ==
- List of rodent plagues
