= 1915 Ottoman Syria locust plague =

1915 Ottoman Syria locust infestation
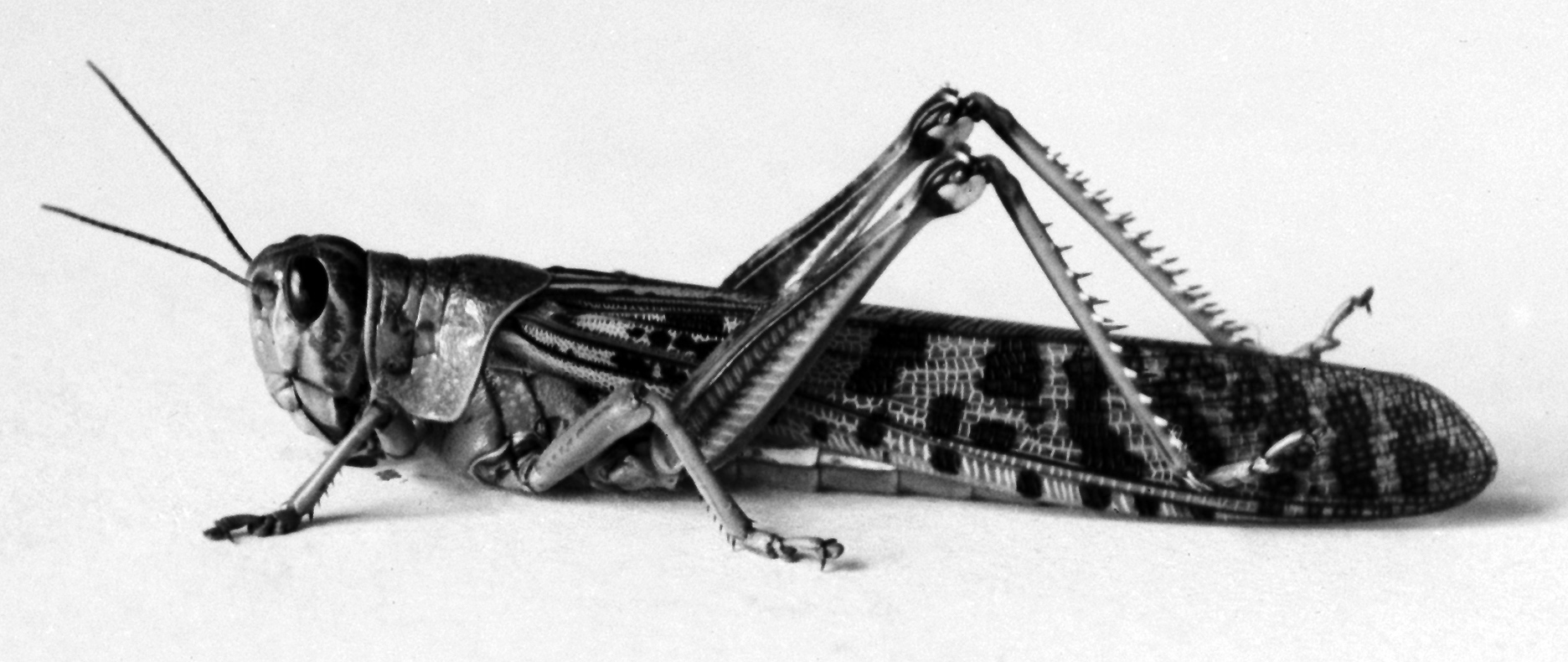
- Locust from the 1915 infestation
- Date: March 1915–October 1915
- Location: Palestine, Mount Lebanon and Syria, Ottoman Syria, Ottoman Empire
- Cause: Swarms of locusts
- Outcome: Higher food prices; starvation

From March to October 1915, swarms of locusts stripped areas in and around northern modern-day Israel, Palestine, Mount Lebanon and Syria of almost all vegetation. This infestation seriously compromised the already-depleted food supply of the region and sharpened the misery of all in the region.

Historian Zachary J. Foster argues that the scale of the attack was far worse than anything Syria had witnessed in many decades. He suggested further that a huge percentage of the region's major foodstuffs and sources of livelihood, including fruits, vegetables, legumes, fodder and a small but not insignificant amount of the cereals, were devoured by the locusts. "The attack diminished the 1915 winter harvest (wheat and barley) by 10–15 per cent", he noted, "and completely wrecked the 1915 summer and autumn harvests (fruits and vegetables), in ranges varying from 60 to 100 per cent, depending on the crop".

The crop destruction resulted in several increases to the price of food. On 25 April 1915, The New York Times described the price increases. "Flour costs $15 a sack. Potatoes are six times the ordinary price. Sugar and petroleum are unprocurable and money has ceased to circulate." Among the consequences of the event was the Great Famine of Mount Lebanon, which led to the deaths of nearly one half of Mount Lebanon Mutasarrifate inhabitants from hunger and disease between 1915 and 1918.

== Reaction ==
Djemal Pasha, who was the Supreme Commander of Syria and Arabia at the time of the locust infestation, launched a campaign to limit the devastation of the incident. He appointed an official to fight the infestation.

Rabbi A.M. Luntz, who personally observed the development of the infestation said that the "Badatz decreed that on the following day there should be a Taanit Tzibbur (public fast) and the whole day should be one of repentance (selichot), prayer and petition. After a few days the locusts left the Land", as locusts do after they have finished feeding. However, in the amount of time they nested there, the locusts replenished themselves with new larvae.

== Regulations ==
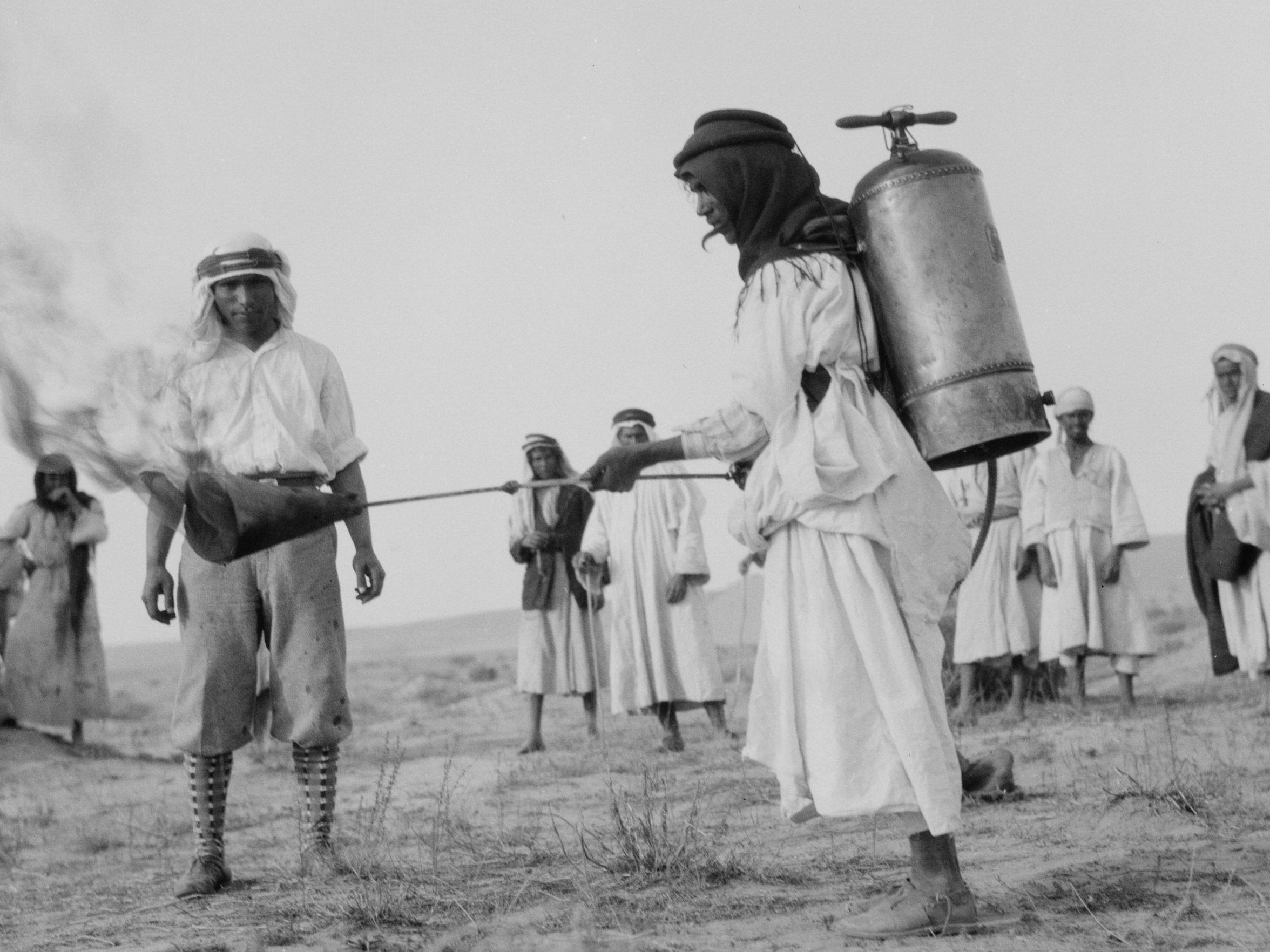
A portable flamethrower being prepared to destroy locusts in Palestine, 1915

Midhat Bey, who was the official appointed to fight the infestation, helped enact a law which required every male between ages 15 and 60 in cities to collect 20 kilograms of locust eggs or pay a fine of £4.40. The New York Times reported that this law was strictly enforced. They said that people who failed to follow the law risked having their businesses closed. 800 had paid the fine by 21 November 1915.

== Aftermath ==
The Great Famine of Mount Lebanon (1915–1918) was a period of mass starvation during World War I. The Allies' blockade was made worse by another introduced by Djemal Pasha, the commander of the Fourth Army of the Ottoman Empire in Syria region, where crops were barred from entering from the neighboring Syrian hinterland to Mount Lebanon, and by the locusts infestation in 1915. The famine was caused by a convergence of political and environmental factors that lead to the death of half of the population of Mount Lebanon Mutasarrifate, a semi-autonomous subdivision of the Ottoman Empire and the precursor of modern-day Lebanon.

== See also ==
- List of locust swarms
