= 2013 Madagascar locust plague =

2013 Madagascar locust infestation
- Date: March 2013
- Location: Madagascar
- Cause: Malagasy migratory locust (Locusta migratoria capito)

In 2012, Madagascar had an upsurge in the size of its Malagasy migratory locust (Locusta Migratoria Capito) populations. In November of that year, the government issued a locust alert, saying that conditions were right for swarming of the pest insects. In February 2013, Cyclone Haruna struck the country, creating optimal conditions for locust breeding. By late March 2013, approximately 50% of the country was infested by swarms of locusts, with each swarm consisting of more than one billion insects. The authorities changed the situation to plague status. According to one eyewitness: "You don't see anything except locusts. You turn around, there are locusts everywhere".

News of the infestation went global the week before Passover, inspiring comparisons with the Biblical Plagues of Egypt, one of which was a swarm of locusts. It was the worst locust outbreak in Madagascar since a 17-year-long outbreak which began during the 1950s.

== Pest control ==
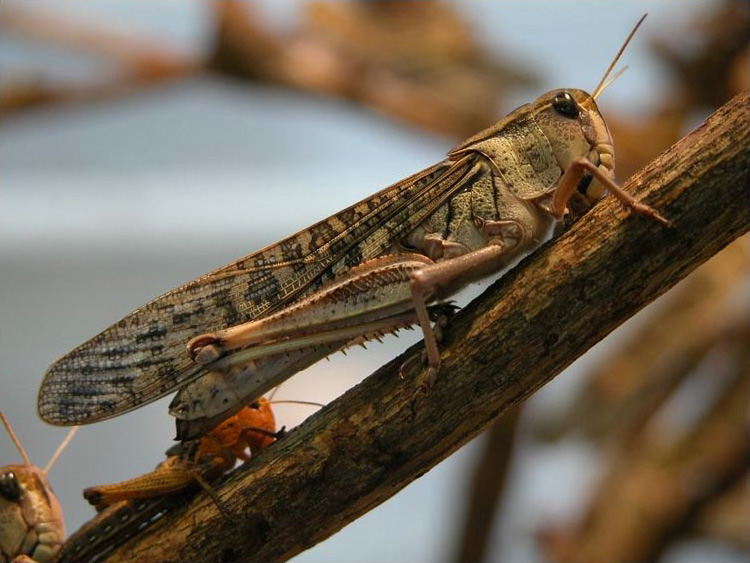
A female migratory locust sitting on a branch with a juvenile in the background

On March 26, 2013, the Food and Agriculture Organization (FAO) of the United Nations called for US$41 million of donations to fight the locusts. Under the proposed aid plan, $22 million would be delivered by June for pest control efforts and $19 million would be devoted to a three-year plan to keep the insect in check. According to the FAO report, the infestation threatened 60% of the country's rice crop, as well as livestock pastures. Rice was considered a staple crop in Madagascar, a nation where a large percentage of the population lives in famine conditions. In the southwestern region of Madagascar, where the locusts were the worst, 80% of the population lived in poverty.

The FAO plan called for large-scale aerial operations to spray extra pesticides over 1.5 million hectares (3.7 million acres) of land from 2013 to 2014. According to the national Locust Control Centre, 100,000 out of 130,000 hectares (257,000 out of 321,000 acres) of vulnerable crop land had not been treated at the time of the FAO proposal. If no action was taken, the FAO estimated that two-thirds of Madagascar would be infested by September, and said the infestation could last for five to ten years. "Failure to respond now will lead to massive food aid requirements later on," said Dominique Burgeon, Director of the FAO Emergency and Rehabilitation Division. Additionally, the infestation threatened the habitat of numerous endangered species, especially several species of lemur.

Implementation began swiftly: by December 2013, aerial spraying had eliminated hopper bands and locust adults on close to 50,000 hectares, and a three-year control program was underway using helicopters, ground vehicles, and environmentally considered pesticides; including a fungus-based biopesticide in sensitive zones.

FAO-funded operations by mid-2015 revealed:

- A total of US $28.8 million had been spent since 2013.
- An additional $10.6 million was urgently required to complete the campaign.

In February 2016, ongoing efforts had controlled locust populations across 223,533 hectares since the third campaign began in August 2015. By September 2016, Madagascar’s three-year locust control campaign successfully contained the plague. Thanks to international donors—including Austria, Belgium, France, Italy, Japan, the World Bank, Norway, USAID, and the EU—the effort reached critical mass and avoided a relapse.

== Aftermath ==
In the aftermath, FAO and Madagascar’s Locust Control Centre shifted to routine monitoring and early-action strategies. As part of this pivot, efforts in 2021–22 treated nearly 400,000 hectares ahead of seasonal breeding seasons, supported by Germany and other partners.

By September 2024, a UN‑funded “anticipatory action” plan equipped local control centres, bolstered surveillance, and pre-positioned aerial resources, including helicopter contracts initiated for the 2024–27 period.

== See also ==
- List of locust swarms
