= Cyclone Haruna =

South-West Indian tropical cyclone in 2013

Tropical Cyclone Haruna
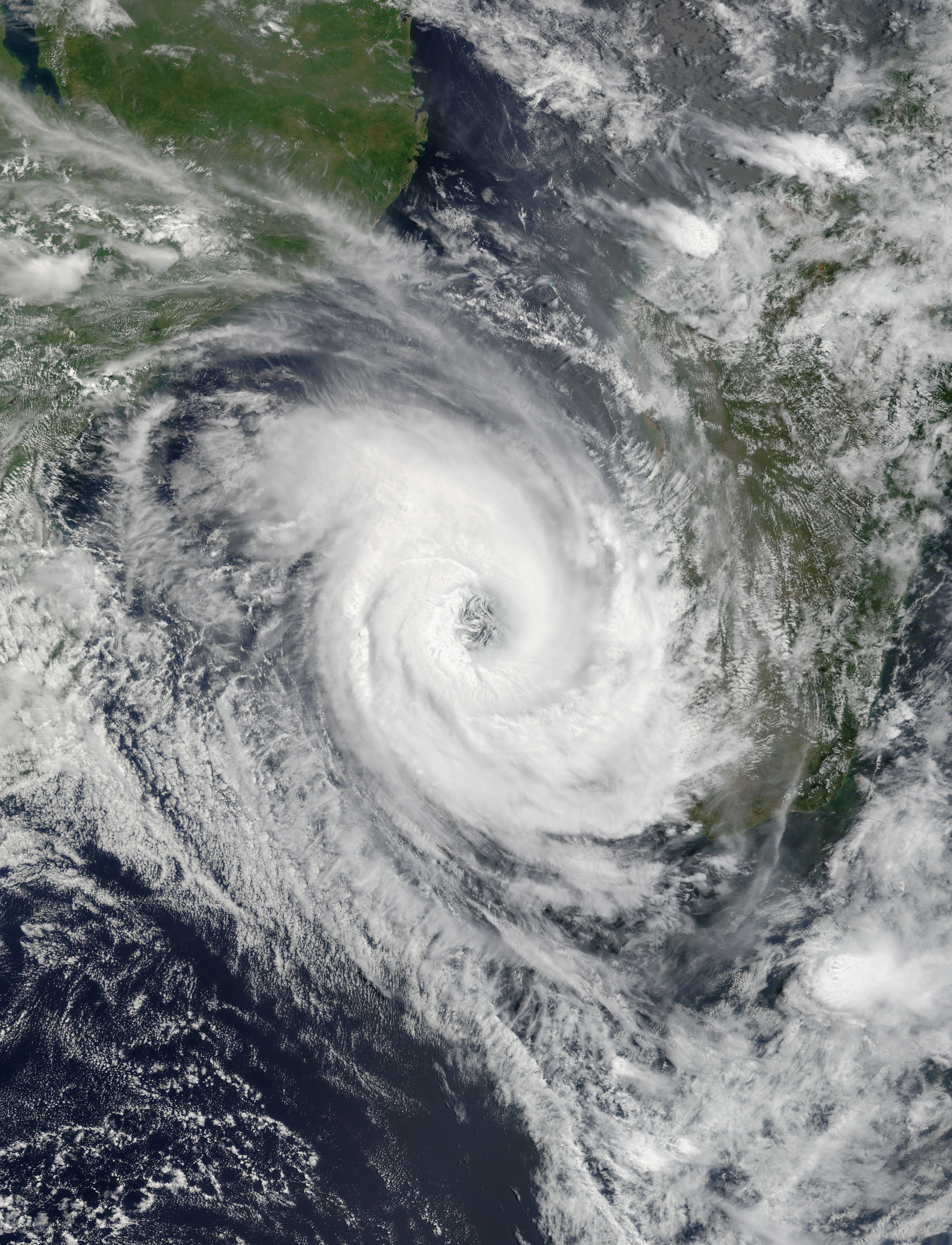
- Tropical Cyclone Haruna near peak intensity on February 21

Meteorological history
- Formed: February 14, 2013
- Remnant low: February 25
- Dissipated: February 28, 2013

Tropical cyclone
- 10-minute sustained (MFR)
- Highest winds: 150 km/h (90 mph)
- Lowest pressure: 960 hPa (mbar); 28.35 inHg

Category 3-equivalent tropical cyclone
- 1-minute sustained (SSHWS/JTWC)
- Highest winds: 195 km/h (120 mph)
- Lowest pressure: 944 hPa (mbar); 27.88 inHg

Overall effects
- Fatalities: 25 total
- Areas affected: Mozambique, Madagascar
- IBTrACS
- Part of the 2012–13 South-West Indian Ocean cyclone season

Tropical Cyclone Haruna was a deadly storm that produced widespread flooding and a disease outbreak in southwestern Madagascar. The ninth system of the season, Haruna developed in the Mozambique Channel in the middle of February 2013 between Mozambique and southwestern Madagascar. Initially moving northward over Mozambique, the disturbance later moved slowly southward, gradually strengthening into the eighth named storm of the season and later into an intense tropical cyclone. The Météo-France office in Réunion (MFR) – the official Regional Specialized Meteorological Center in the basin – estimated the cyclone attained peak 10 minute sustained winds of 150 km/h (95 mph). Haruna made landfall near Morombe in southwestern Madagascar on February 22. It weakened significantly while crossing the country, and MFR discontinued advisories on February 24 after the storm had emerged into the Indian Ocean.

Before Haruna struck Madagascar, a pre-existing system produced deadly flooding, and when the cyclone crossed the country, it added additional rainfall to the region. Flooding was worst in Toliara where a dyke burst, flooding much of the town and leaving residents without water or power. Many villages in southwestern Madagascar lost access to clean water, prompting various international agencies to deploy teams to decontaminate wells. Haruna destroyed 7,402 houses, which left 13,882 people homeless. Most of the displaced people were able to leave their shelters by early April. The cyclone damaged rice and maize crops along the coast, although there were extended residual effects when a locust outbreak occurred, affecting half of Madagascar's farmlands by July 2013. Throughout Madagascar, Haruna killed 26 people and injured 127 directly, and there were outbreaks of various diseases in the storm's aftermath.

== Meteorological history ==
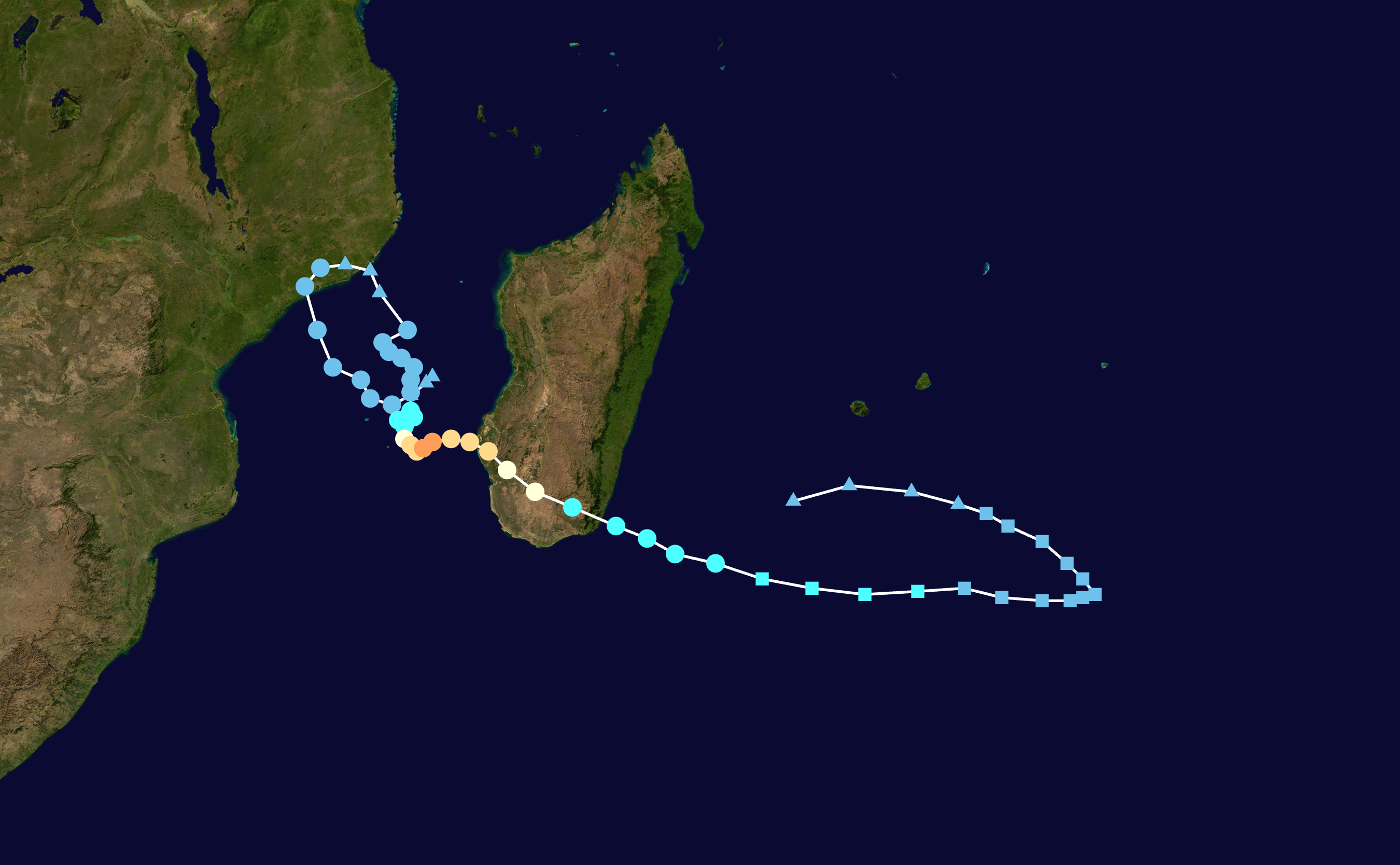
Map plotting the storm's track and intensity, according to the Saffir–Simpson scale Map key Saffir–Simpson scale Tropical depression (≤38 mph, ≤62 km/h) Tropical storm (39–73 mph, 63–118 km/h) Category 1 (74–95 mph, 119–153 km/h) Category 2 (96–110 mph, 154–177 km/h) Category 3 (111–129 mph, 178–208 km/h) Category 4 (130–156 mph, 209–251 km/h) Category 5 (≥157 mph, ≥252 km/h) Unknown Storm type Tropical cyclone Subtropical cyclone Extratropical cyclone, remnant low, tropical disturbance, or monsoon depression

In the middle of February, an area of convection, or thunderstorms, persisted in the Mozambique Channel. It had an associated circulation and rainbands to the east of the center, and was related to the monsoon trough. The system was located within an area of warm sea surface temperatures of over 29 °C (84 °F) and steadily decreasing wind shear. A ridge to the south caused the system to initially track to the north. By February 16, the system had moved over Mozambique and turned to the east, although by that time it had become better organized with the convection wrapping into the center. Subsequently, the system moved southward due to a weakness in the ridge, with conditions favorable for tropical cyclogenesis such as low wind shear and good divergence. On February 18, the Joint Typhoon Warning Center (JTWC) issued a Tropical Cyclone Formation Alert, and at 1200 UTC that day, Météo-France (MFR) initiated advisories on Tropical Disturbance 09.

Upon being classified, the disturbance had a broad circulation that was difficult to locate, with moderate convection in its eastern periphery. The thunderstorms organized further, and MFR upgraded the disturbance to a tropical depression at 0000 UTC on February 19. Three hours later, the JTWC began issuing advisories on Tropical Cyclone 16S, and at 0600 UTC that day, MFR upgraded the depression to a moderate tropical storm after an advanced scatterometer indicated winds of over 65 km/h (40 mph); as a result, the National Weather Service of Madagascar gave it the name Haruna. By that time, the circulation had become better organized with increased rainbands, and with an anticyclone aloft, the storm developed well-defined outflow. The structure of Haruna continued to become more symmetrical with a large radius of maximum winds, developing a ragged eye early on February 20. Based on the improved appearance, MFR upgraded Haruna to a severe tropical storm at 0000 UTC that day. About 12 hours later, the agency upgraded Haruna further to tropical cyclone status, with 10 minute winds of 120 km/h (75 mph). That day, an approaching trough weakened the ridge to the south, causing the cyclone to slow and move erratically. While Haruna was approaching the southwestern coast of Madagascar, it developed a 120 km (75 mi) wide eye, and the eyewall passed over Europa Island. Initially, MFR estimated that the storm would intensify to intense tropical cyclone status, and the agency assessed that Haruna reached 10 minute winds of 150 km/h (95 mph) on February 20. The next day, JTWC estimated peak 1 minute winds of 185 km/h (115 mph). In contrast, MFR estimated at that time that the cyclone had peaked when the eyewall thunderstorms warmed, followed by the eye becoming less organized and the winds decreasing.

While moving slowly to the east-southeast, Haruna re-intensified early on February 22 to its previous MFR peak intensity. At around 0230 UTC that day, the cyclone made landfall about 55 km (35 mi) south of Morombe in southwestern Madagascar. Haruna quickly weakened below cyclone status, and while over land it accelerated to the southeast. On February 23, Haruna weakened to an overland depression with 10 minute winds of around 45 km/h (30 mph). A few hours later, the system emerged into the Indian Ocean near Fort Dauphin as a tropical disturbance. With generally favorable conditions, convection reorganized slightly and the system redeveloped outflow to the south. Early on February 24, Haruna re-intensified into a moderate tropical storm, although soon after it weakened again due to cooler waters, increasing shear, and dry air. At 1200 UTC, MFR issued its last advisory after Haruna began losing tropical characteristics, designating it as a subtropical depression. The next day, the JTWC also discontinued advisories on the storm, noting that Haruna was dissipating about 665 km (415 mi) south-southwest of Réunion.

== Impact and aftermath ==
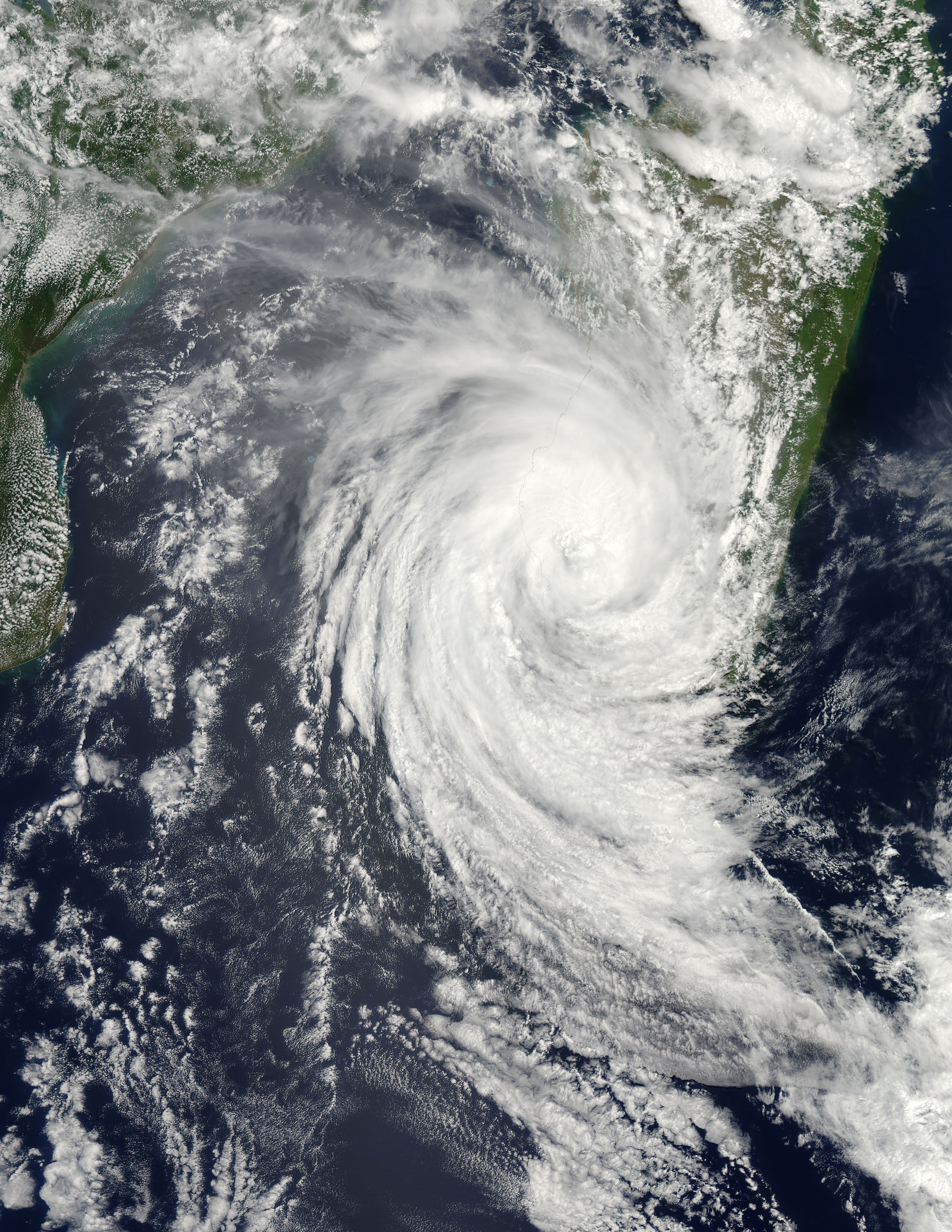
Satellite image of Haruna over southern Madagascar on February 22

On Europa Island in the Mozambique Channel, Haruna produced wind gusts of 144 km/h (90 mph) during the passage of the eyewall. Before the cyclone struck Madagascar, the Intertropical Convergence Zone had caused flooding in the country that killed four people and caused widespread road disruption. Officials prepared by collecting supplies in the capital Antananarivo beginning on February 20, and sending an emergency crew to the expected landfall location. Residents were evacuated using boats and canoes to shelters.

For several days while offshore western Madagascar, Haruna dropped greater than normal rainfall. The storm ultimately made landfall about 15 hours faster than anticipated. Winds and rainfall from Haruna damaged houses and power systems, and also damaged 265 classrooms and 16 health facilities. There was also damage to the rice and maize crops from high winds near the coast, causing food shortages. Rains from the storm caused a dyke along the Fiherenana River to break, which flooded a large region and forced about 6,000 people to evacuate their homes. The flooding from the dyke break was worst in Toliara, where most residents lost access to fresh water and power. Flooding in the city caused the temporarily closure of the airport there. The town of Morombe was temporarily isolated after the road was blocked. Power outages affected Morombe, Toliara, Sakaraha, and Betioky Sud. Downed trees had affected roads near Toliara but were quickly removed. About 1,050 houses were flooded, another 691 lost their roofs, and 7,402 were destroyed, leaving 13,882 people homeless. Overall, Haruna killed 26 people and injured another 127.

There were initial difficulties in distributing aid to areas of southwestern Madagascar due to prevailing unsettled weather, along with fuel shortages. Workers used boats to rescue people in flooded areas. Members of the Madagascar Armed Forces, along with about 200 Red Cross volunteers, assisted in evacuations and aid distribution, and the Red Cross also provided free medical consultations to thousands of people. Following the storm, there were increased levels of malaria, dysentery, and childhood diarrhea in the area around Toliara, and there was a locust outbreak. Increased locust activity persisted into the summer, and had been occurring since late 2012; this caused continued food shortages, and by July the locusts were affecting about half of the country's farmlands. To prevent further spreading of disease, officials provided vaccinations and sprayed insecticide. In isolated villages in southwestern Madagascar, residents faced food shortages, while in some areas, the water supply was contaminated. Within a few weeks of the storms, many residents whose dwellings were not destroyed were able to return to their homes. In Toliara, about 4,000 students were initially unable to return to school due to being displaced. In the middle of March, 1,948 displaced people stayed in a military camp or two schools, but most returned home by early April. Repairs to the dyke in Toliara began in early April, and were expected to take about a month and a half.

On February 23, the prime minister of Madagascar issued an appeal to the international community for assistance. In Toliara, United Nations agencies, including the World Food Programme, and non-governmental organizations worked together to provide food for 3,000 people in six shelters. The World Food Programme sent a truck with 1,050 tons of food to Toliara, including corn and legumes. A few days after Haruna struck, the French Red Cross sent a ship to Toliara with 35 tons of supplies, including for housing and water. The International Federation of Red Cross and Red Crescent Societies authorized funds to help up to 10,000 affected residents. Handicap International provided food and shelter to 547 people in Toliara. Action Against Hunger sent a plane with 15 tons of supplies, including water treatment units, to Madagascar after the storm. By March 20, 1,330 wells were disinfected by various crews. On March 1, the European Commission donated €200,000 for immediate relief. The Red Crescent Society of the United Arab Emirates sent about 80 tonnes of food, medicine, and building supplies to the country.

== See also ==
- Cyclone Fanele – powerful cyclone that struck western Madagascar in 2009
