= January 2016 Argentine locust swarm =

Largest locust swarm for over 60 years in Argentina

In January 2016, Argentina faced the largest locust swarm for over 60 years. Diego Quiroga, Argentina's agriculture agency’s chief of vegetative protection, said that it was impossible to eradicate the swarm, so they focused on minimizing the damage caused by it by sending out fumigators equipped with backpack sprayers to exterminate small pockets of young locusts that are still unable to fly. This method of extermination, however, is unable to wipe out pocket of locusts hidden in Argentina's large, dry forests. The swarm covered an area the size of 1,900 square miles (5,000 km^{2}) in Northern Argentina. The locusts were expected to grow ten inches (25 cm) and mature into flying swarms by 5 February.

The locusts first appeared in small areas in June 2015. The mild winter aided their population growth, allowing the swarm to reach its size. This swarm was reported to be the largest within 60 years despite the previous year's swarm being reported four inches (10 cm) in length and two inches (5 cm) in height. A swarm of this size is worrisome to Argentines because locusts, a type of grasshopper, attack farmers' crops and can cause famine and starvation. This behavior is more pronounced when the locust population density is higher due to a trait called locust phase polyphenism, so it stands to reason that a larger swarm will be more aggressive than a smaller one.

In 2016, there were over one hundred outbreaks of locusts that affected an area of over 700,000 hectares (1,700,000 acres; 7,000 km^{2}). The infestation was so bad that SENASA, the government agricultural inspection agency, set up a hotline for people to call if they see any locusts.
