= Plague! =

Board game

Plague! is a board game first published by B&B Productions in 1991, and was designed by Steven Barsky.

== Description ==
Plague! is about the arrival of the Black Plague in Weymouth, England, in 1348.

== Reception ==
Richard H. Berg comments: "Plague! is not a game to play to see who wins, mostly because it is so chaotic and random at times. It is a game that delightfully highlights the fact that, as with many trips, it's not where you’re going but how you get there."
