= Eugenio Morales Agacino =

Spanish entomologist and naturalist

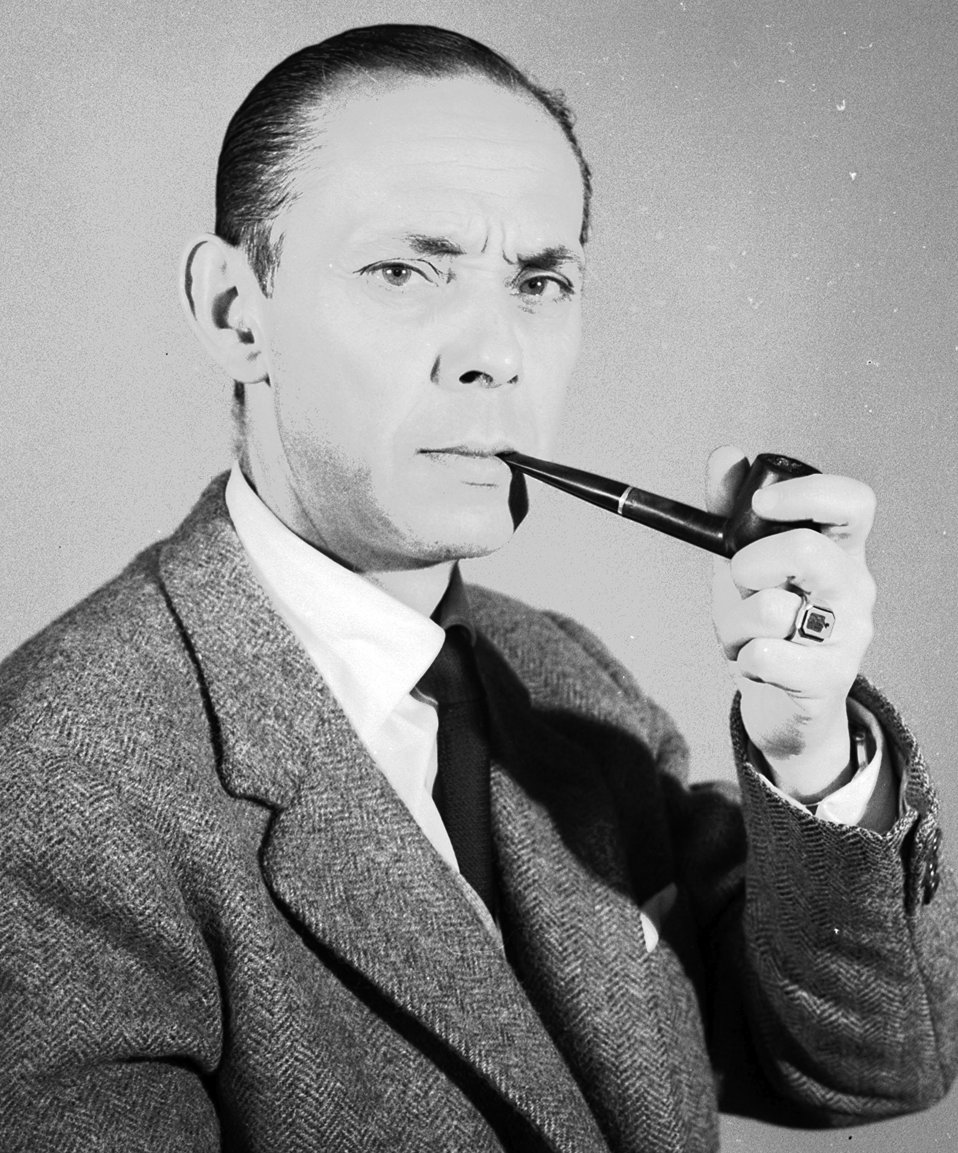
Eugenio Morales Agacino

Eugenio Morales Agacino (March 15, 1914 – March 9, 2002) was a Spanish entomologist and naturalist, named honorary doctorate by the Autonomous University of Madrid.
