= 2003–2005 African locust outbreak =

In 2004, West and North Africa experienced their largest infestation of desert locusts in more than 15 years. A number of countries in the fertile northern regions of Africa were affected.

== Development ==
The increase in Desert Locust breeding activity was noted in the United Nations Food and Agriculture Organization (FAO) Desert Locust Bulletins in the autumn of 2003 when four unrelated outbreaks occurred simultaneously in Mauritania, Mali, Niger and Sudan. Shortly thereafter, unusually heavy rain fell for two days over a large area that extended from Dakar, Senegal to the Atlas Mountains in Morocco. Some areas in Western Sahara received more than 100 mm of rain whereas they normally receive about 1 mm of rain in a year. Consequently, ecological conditions remained favourable for at least six months and allowed several successive generations of Desert Locust breeding. In such circumstances, locusts increased very rapidly. By early 2004, the threat materialized as swarms of locusts started to form and move north into important agricultural areas in Morocco and Algeria, inflicting damage to crops. The collective fear, expressed by the FAO and news organizations covering the situation, was the potential destruction of a sizable portion of Africa's food supply if control operations could not be mounted quickly and successfully.

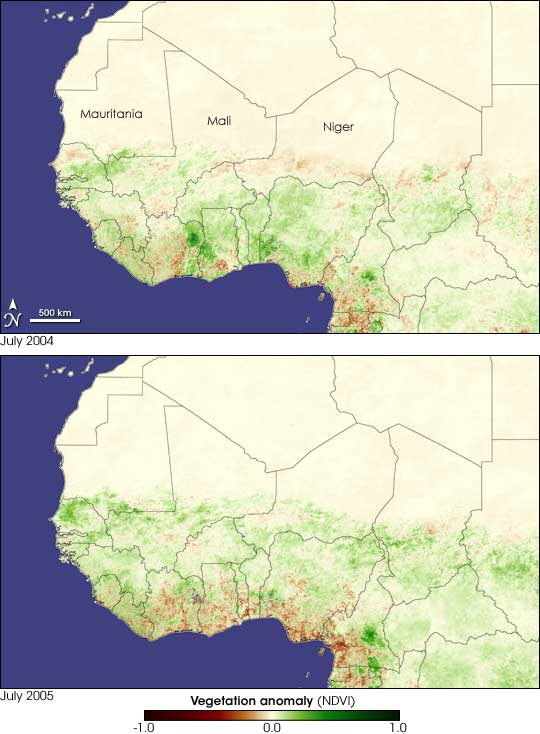
Satellite imagery of western Africa detailing the vegetation affected by locusts and drought in 2004 and 2005, respectively.

During the summer of 2004, large numbers of swarms from Northwest Africa invaded the Sahel in West Africa and quickly moved into crops. By then, the threat of a locust plague emerged, creating one of the most dangerous locust situations since 1989. As the year progressed, the swarms migrated over the continent causing devastation, and in November 2004 appeared in northern Egypt, Jordan and Israel for the first time in 50 years. One swarm in Morocco between Tarfaya and Tan-Tan was 230 km long, at least 150 m wide, and contained an estimated 69 billion locusts, which were being used as a food resource by 33 species of birds (Ullman 2006). Swarms also invaded Cape Verde, the Canary Islands, southern Portugal, and Crete. Lack of rain and cold temperatures in the winter breeding area of Northwest Africa slowed down the development of the locusts and allowed the locust control agencies to stop the cycle in early 2005.

National teams in some 20 countries treated nearly 130,000 square kilometres by air and ground. The costs of fighting this upsurge have been estimated by the FAO to have exceeded US$400 million and harvest losses were valued at up to US$2.5 billion which had disastrous effects on the food security situation in West Africa. However a combination of strict pest control measures and a good harvest allowed Africa to avoid a continent-wide food disaster. According to the FAO, while the overall food output for the affected Sahel region has declined, it is still within the range of five-year averages. Nevertheless, some countries lost significant portions of their crops to the locusts, particularly Mauritania, which lost as much as half of its harvest.

The outbreak inspired several works of literature. In March 2007, Andersen Press published Sophie and the Locust Curse, a novel by British children's author Stephen Davies about the devastating impact of the 2004 locust swarm on communities in the Sahel region of Burkina Faso.

== See also ==
- List of locust swarms
