= List of rodent plagues =

A number of instances of acute overpopulation among rodents have been characterized as rodent plagues, including:

- Mouse plagues in Australia, documented since 1871
- Mautam, a recurring rat plague (also called a rat flood) in India and Myanmar
- 2007 vole plague in Castile and León

== See also ==
- List of locust swarms
