= Plac =

Plac may refer to:

- Pro-Life Amendment Campaign (PLAC), anti-abortion campaigners in Ireland, 1983
- Plač, village in northeastern Slovenia
- Plac, Polish for town square, see List of city squares#Poland
- Pyramidalis–anterior pubic ligament–adductor longus complex (PLAC), anatomical concept in sports medicine.

== See also ==
- Klonownica-Plac, a village in eastern Poland
- Kotowo-Plac, a village in north-eastern Poland
