= Galinthias philbyi =

Scientific classification
- Kingdom: Animalia
- Phylum: Arthropoda
- Clade: Pancrustacea
- Class: Insecta
- Order: Mantodea
- Family: Galinthiadidae
- Genus: Galinthias
- Species: G. philbyi

Binomial name
- Galinthias philbyi Uvarov, 1936

Synonyms
- Attalia philbyi Uvarov, 1936

Species of praying mantis

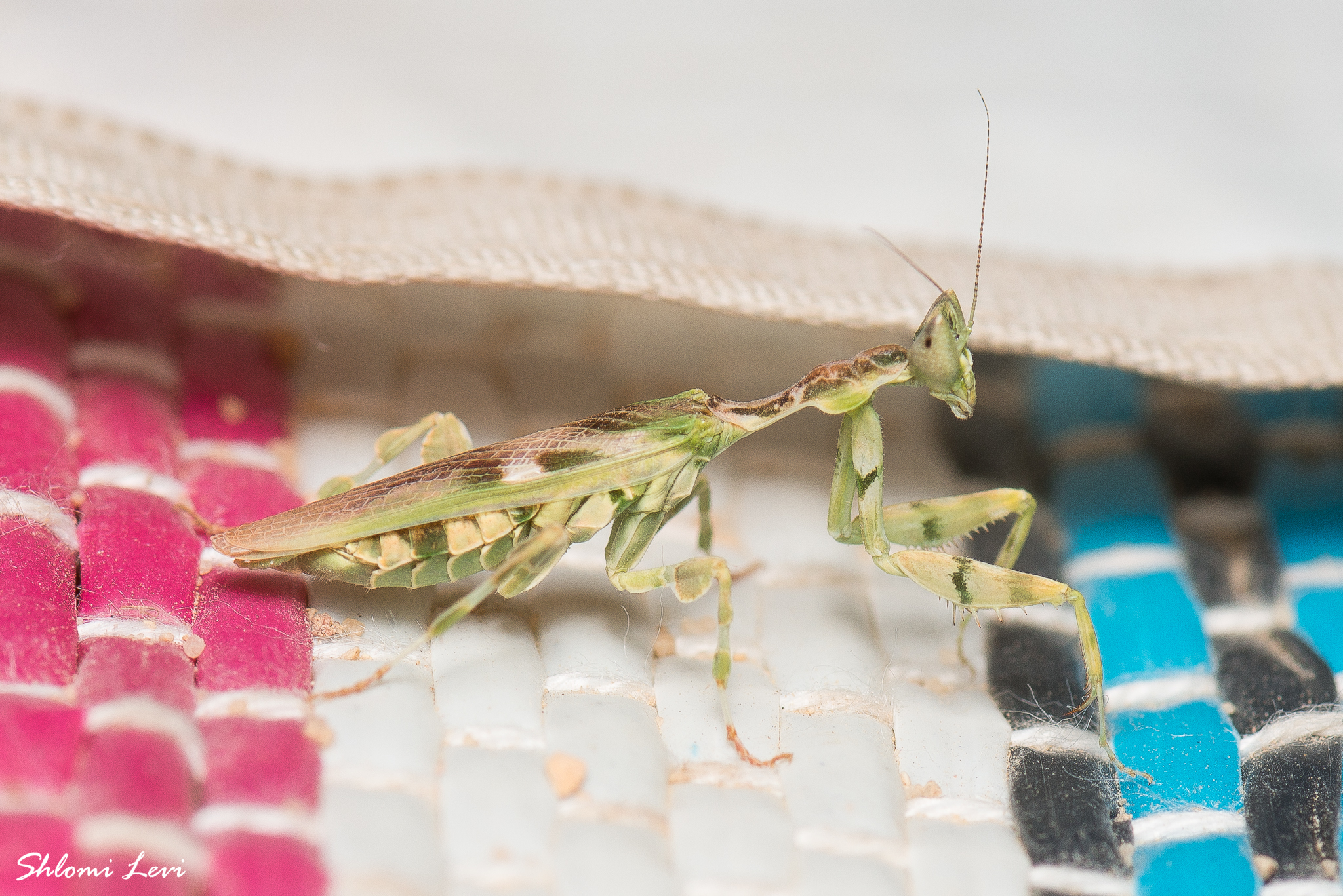
Galinthias philbyi female

Galinthias philbyi, common name Yemen mantis, is a species of praying mantis native to Yemen and Saudi Arabia.

== See also ==
- List of mantis genera and species
