= Galinthias amoena =

Scientific classification
- Kingdom: Animalia
- Phylum: Arthropoda
- Clade: Pancrustacea
- Class: Insecta
- Order: Mantodea
- Family: Galinthiadidae
- Genus: Galinthias
- Species: G. amoena

Binomial name
- Galinthias amoena Saussure, 1871

Synonyms
- Galinthias hyalina Saussure, 1899; Galinthias usambarica Sjostedt, 1909

Species of praying mantis

Galinthias amoena is a species of praying mantis found in sub-Saharan Africa.

== See also ==
- List of mantis genera and species
