= Galinthias occidentalis =

Scientific classification
- Kingdom: Animalia
- Phylum: Arthropoda
- Clade: Pancrustacea
- Class: Insecta
- Order: Mantodea
- Family: Galinthiadidae
- Genus: Galinthias
- Species: G. occidentalis

Binomial name
- Galinthias occidentalis Beier, 1930

Species of praying mantis

Galinthias occidentalis is a species of praying mantis native to western Africa.

It is found in Ghana, Guinea, Cameroon, Ivory Coast−Côte d'Ivoire, and Sierra Leone.

== See also ==
- List of mantis genera and species
- Mantises of Africa
