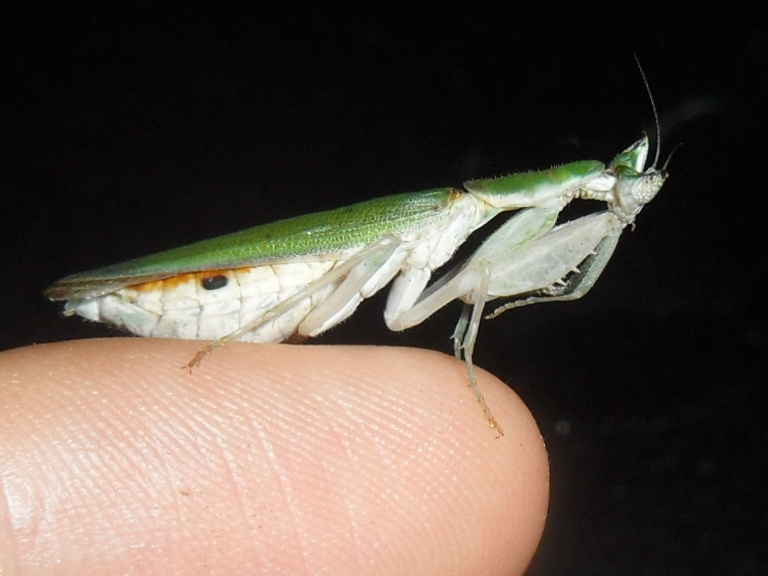
- Adult female Pseudoharpax virescens on a finger

Scientific classification
- Kingdom: Animalia
- Phylum: Arthropoda
- Clade: Pancrustacea
- Class: Insecta
- Order: Mantodea
- Family: Galinthiadidae
- Genus: Pseudoharpax
- Species: P. virescens

Binomial name
- Pseudoharpax virescens (Serville, 1839)

Subspecies
- See text

Synonyms
- Harpax (Creobroter) virescens Serville, 1839

= Pseudoharpax virescens =

Gambian spotted-eye flower mantis

Species of praying mantis

Pseudoharpax virescens, common name Gambian spotted-eye flower mantis, is a species of praying mantis native to western, central and eastern Africa. It takes its name from two eye spots on the dorsal side of the abdomen of adult females.

== Description ==
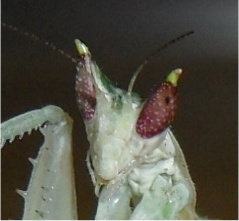
Nighttime eyes

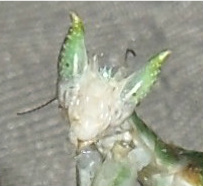
Daytime eyes

Pseudoharpax virescens mimic flowers. They are mostly white with green wings and have pointy eyes. Pseudoharpax virescens are small for a mantis, around 3 centimeters in length as adults. 1st instar nymphs are almost 4 millimeters in length. The color of Pseudoharpax virescens eyes change night to day. At night their eyes are dark red, during the day their eyes are light green. Oothecae can be 5 millimeters to 15 millimeters long.

=== Sexual dimorphism ===
Females are usually about 28 millimeters in length, while males are usually about 25 millimeters. Females have short antennae, while males have long and red antennae. Females are bulkier than males. Eight segments can be counted on the underside of the abdomen of a male and six on that of the female. Females have two dots on their abdomens as adults, while males, whose abdomens are thin and covered completely by their wings when looked at from above, appear to have none.

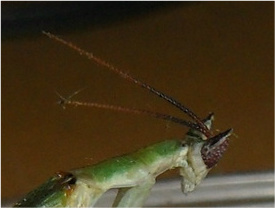
Adult male Pseudoharpax virescens have long and red antennae

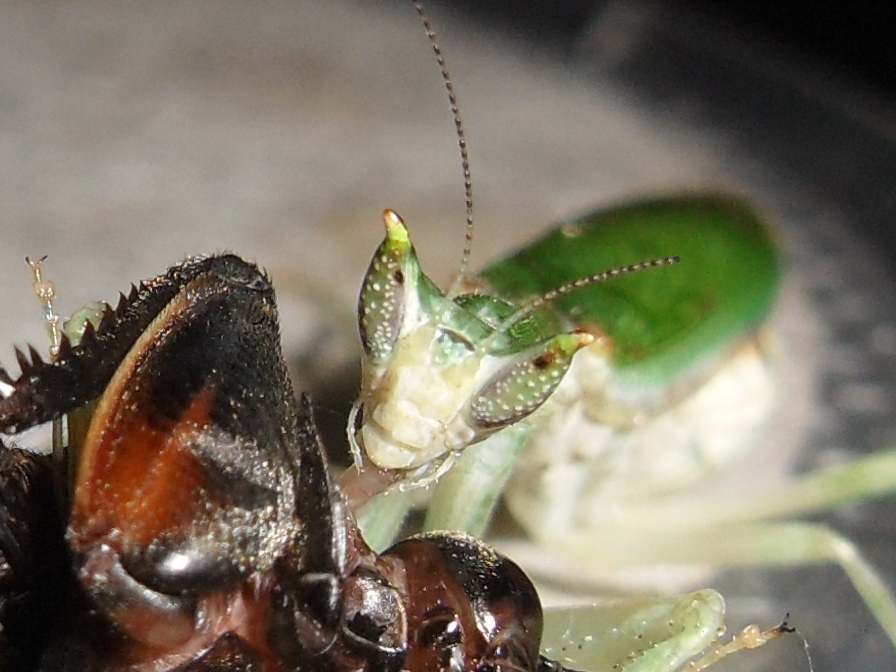
Adult female Pseudoharpax virescens have short antennae. This female has one broken antenna.

== Subspecies ==
There are two subspecies in this species.

- P. v. centralis (La Greca, 1954) - found in central and eastern Africa
- P. v. virescens (Serville, 1839) - found in western and central Africa

== See also ==
- List of mantis genera and species
- Flower mantis
