= Galinthias meruensis =

Scientific classification
- Kingdom: Animalia
- Phylum: Arthropoda
- Clade: Pancrustacea
- Class: Insecta
- Order: Mantodea
- Family: Galinthiadidae
- Genus: Galinthias
- Species: G. meruensis

Binomial name
- Galinthias meruensis Sjöstedt, 1909

Species of praying mantis

Galinthias meruensis is a species of praying mantis found in Kenya, Malawi, Somalia, and Tanzania.

== See also ==
- List of mantis genera and species
