= Congoharpax judithae =

Scientific classification
- Domain: Eukaryota
- Kingdom: Animalia
- Phylum: Arthropoda
- Class: Insecta
- Order: Mantodea
- Family: Galinthiadidae
- Genus: Congoharpax
- Species: C. judithae

Binomial name
- Congoharpax judithae Roy, 1972

Species of praying mantis

Congoharpax judithae is a species of praying mantis in the family Galinthiadidae.

== See also ==
- List of mantis genera and species
