= Congoharpax =

Scientific classification
- Domain: Eukaryota
- Kingdom: Animalia
- Phylum: Arthropoda
- Class: Insecta
- Order: Mantodea
- Family: Galinthiadidae
- Genus: Congoharpax; La Greca, 1954

Genus of praying mantises

Congoharpax is a genus of praying mantis in the family Galinthiadidae. The following species are recognised:

- Congoharpax aberrans
- Congoharpax boulardi
- Congoharpax coiffaiti
- Congoharpax judithae

== See also ==
- List of mantis genera and species
