= Galinthias =

- Galinthias amoena

Scientific classification
- Kingdom: Animalia
- Phylum: Arthropoda
- Clade: Pancrustacea
- Class: Insecta
- Order: Mantodea
- Family: Galinthiadidae
- Genus: Galinthias; Stål, 1877

Synonyms
- Arabistania Kocak & Kemal, 2008; Attalia Uvarov, 1936

Genus of praying mantises

Galinthias is an African genus of praying mantises (order Mantodea); it is the type genus for the new family Galinthiadidae.

== Species ==
- Galinthias amoena
- Galinthias meruensis
- Galinthias occidentalis
- Galinthias philbyi
- Galinthias rhomboidalis

== See also ==
- List of mantis genera and species
