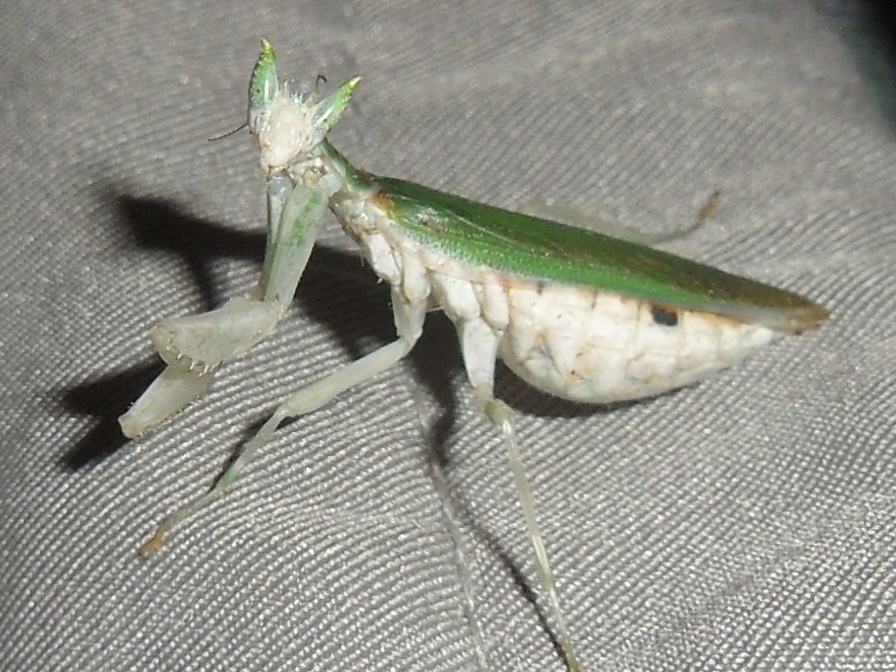
- Pseudoharpax virescens (adult female)

Scientific classification
- Kingdom: Animalia
- Phylum: Arthropoda
- Clade: Pancrustacea
- Class: Insecta
- Order: Mantodea
- Family: Galinthiadidae
- Genus: Pseudoharpax; Saussure, 1870

Synonyms
- Harpagites

= Pseudoharpax =

Genus of praying mantises

Pseudoharpax is a genus of African praying mantids in the family Galinthiadidae.

== Species ==
The Mantodea Species File lists:

1. Pseudoharpax abyssinicus Beier, 1930
2. Pseudoharpax beieri La Greca, 1950
3. Pseudoharpax crenaticollis La Greca, 1954
4. Pseudoharpax dubius La Greca, 1954
5. Pseudoharpax erythraeus Giglio-Tos, 1915
6. Pseudoharpax francoisi Bolivar, 1908
7. Pseudoharpax nigericus Giglio-Tos, 1915
8. Pseudoharpax parallelus La Greca, 1954
9. Pseudoharpax ugandanus Giglio-Tos, 1915
10. Pseudoharpax virescens Serville, 1839 - type species (P. virescens virescens)

== Gallery ==
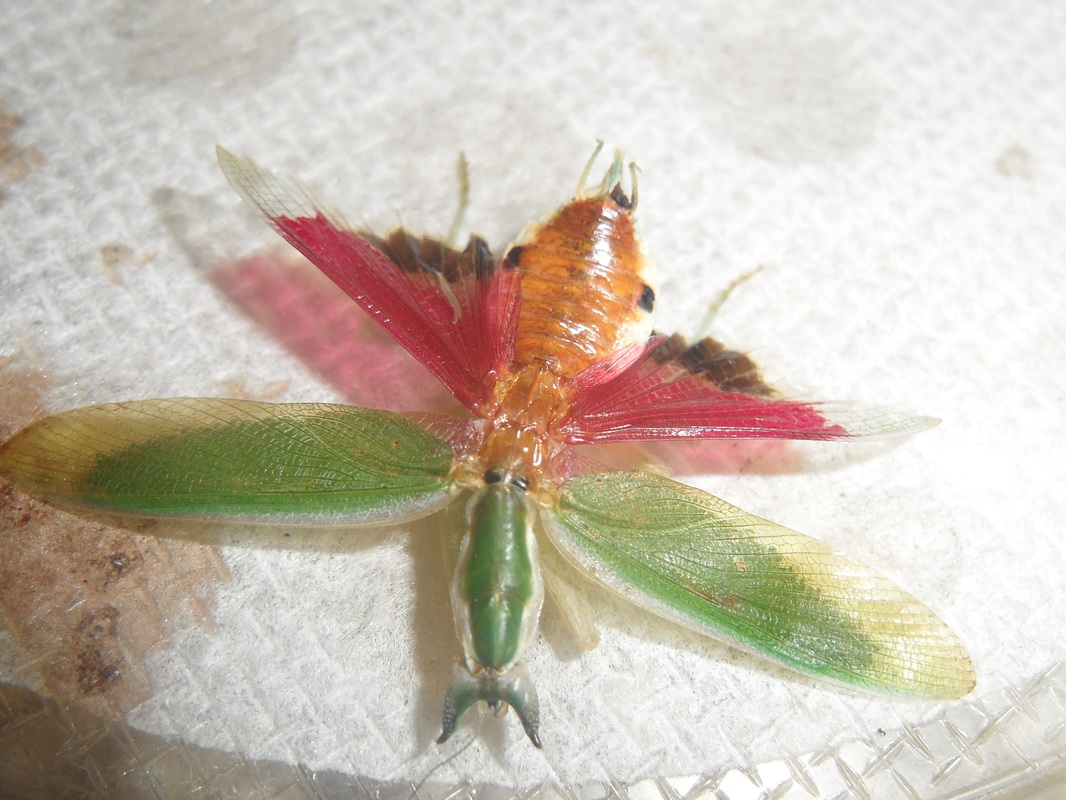
Dead adult female Pseudoharpax virescens

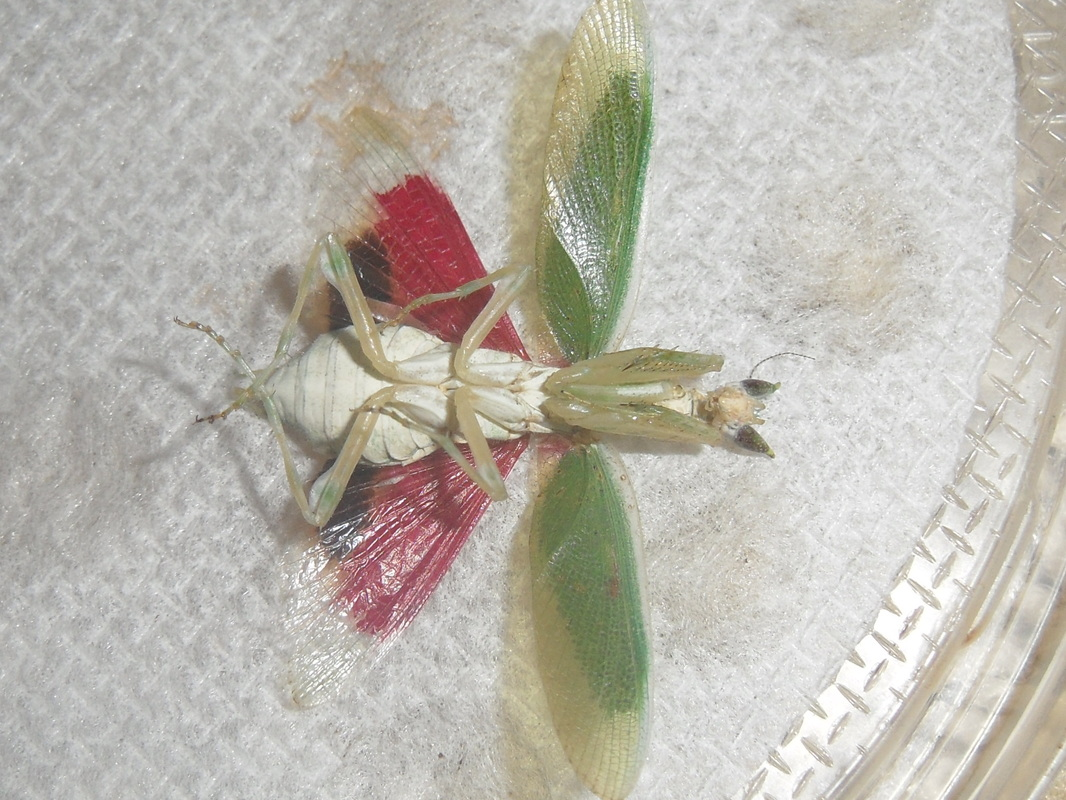
Dead adult female P. virescens

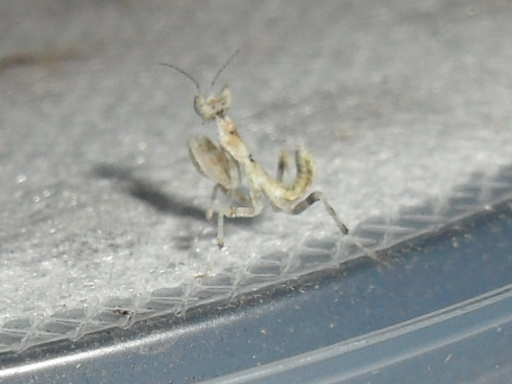
P. virescens nymph, probably in the second-instar stage

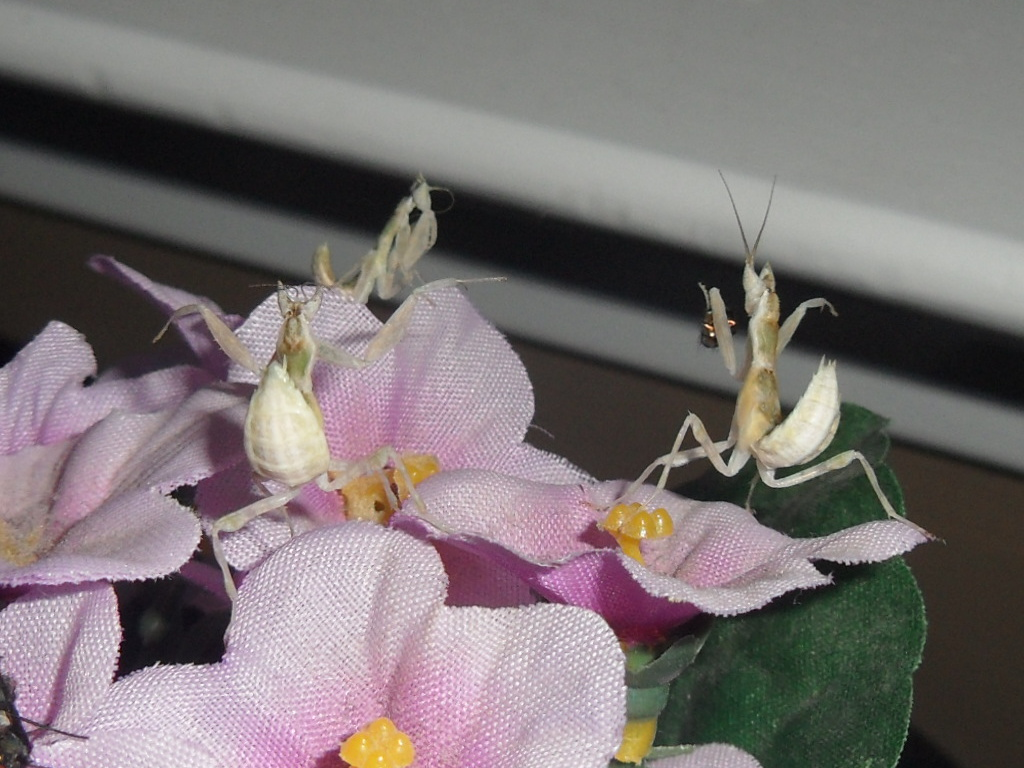
P. virescens nymphs threatening each other, in the older nymphal stages, probably subadult

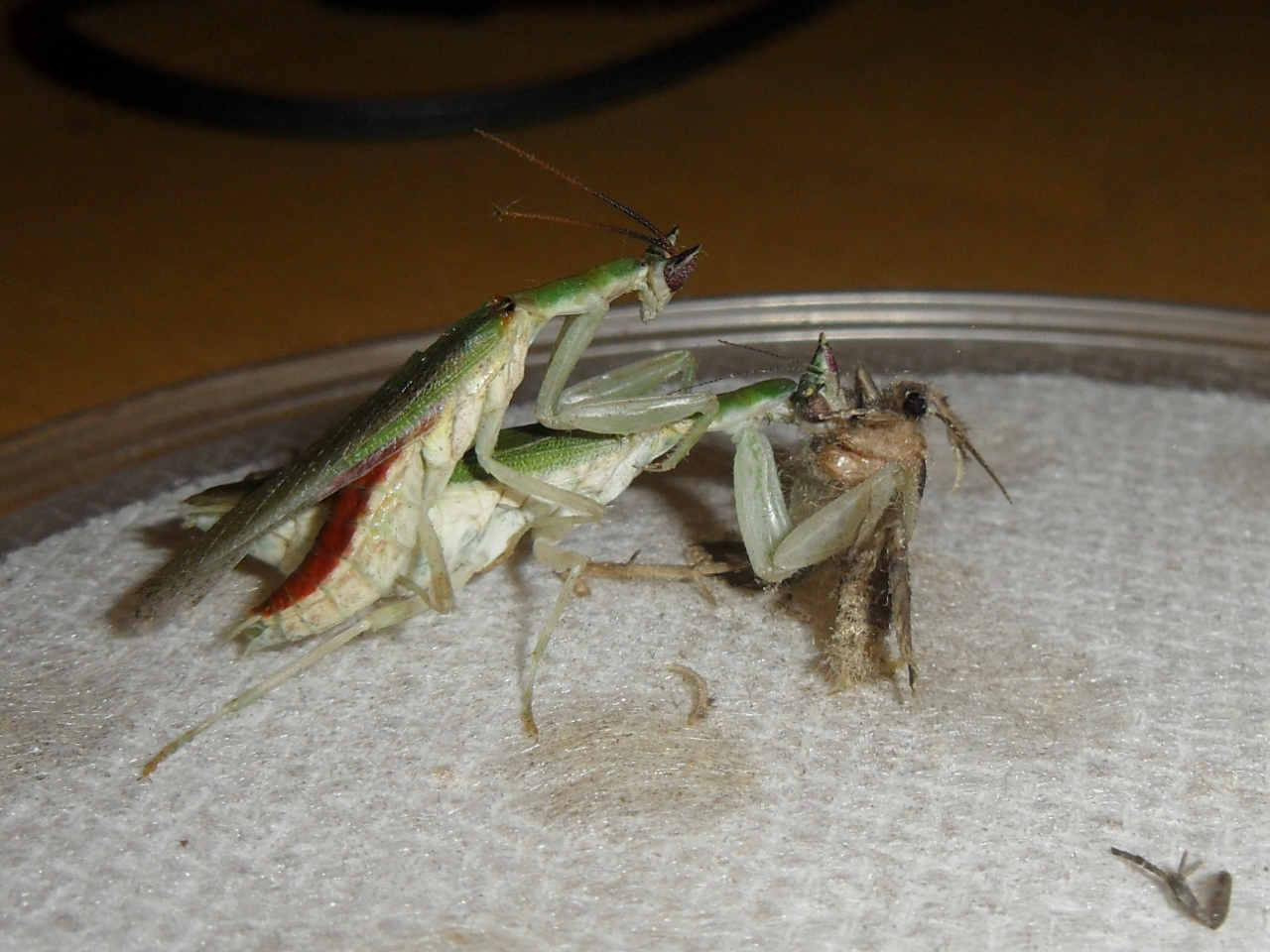
Mating pair of P. virescens

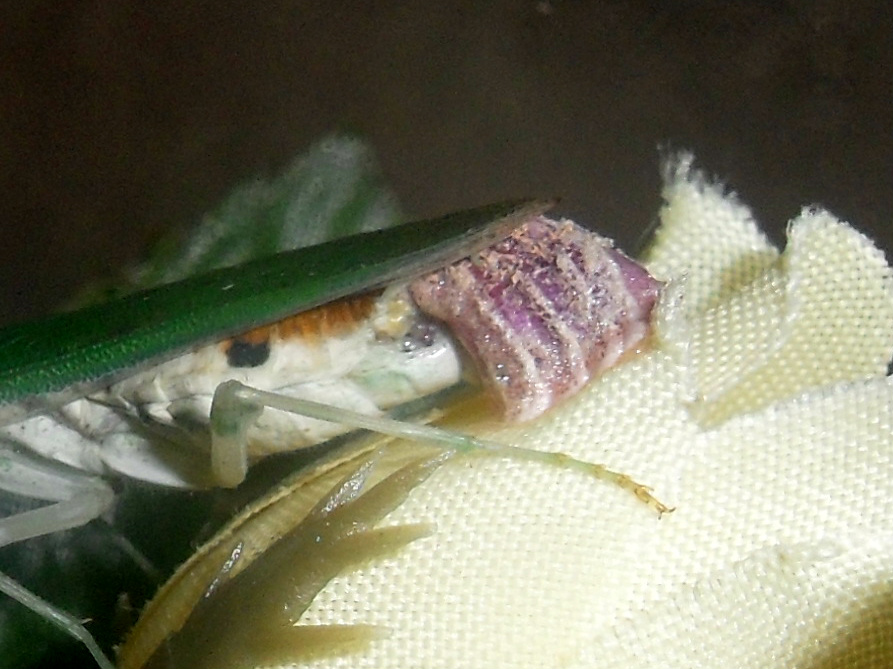
Adult female P. virescens laying an ootheca

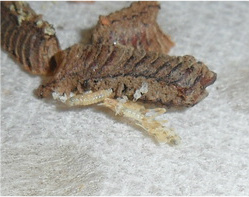
P. virescens hatching

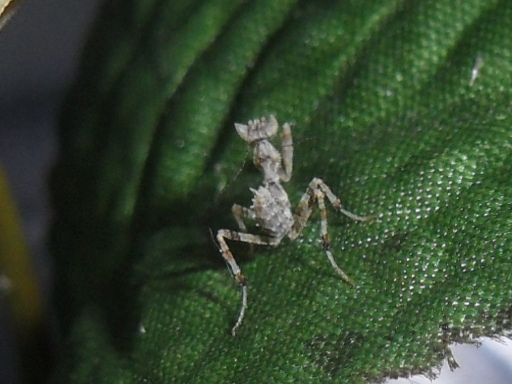
First instar P. virescens nymph
