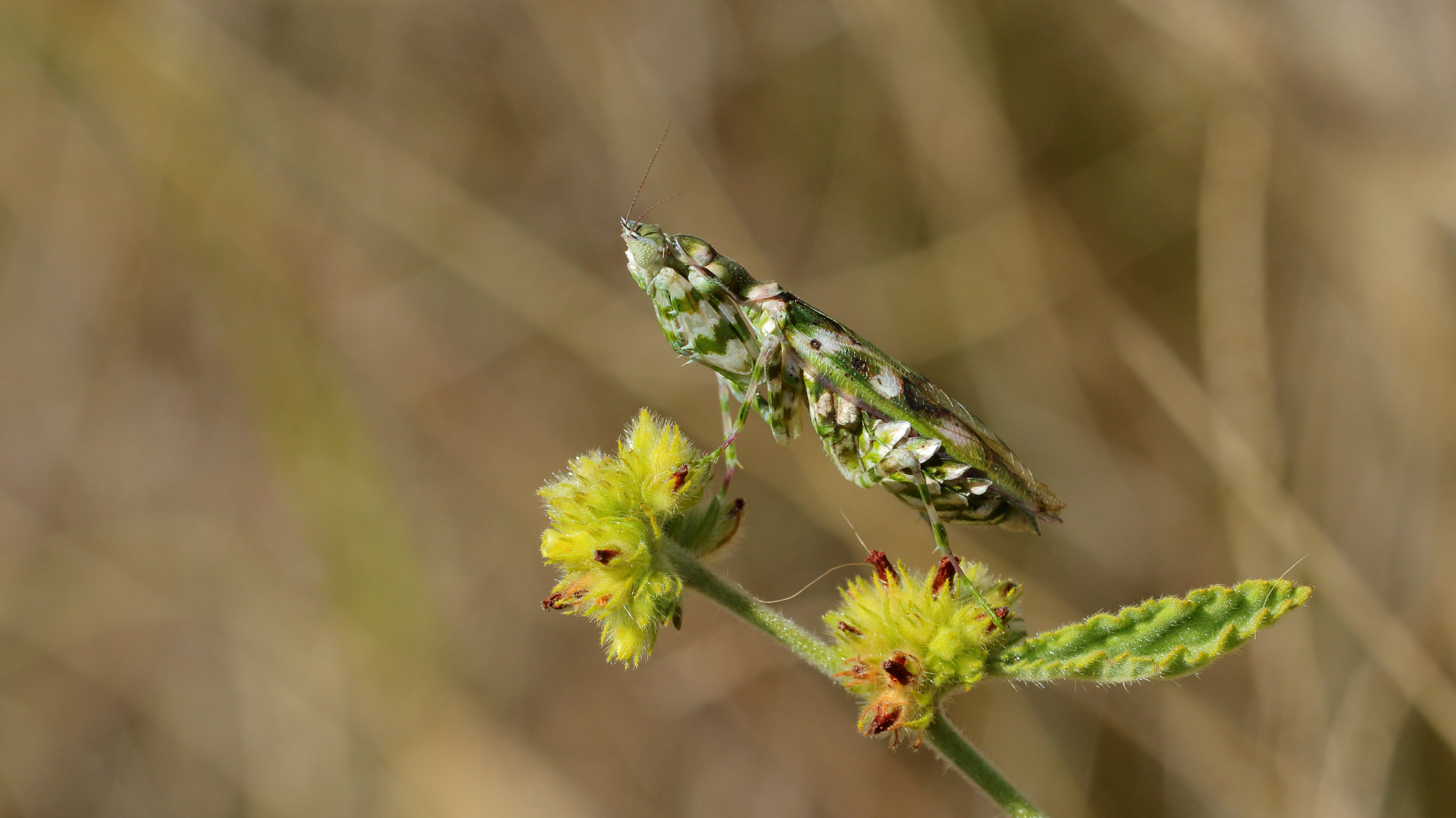
- Harpagomantis tricolor

Scientific classification
- Kingdom: Animalia
- Phylum: Arthropoda
- Clade: Pancrustacea
- Class: Insecta
- Order: Mantodea
- Superfamily: Galinthiadoidea; Giglio-Tos, 1919
- Family: Galinthiadidae; Giglio-Tos, 1919

= Galinthiadidae =

Family of praying mantises

Galinthiadidae is a family of 24 African mantis species (order Mantodea) in four genera.

== Taxonomy ==
Genera:

- Congoharpax
- Galinthias
- Harpagomantis
- Pseudoharpax

== See also ==
- List of mantis genera and species
- Flower mantis
