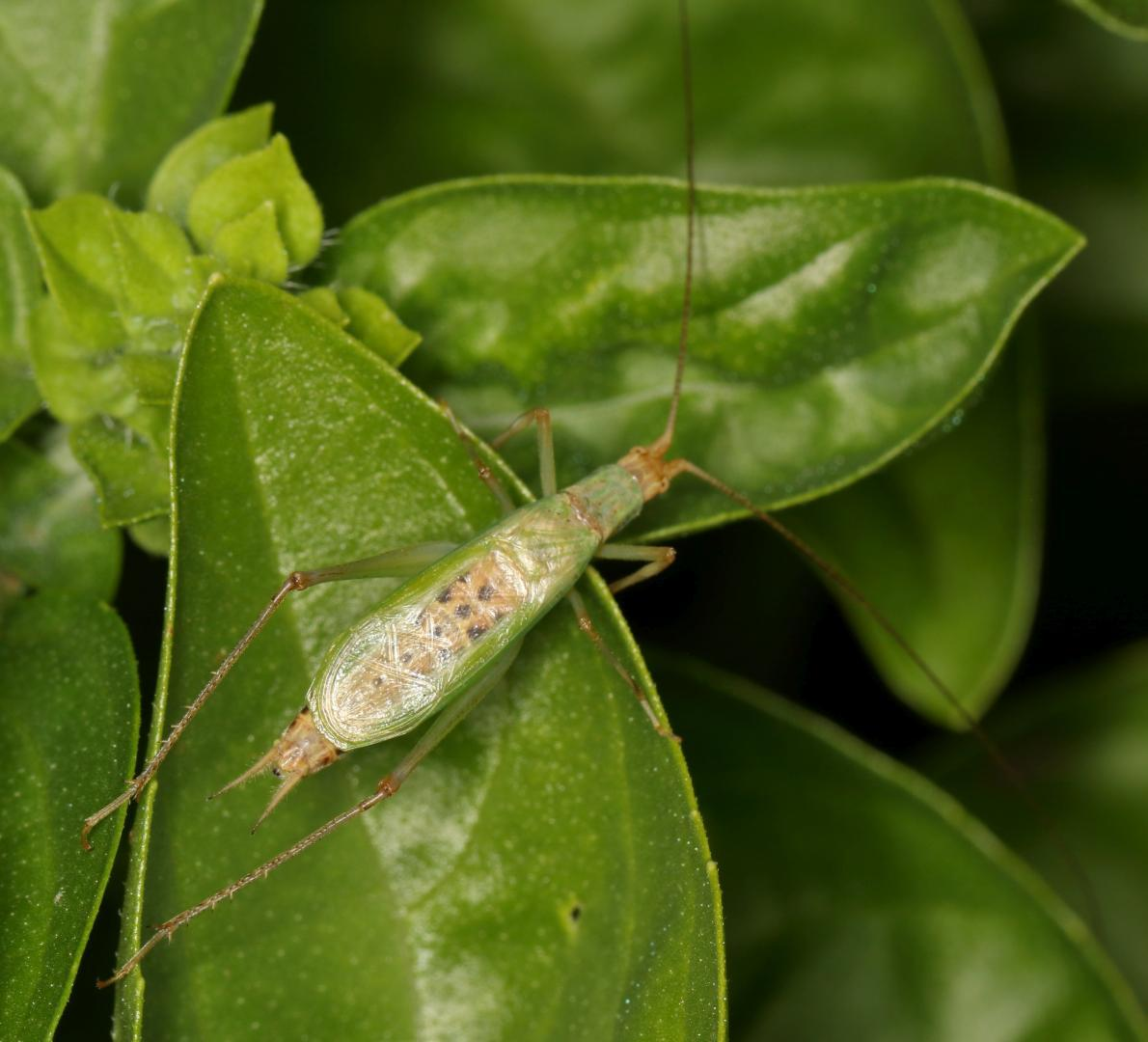

Scientific classification
- Domain: Eukaryota
- Kingdom: Animalia
- Phylum: Arthropoda
- Class: Insecta
- Order: Orthoptera
- Suborder: Ensifera
- Family: Oecanthidae
- Genus: Oecanthus
- Species: O. capensis

Binomial name
- Oecanthus capensis Saussure, 1878

= Oecanthus capensis =

Cape thermometer cricket

Species of tree cricket

Oecanthus capensis, the Cape thermometer cricket, is a species of tree cricket (Subfamily Oecanthinae). It has been found that the rate at which these crickets chirp does NOT follow Dolbear's law. In this species the temperature in C can be calculated by counting the number of chirps in 3 seconds and adding 11

== Description ==
Similar to Oecanthus pellucens, but a little smaller; the wings shorter, elytra of the female slightly stronger, male elytra shorter. The female's ovipositor is nearly the length of elytra.

== Range ==
Southern, eastern and central South Africa.

== Etymology ==
Cape; capensis - after the Cape of Good Hope.
Thermometer cricket - The rate at which these crickets chirp can be used to the estimate the temperature.
