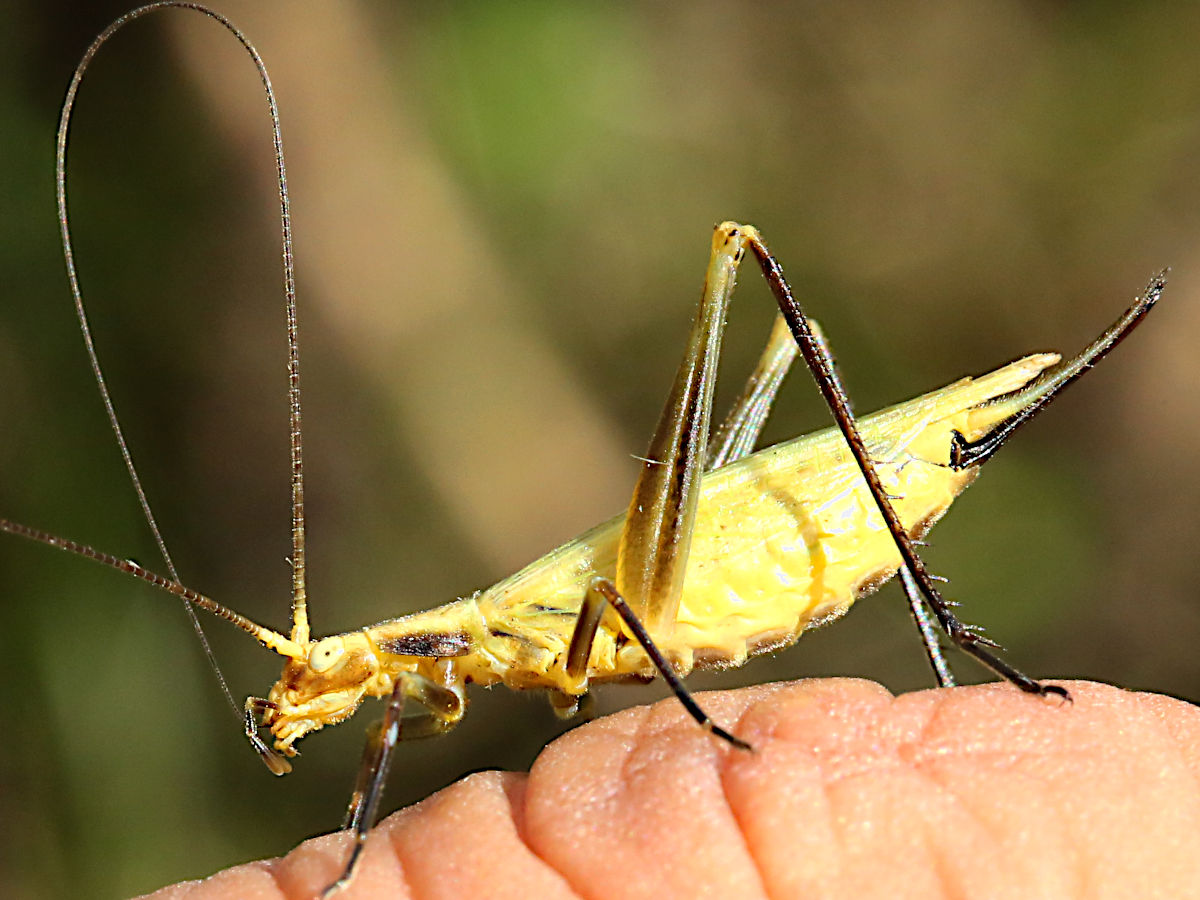
- Female
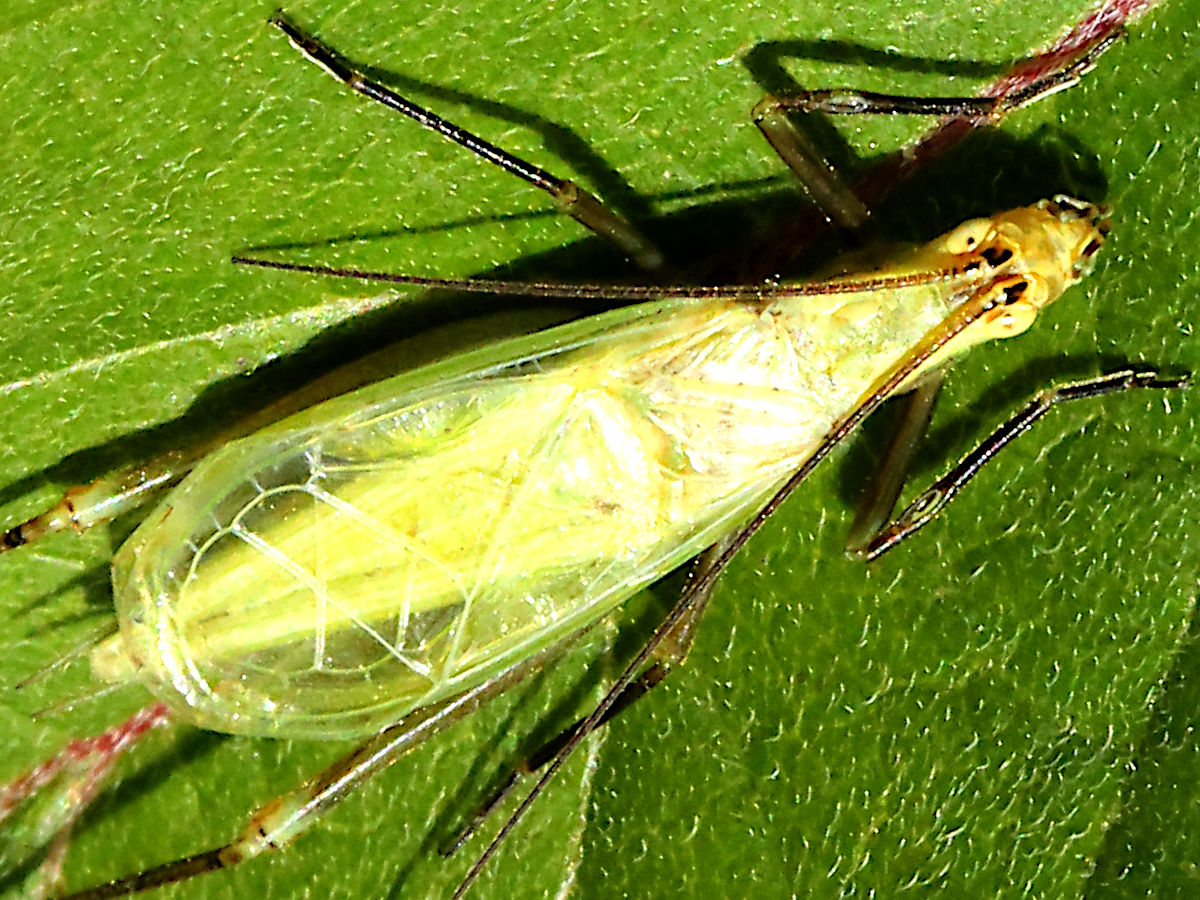
- Male

Scientific classification
- Kingdom: Animalia
- Phylum: Arthropoda
- Clade: Pancrustacea
- Class: Insecta
- Order: Orthoptera
- Suborder: Ensifera
- Family: Oecanthidae
- Genus: Oecanthus
- Species: O. forbesi

Binomial name
- Oecanthus forbesi Titus, 1903

= Oecanthus forbesi =

Species of insect

Oecanthus forbesi, the Forbes' tree cricket, is a species of tree cricket in the family Oecanthidae. It is found in North America.

== Description ==
This species has a yellowish head with black markings on the first two antennal segments.

O. forbesi is very similar to O. nigricornis. The two species can be reliably separated only by the pulses per second (p/sec) of the male's song.

The male sings by stridulation, and the p/sec increases with temperature. The song of the male below was measured at 55-56 p/sec in temperature of about 15 degrees Celsius (°C).

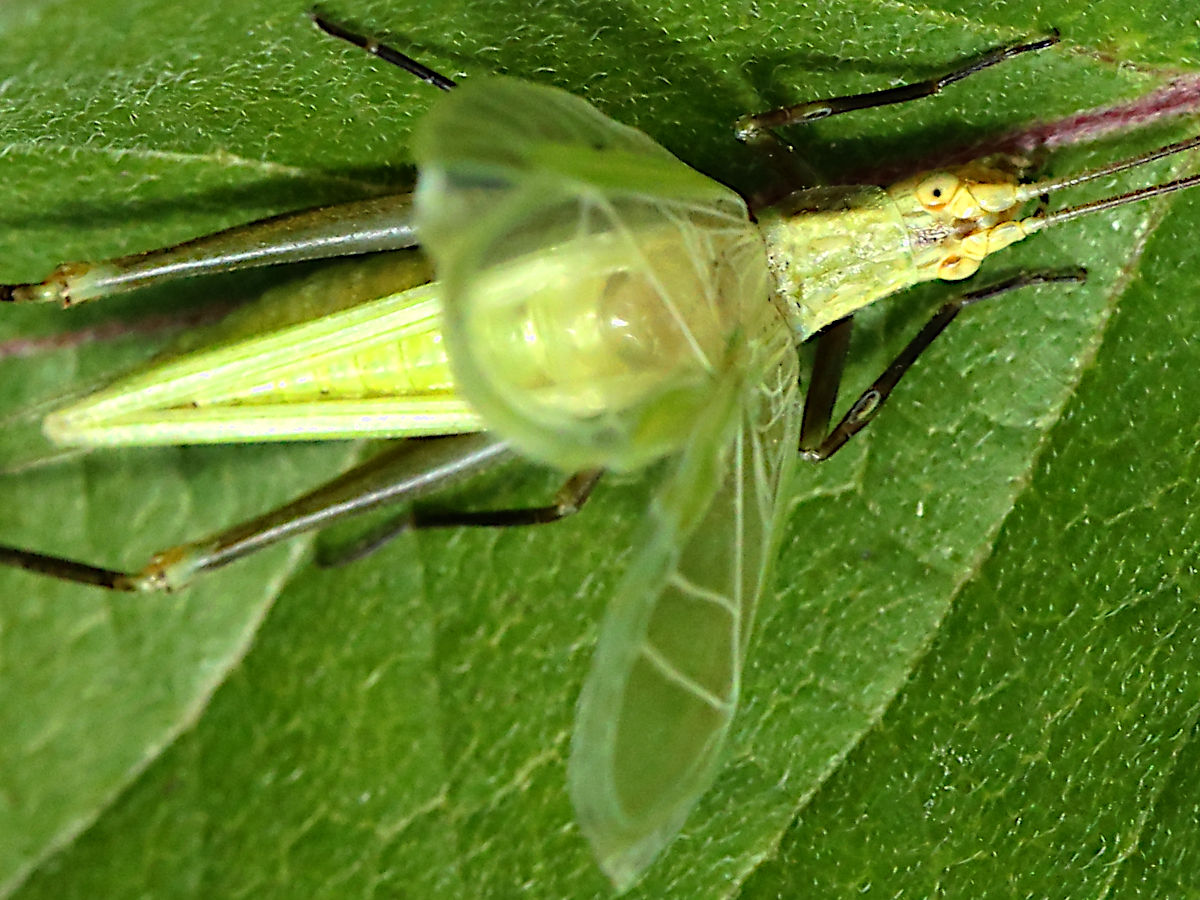
Photo of male stridulating

Video of male stridulating

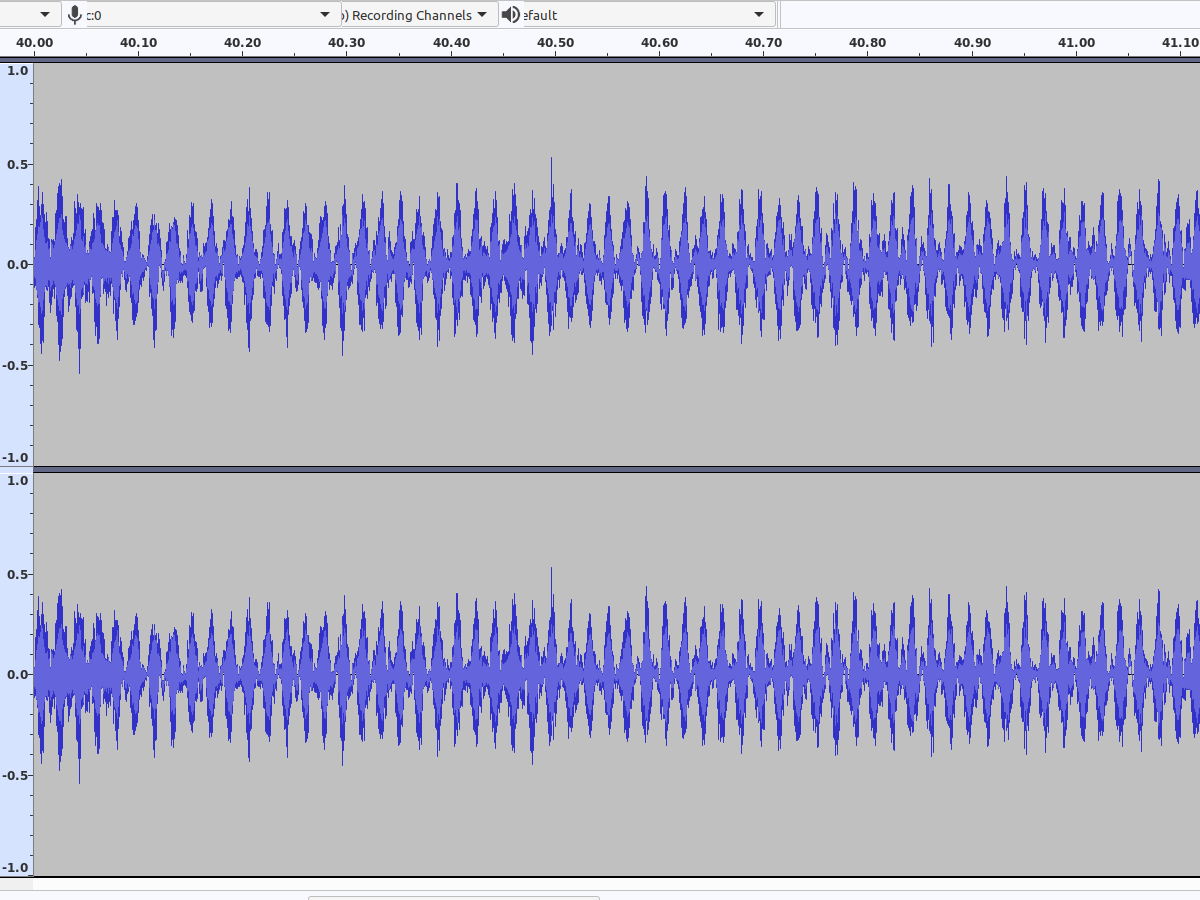
Sonograph of male stridulating
