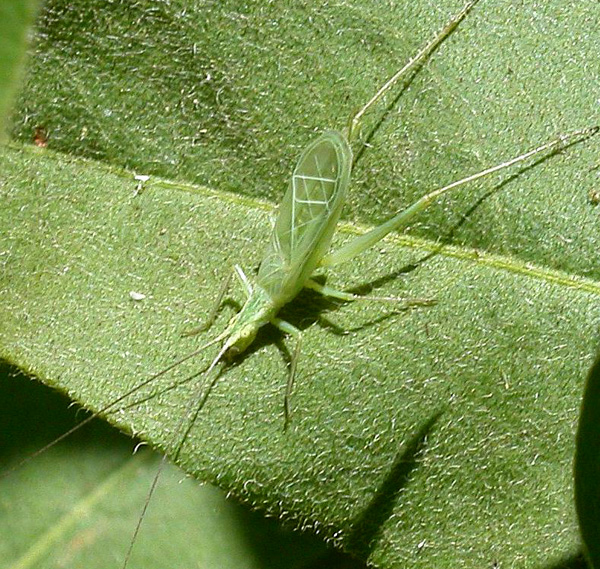

Scientific classification
- Domain: Eukaryota
- Kingdom: Animalia
- Phylum: Arthropoda
- Class: Insecta
- Order: Orthoptera
- Suborder: Ensifera
- Family: Oecanthidae
- Genus: Oecanthus
- Species: O. fultoni

Binomial name
- Oecanthus fultoni T. Walker, 1962

= Oecanthus fultoni =

Species of cricket

Oecanthus fultoni, also known as the snowy tree cricket, or thermometer cricket, is a species of tree cricket from North America. It feeds on leaves but also damages fruit. The chirp of this species is often dubbed onto sound tracks of films and television shows to depict a quiet summer's night. The rate of chirp varies depending on the heat of the environment, allowing a listener to estimate the temperature.

== Etymology ==
Oecanthus fultoni's common name of the thermometer cricket is derived from a relationship between the rate of its chirps and the temperature. An estimate of the temperature in Fahrenheit can be made by adding 40 to the number of chirps made in 15 seconds. Before 1960, the name Oecanthus niveus was wrongly applied to this species. Oecanthus fultoni was named in honor of Bentley Ball Fulton (1880–1960), an American entomologist who laid the principal groundwork on North American cricket classification.

== Description ==
The species is 15–18 mm (0.6–0.7 in) long and is light green with translucent light green wings. It has black marks on the first and second antennal segments, that are either round or oval shaped, and is about half the length of a segment. The antennae are longer than its body and it has a small head. The 3mm eggs are pale yellow and shaped like a kidney. Its nymphs are pale and slender with wings that are not completely developed. The nymphs develop wings slowly. It has one generation per year.

Oecanthus fultoni was for a long time confused with Oecanthus niveus described by entomologist Charles De Geer in 1773. However, in 1962 entomologist Thomas J. Walker found it to be a different species. In the far west of the United States, the species has been thought to be Oecanthus rileyi which is a region where both species are sympatric. Both O. fultoni and O. rileyi are the only two Oecanthus species within the United States that have a regular chirp, but they both have a different chirp rate per minute and O. rileyi is the loudest. In the west of the Great Plains, the species chirps faster. Only the males chirp and they often do so as a group.

American novelist Nathaniel Hawthorne said of the species' chirps, "If moonlight could be heard, it would sound just like that." Producers of films and television shows have often dubbed the chirps on sound tracks to let the viewers know that what is on screen is happening on a quiet summer's night.

== Habitat ==
The species can be found throughout the United States except the southeastern part of the country. It is located in shrubs, vines, fruit trees, broadleaved trees, and oaks. The cricket can rarely be found in grass. Adults of the species can be found from mid-July to mid-November. The cricket can sometimes be so high in oak trees that its chirp is the only way to identify it.

== Feeding ==
Both nymphs and adults feed on leaves and their feeding causes barely any damage. The cricket is known to destroy apples, plums, peaches, and cherries. The female drills a hole into a twig's cambium to lay its egg in. It then makes a row of punctures on one side of the hole and seals it with either excrement or chewed plant tissue once the egg is placed. Adults of the species eat holes in ripe fruits which results in the fruit rotting. It normally does not cause any damage in orchards that are consistently sprayed.

== See also ==
- Dolbear's law
