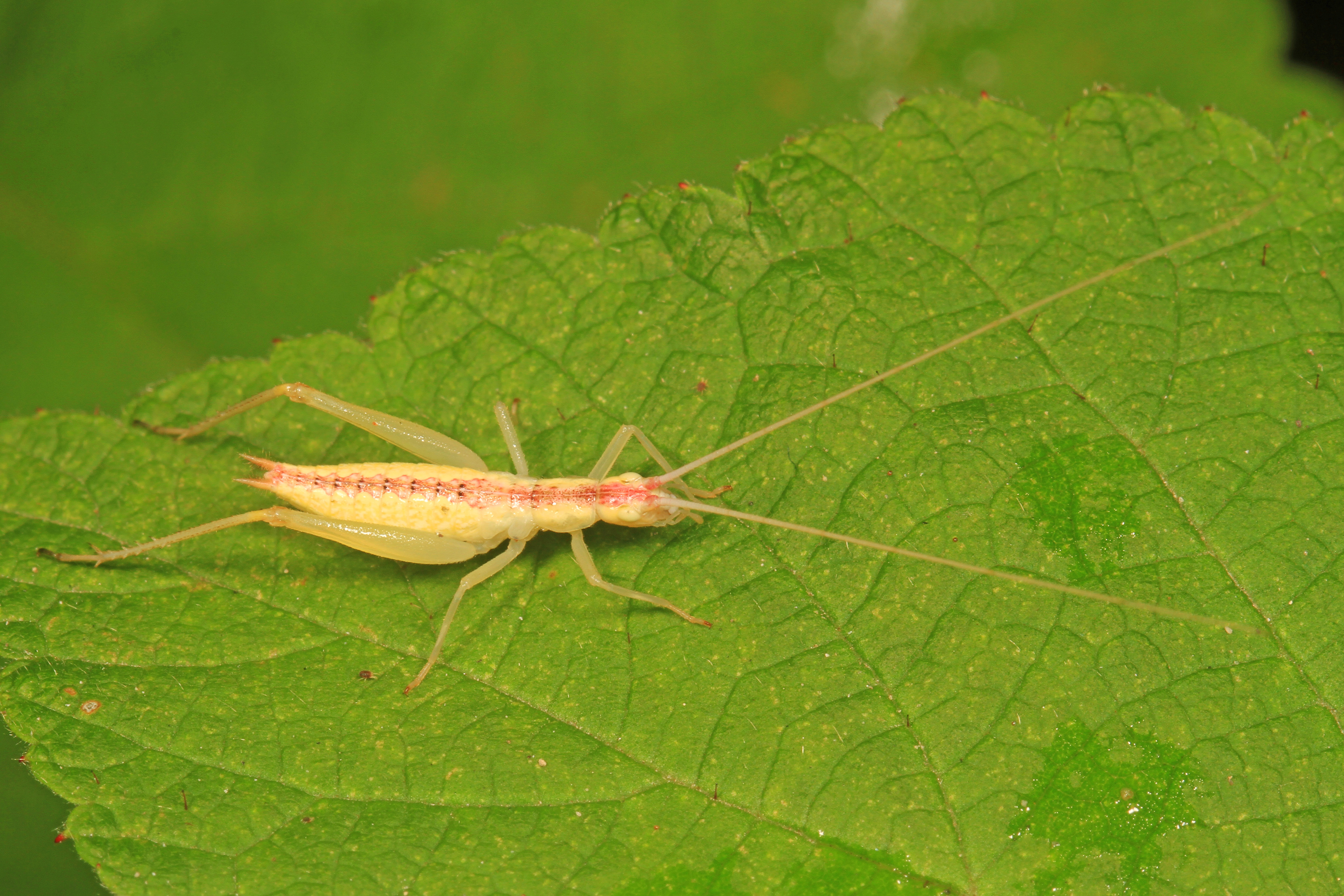

Scientific classification
- Domain: Eukaryota
- Kingdom: Animalia
- Phylum: Arthropoda
- Class: Insecta
- Order: Orthoptera
- Suborder: Ensifera
- Family: Oecanthidae
- Tribe: Oecanthini
- Genus: Oecanthus
- Species: O. latipennis

Binomial name
- Oecanthus latipennis Riley, C.V. 1881

= Oecanthus latipennis =

Species of cricket

Oecanthus latipennis is a "common tree cricket" in the subfamily Oecanthinae ("tree crickets"). A common name for O. latipennis is broad-winged tree cricket. It is found in North America.

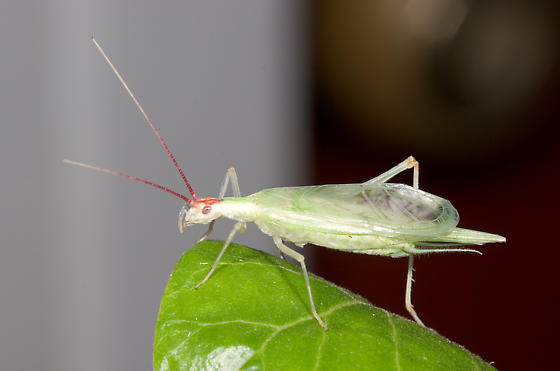
