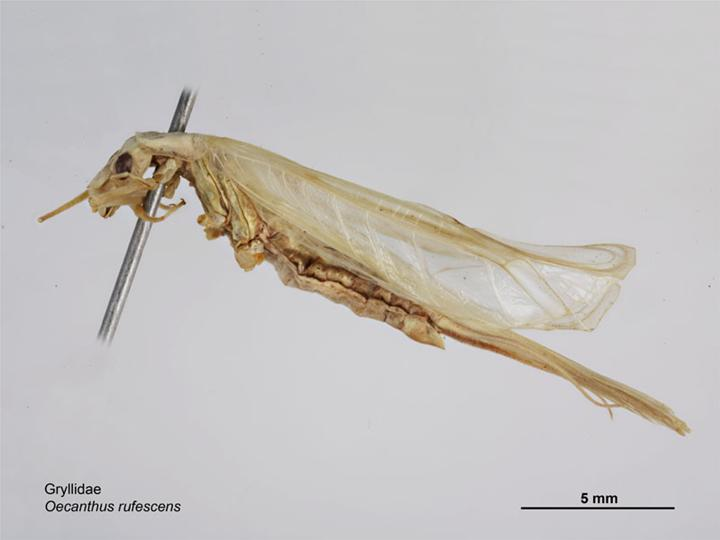

Scientific classification
- Domain: Eukaryota
- Kingdom: Animalia
- Phylum: Arthropoda
- Class: Insecta
- Order: Orthoptera
- Suborder: Ensifera
- Family: Oecanthidae
- Genus: Oecanthus
- Species: O. rufescens

Binomial name
- Oecanthus rufescens Serville, 1838

Synonyms
- Oecanthus lineatus Walker, 1869; Oecanthus gracilis Haan, 1844

= Oecanthus rufescens =

Species of cricket

Oecanthus rufescens, known as the striped tree cricket, is a species of tree cricket from Asia.
