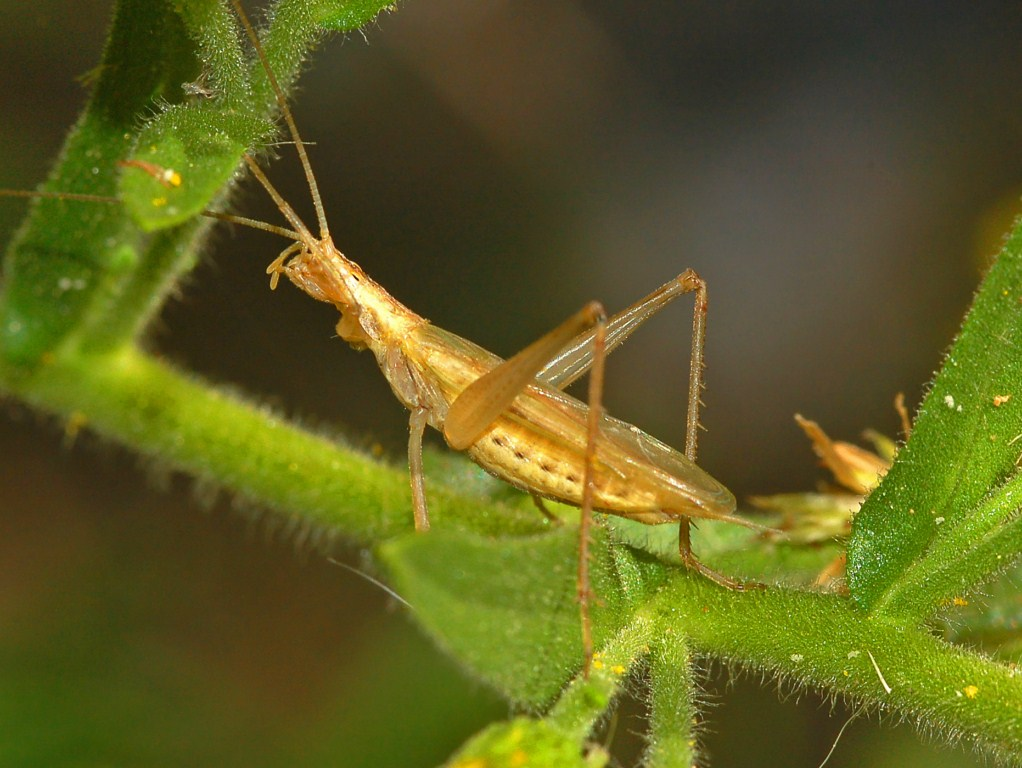
- Male of Oecanthus pellucens
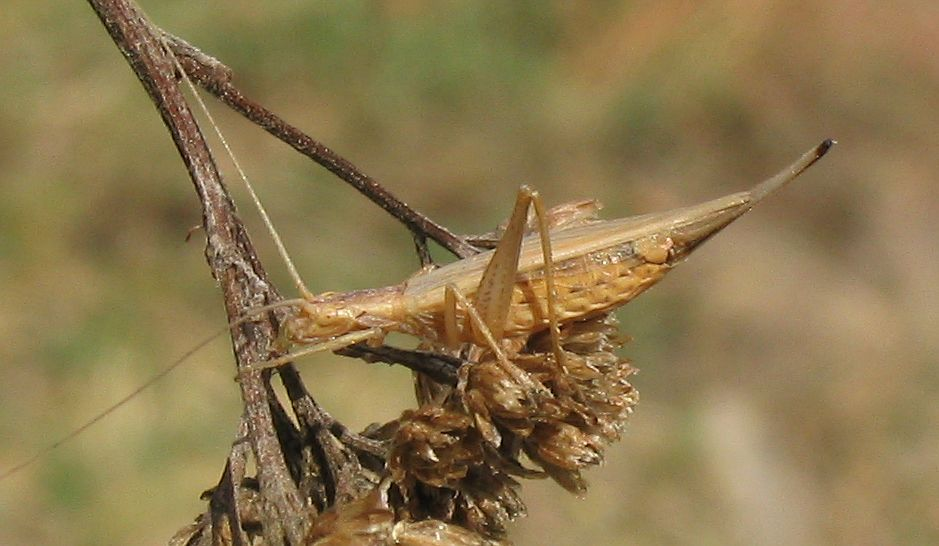
- Female

Conservation status
- Least Concern (IUCN 3.1)

Scientific classification
- Kingdom: Animalia
- Phylum: Arthropoda
- Clade: Pancrustacea
- Class: Insecta
- Order: Orthoptera
- Suborder: Ensifera
- Family: Oecanthidae
- Tribe: Oecanthini
- Genus: Oecanthus
- Species: O. pellucens

Binomial name
- Oecanthus pellucens (Scopoli, 1763)

= Oecanthus pellucens =

Species of cricket

Sound of Oecanthus pellucens
Field recording in the Netherlands 26s

Close-Up of Oecanthus pellucens

Oecanthus pellucens, common name European tree cricket, is a species of tree crickets belonging to the family Oecanthidae, subfamily Oecanthinae.

== Subspecies ==
Subspecies include:

- Oecanthus pellucens calinensis Jannone, 1936
- Oecanthus pellucens pellucens (Scopoli, 1763)

== Distribution ==
This species is present in most of Europe, especially in the countries around the Mediterranean with a focus on Southern Europe. The northern boundary runs through northern France, Belgium, southern Germany, the Czech Republic and southern Poland. The first, apparently viable, British colony was discovered near Dungeness in Kent in 2015. In southern Europe there is also the closely related and very similar species Oecanthus dulcisonans. It is also present in the eastern Palearctic realm, in the Near East, and in North Africa.

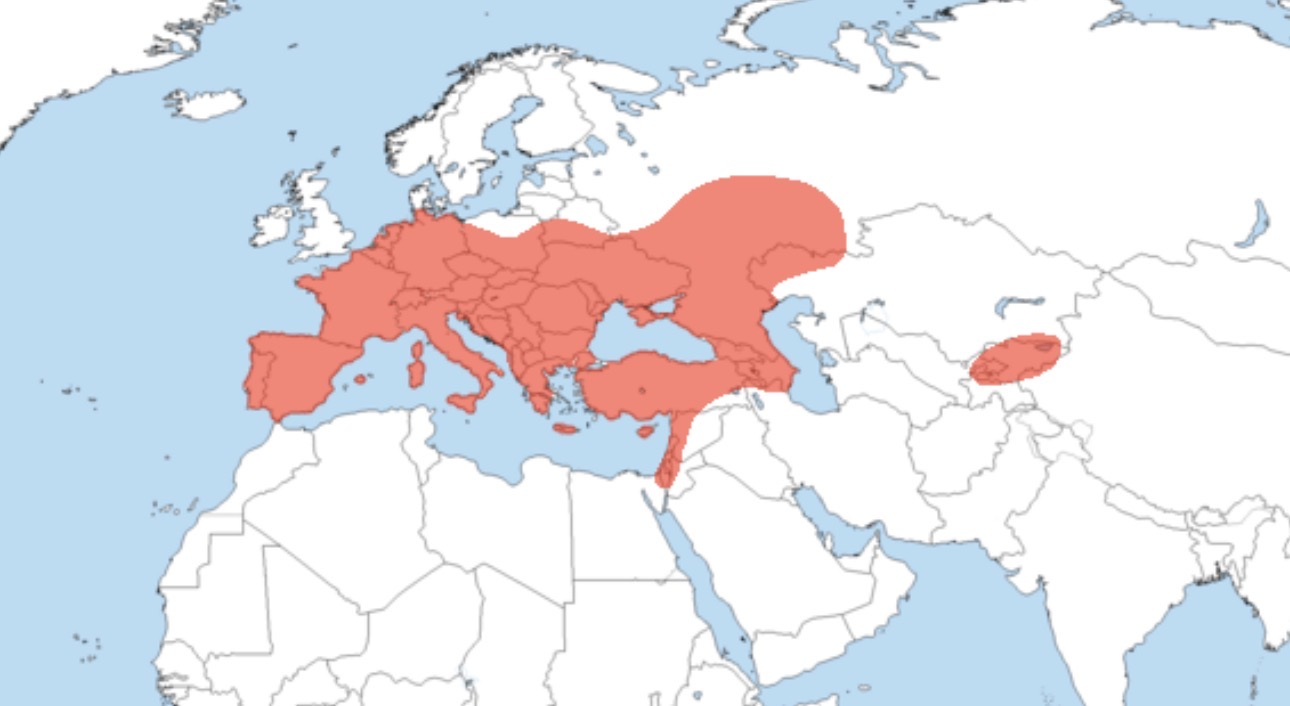
European Tree Cricket Habitat Map

== Habitat ==
The typical habitat of Oecanthus pellucens are sunny meadows with high vegetation and dry warm and nutrient-poor areas such as grasslands, sand dunes and brownfield lands.

== Description ==
The adult males grow up to 10–13 millimetres (0.39–0.51 in) long, the female is slightly larger than the male, about 11–14 millimetres (0.43–0.55 in) long. The colouration of Oecanthus pellucens is yellowish-brown, straw-colored. The body is very elongated and slender. The wings usually protrude out slightly above the abdomen, but can be shorter or longer. The wings of the males are larger than those of females. The antennae are longer than the body. The ovipositor of the female is long and slightly curved. The females are recognizable by the club-shaped end of the ovipositor.

== Biology ==
Adults can be encountered from July through October. These crickets are mainly nocturnal. The males rub their wings together (stridulation) to produce a subtle but constant, fluctuating in volume sound. They sing from about five o'clock until three o'clock in the morning. After mating, the female lays her eggs in plant stems, especially in grape (Vitis vinifera). In June the nymphs live in the tissue and leaves of the plant. A few days after the last molt the male begins to sing. These crickets are omnivorous and usually feed on leaves or delicate flower parts such as pollen and petals, but also on animal foods such as aphids, spiders and insect larvae.

== Gallery ==
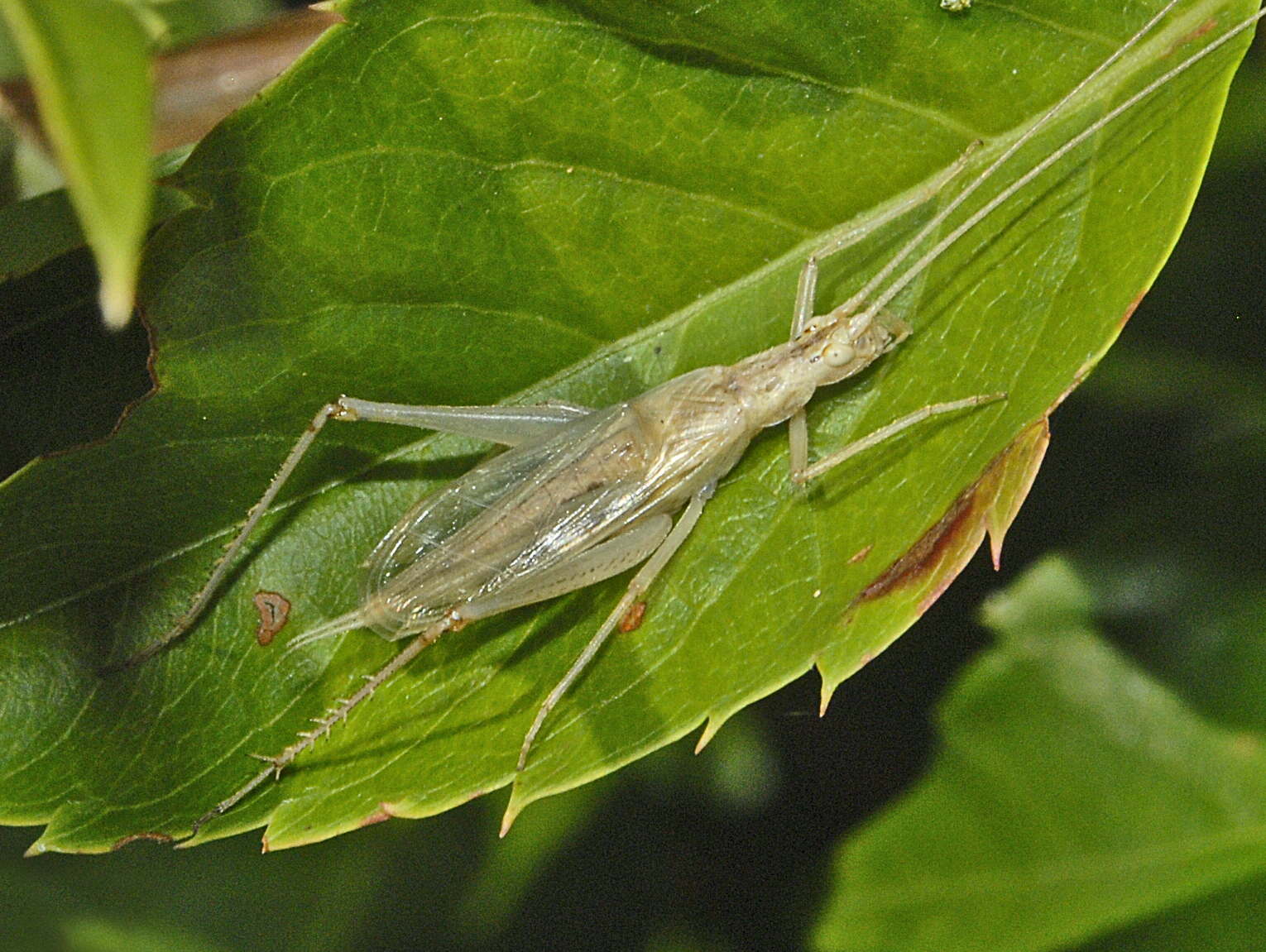
Male of Oecanthus pellucens

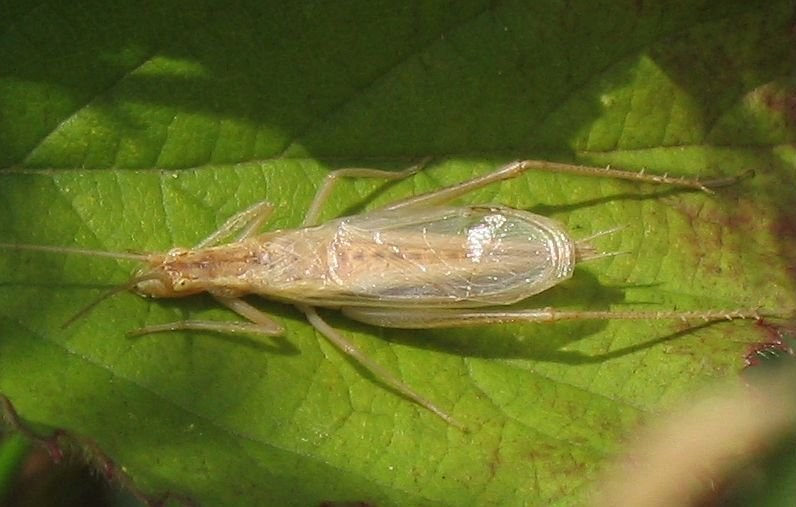
Male of Oecanthus pellucens

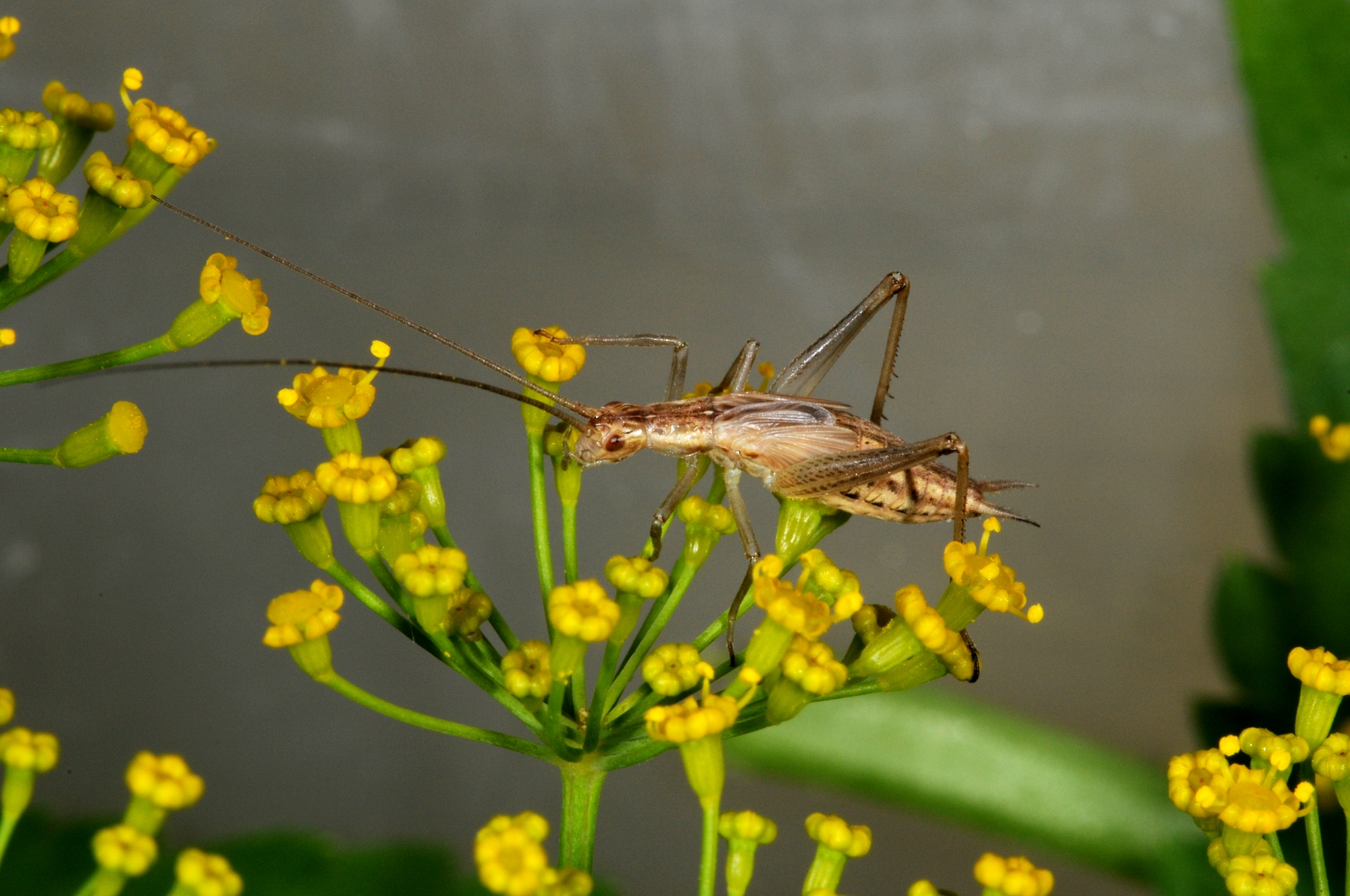
Short-winged female of Oecanthus pellucens

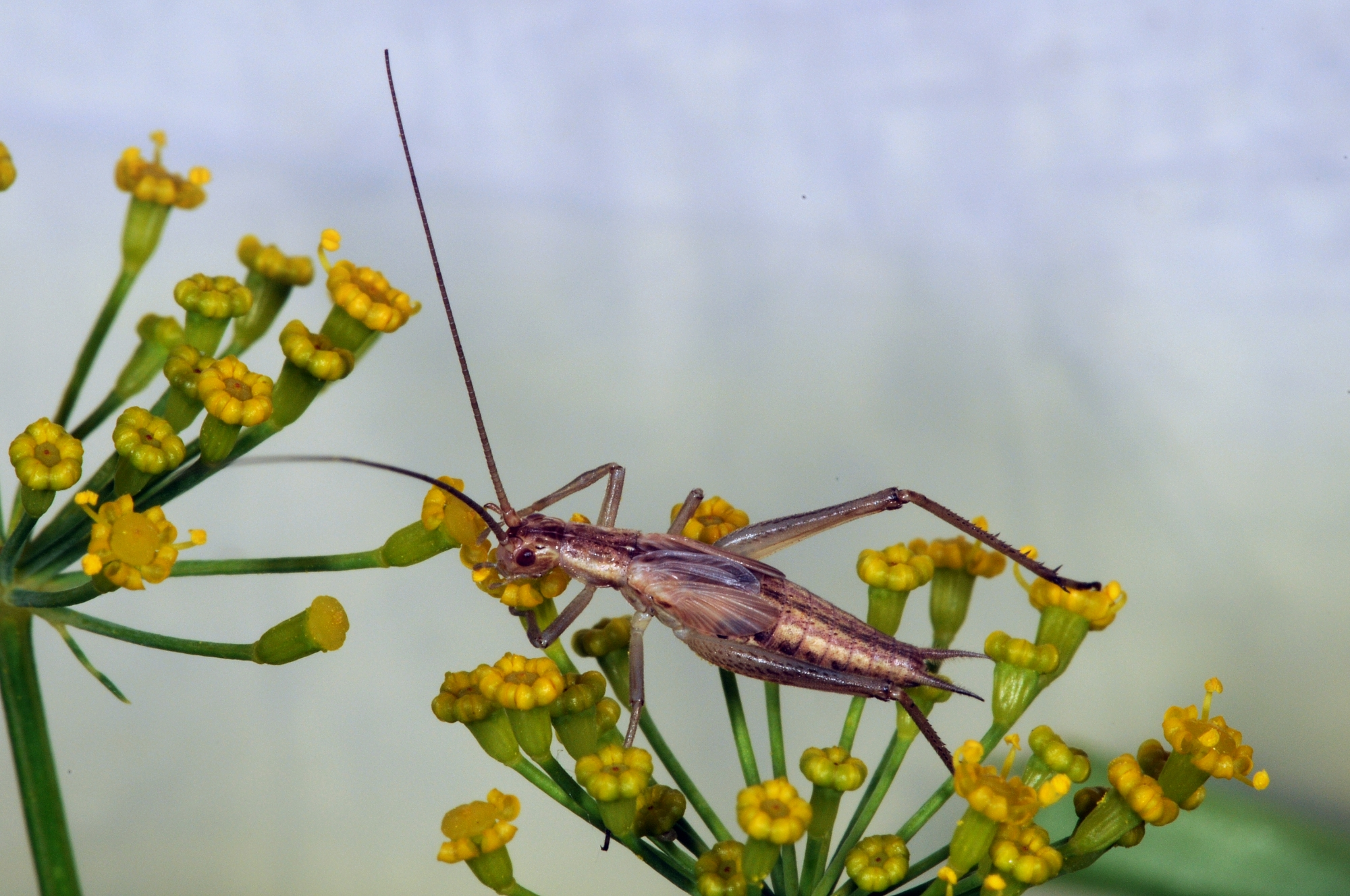
Short-winged female of Oecanthus pellucens
