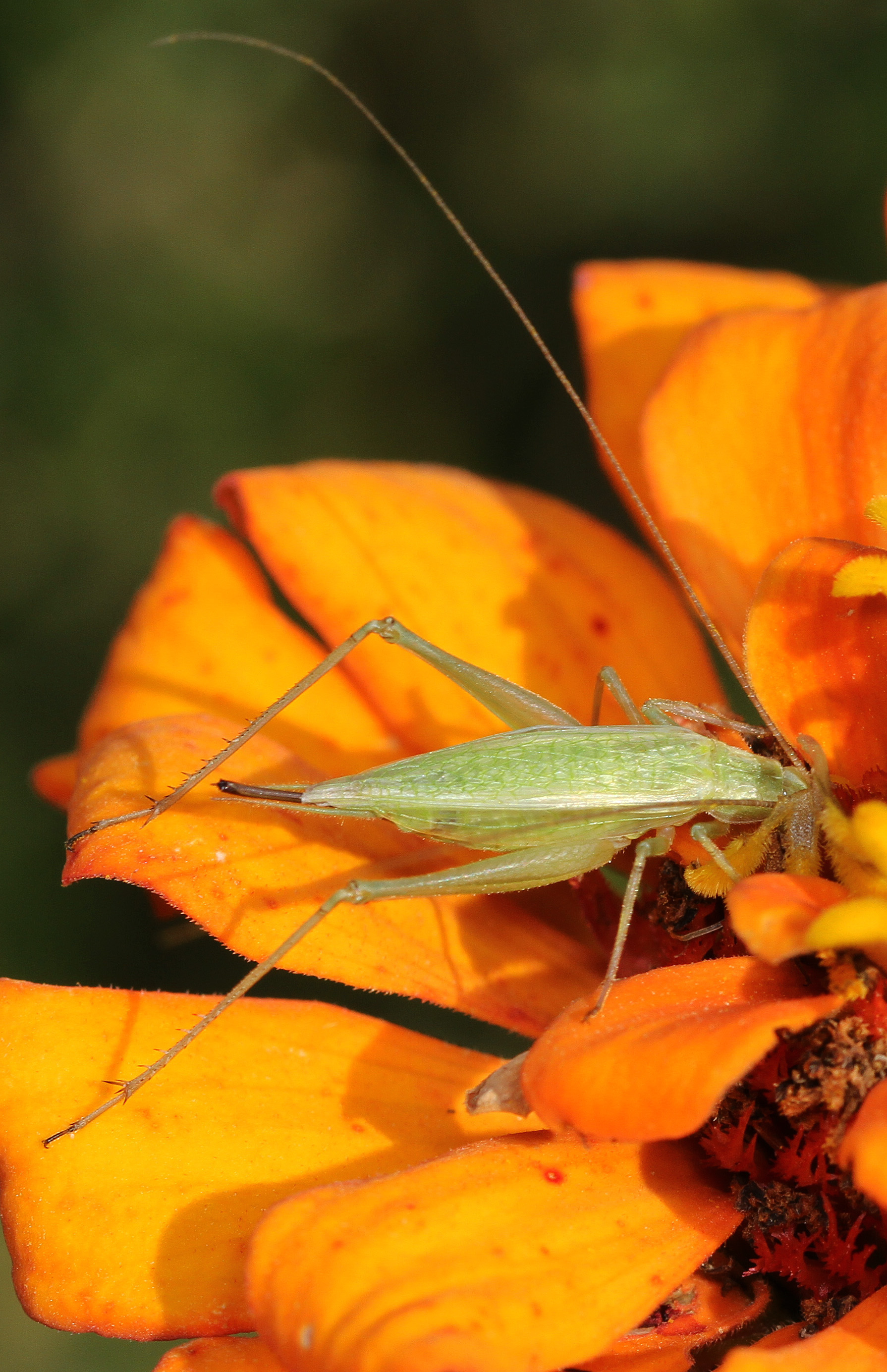

Scientific classification
- Kingdom: Animalia
- Phylum: Arthropoda
- Clade: Pancrustacea
- Class: Insecta
- Order: Orthoptera
- Suborder: Ensifera
- Family: Oecanthidae
- Tribe: Oecanthini
- Genus: Oecanthus
- Species: O. quadripunctatus

Binomial name
- Oecanthus quadripunctatus Beutenmüller. 1894

= Oecanthus quadripunctatus =

Species of cricket

Oecanthus quadripunctatus is a "common tree cricket" in the subfamily Oecanthinae ("tree crickets"). A common name for O. quadripunctatus is four-spotted tree cricket. It is found in North America.

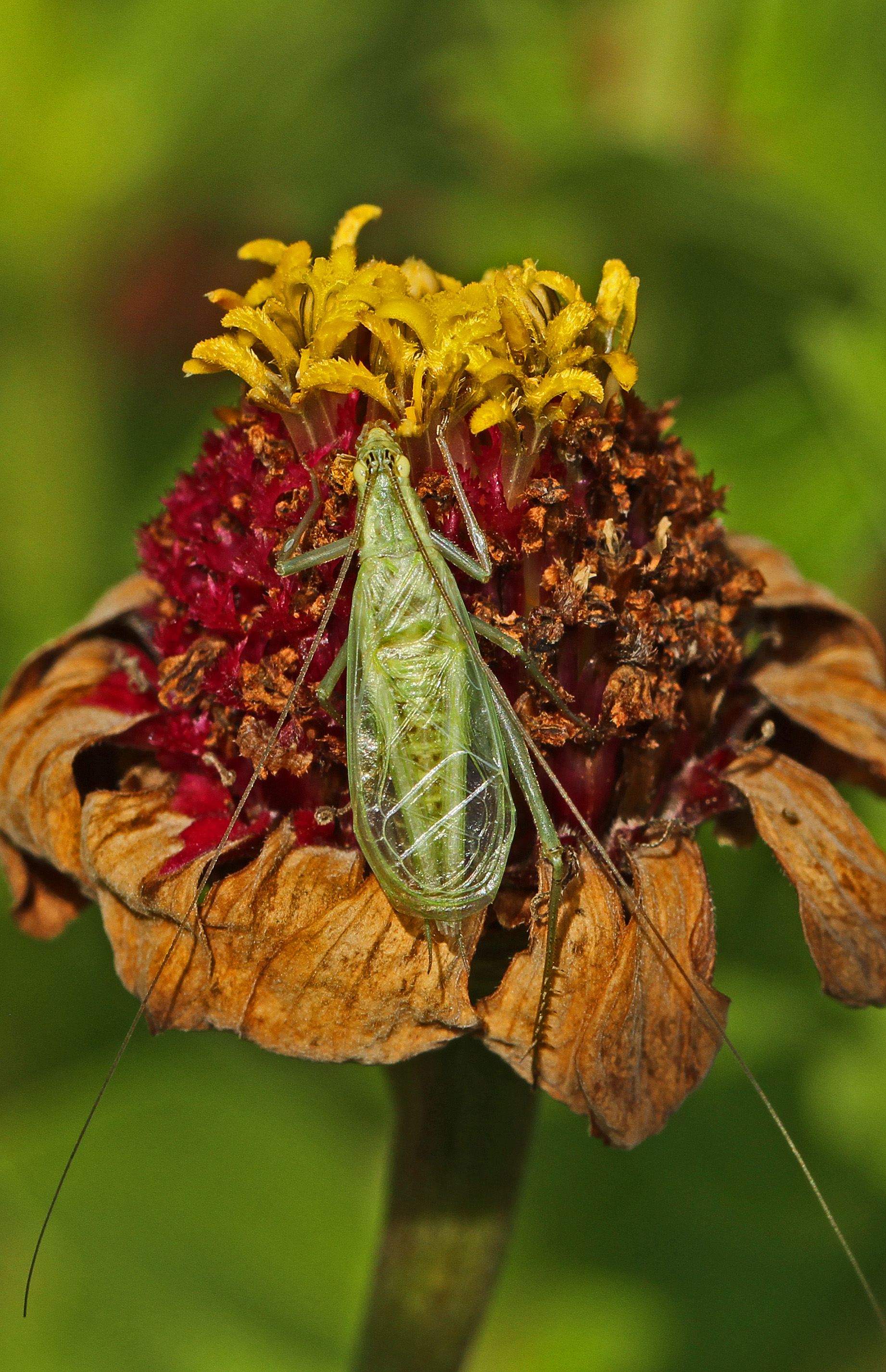

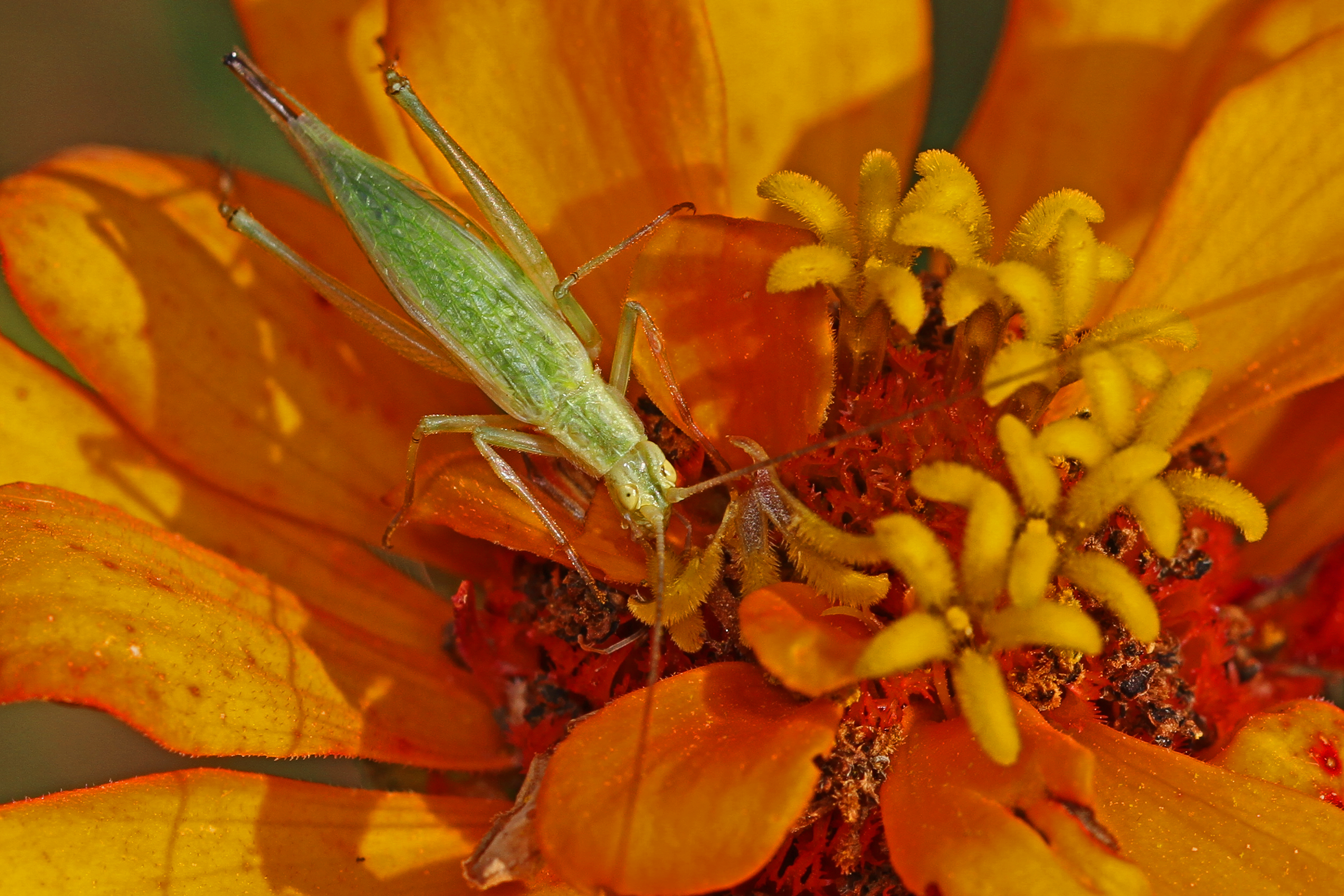
