= Oecanthus pini =

Scientific classification
- Kingdom: Animalia
- Phylum: Arthropoda
- Class: Insecta
- Order: Orthoptera
- Suborder: Ensifera
- Family: Oecanthidae
- Tribe: Oecanthini
- Genus: Oecanthus
- Species: O. pini

Binomial name
- Oecanthus pini Beutenmuller, 1894

Species of cricket

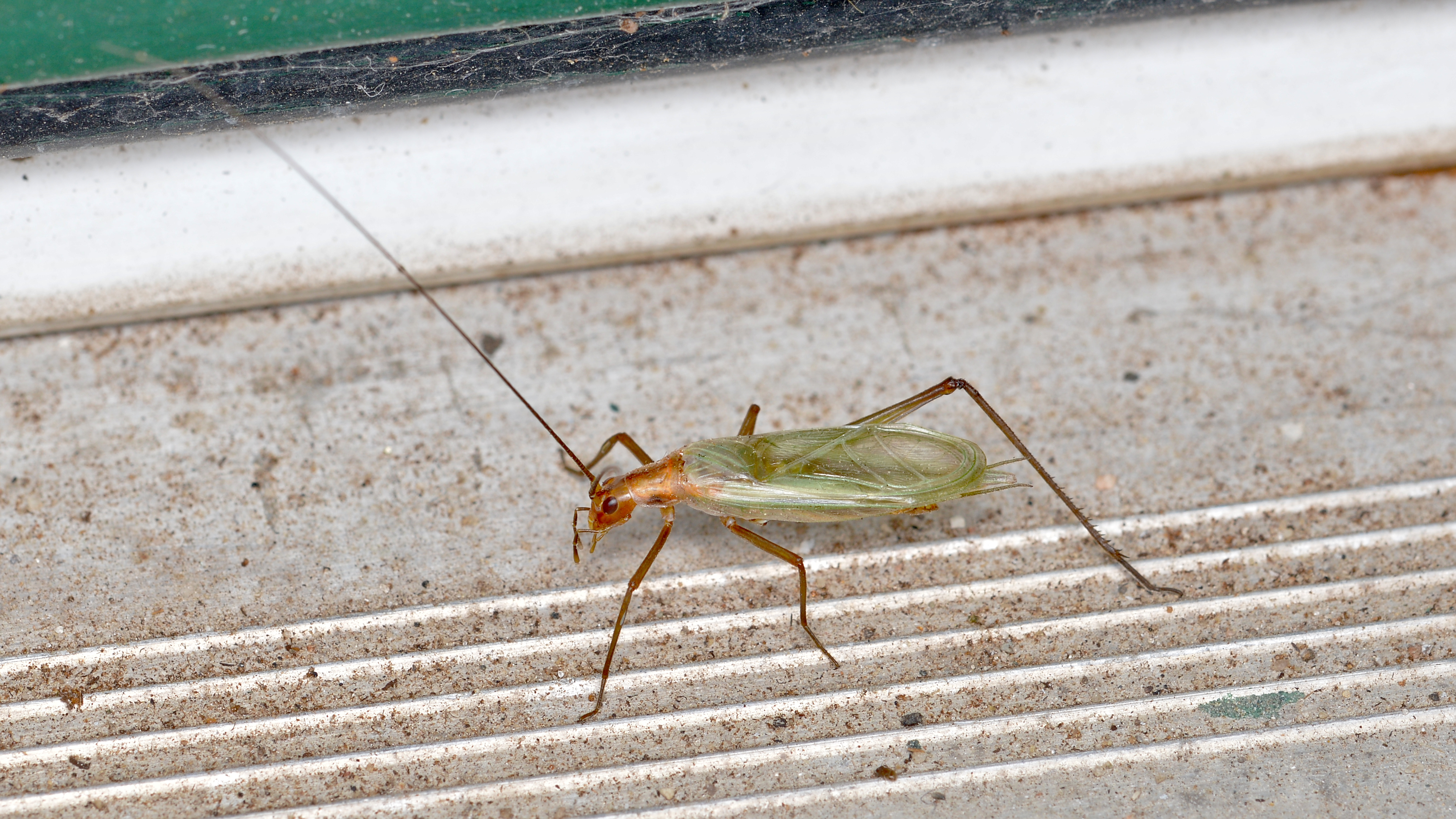
Photograph of the Pine Tree Cricket

Oecanthus pini, the pine tree cricket, is a species of tree cricket in the family Oecanthidae. It is found in North America.
