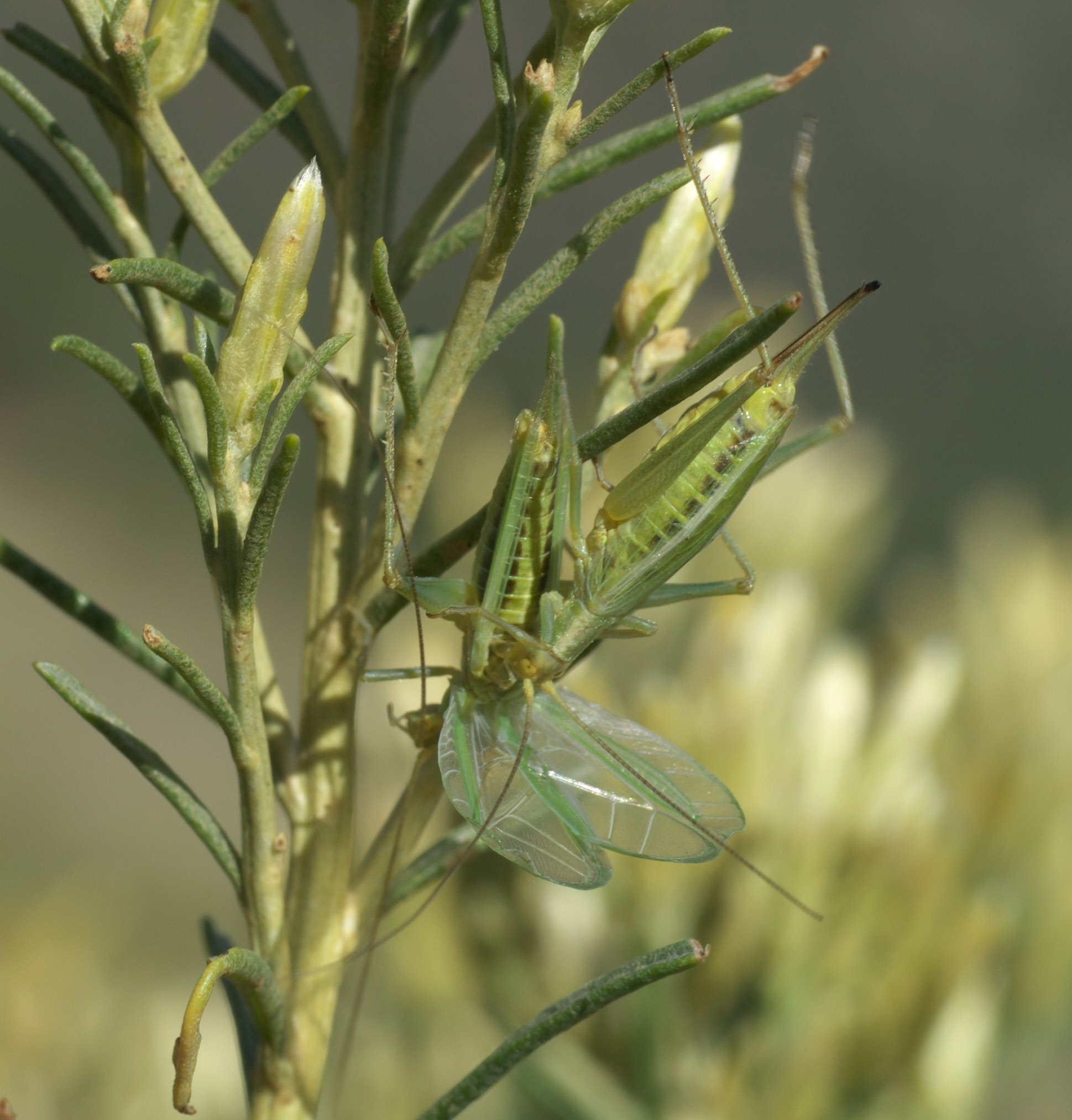

Conservation status
- Secure (NatureServe)

Scientific classification
- Kingdom: Animalia
- Phylum: Arthropoda
- Class: Insecta
- Order: Orthoptera
- Suborder: Ensifera
- Family: Oecanthidae
- Genus: Oecanthus
- Species: O. argentinus

Binomial name
- Oecanthus argentinus Saussure, 1874

= Oecanthus argentinus =

Species of cricket

Oecanthus argentinus, the prairie tree cricket, is a species of tree cricket in the family Oecanthidae. It is found in North America and South America.
