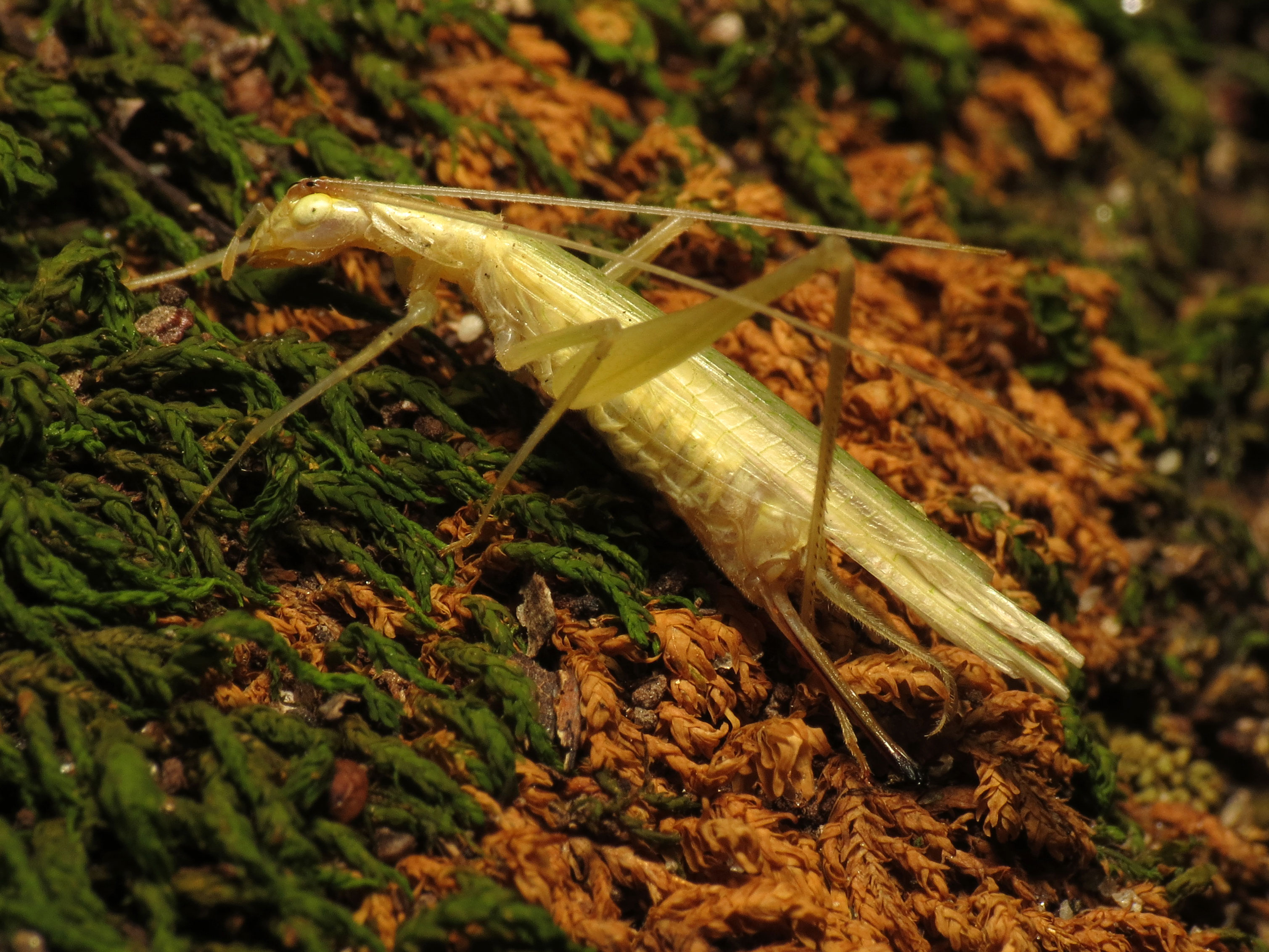

Conservation status
- Least Concern (IUCN 3.1)

Scientific classification
- Kingdom: Animalia
- Phylum: Arthropoda
- Class: Insecta
- Order: Orthoptera
- Suborder: Ensifera
- Family: Oecanthidae
- Tribe: Oecanthini
- Genus: Oecanthus
- Species: O. exclamationis

Binomial name
- Oecanthus exclamationis Davis, W.T. 1907

= Oecanthus exclamationis =

Species of cricket

Oecanthus exclamationis is a "common tree cricket" in the subfamily Oecanthinae ("tree crickets"). A common name for O. exclamationis is Davis' tree cricket. It is found in North America.
