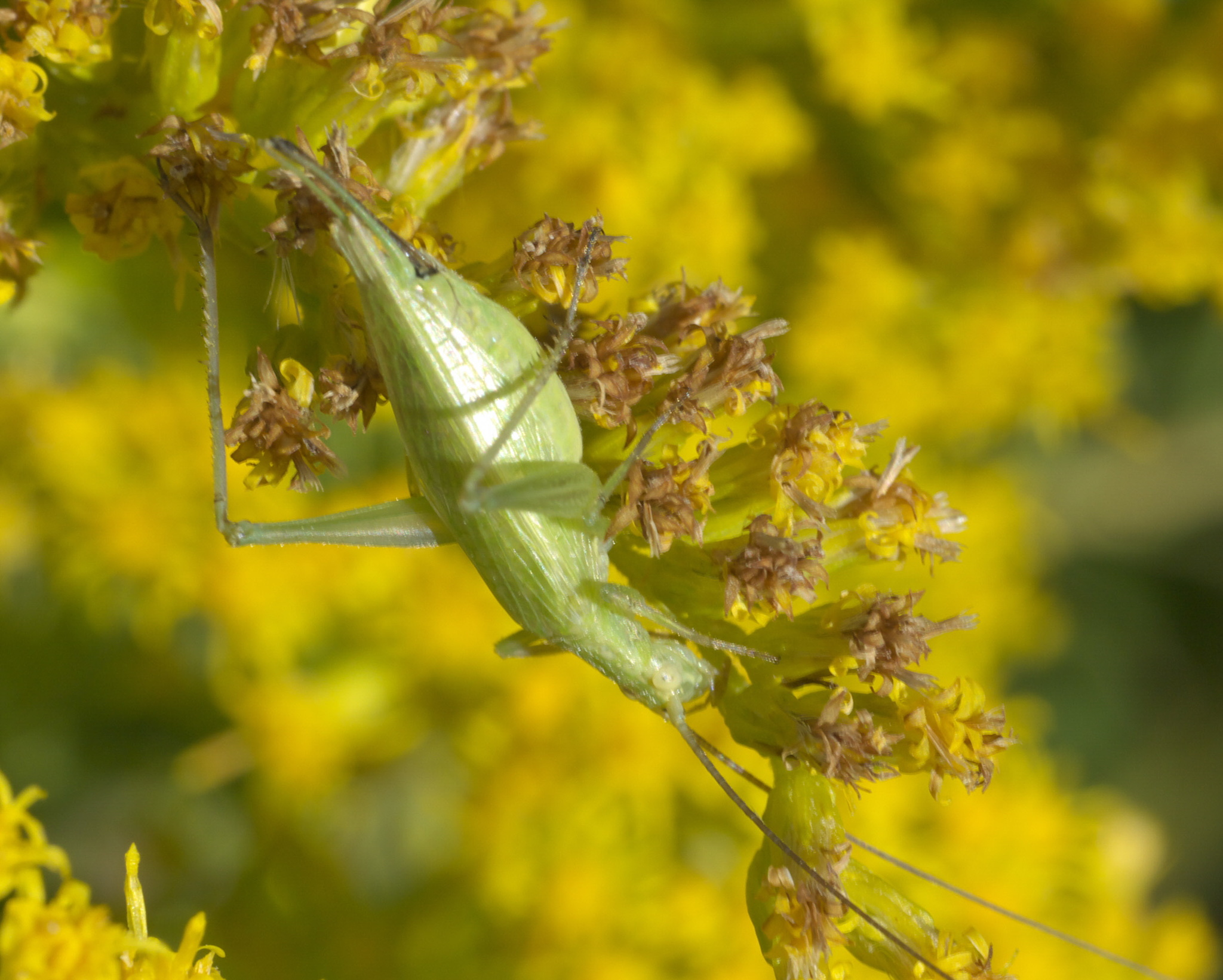
- Oecanthus celerinictus, Virginia

Scientific classification
- Kingdom: Animalia
- Phylum: Arthropoda
- Class: Insecta
- Order: Orthoptera
- Suborder: Ensifera
- Family: Oecanthidae
- Tribe: Oecanthini
- Genus: Oecanthus
- Species: O. celerinictus

Binomial name
- Oecanthus celerinictus T. J. Walker, 1963

= Oecanthus celerinictus =

Species of cricket

Oecanthus celerinictus, the fast-calling tree cricket, is a species of tree cricket in the family Oecanthidae. It is found in North America.
