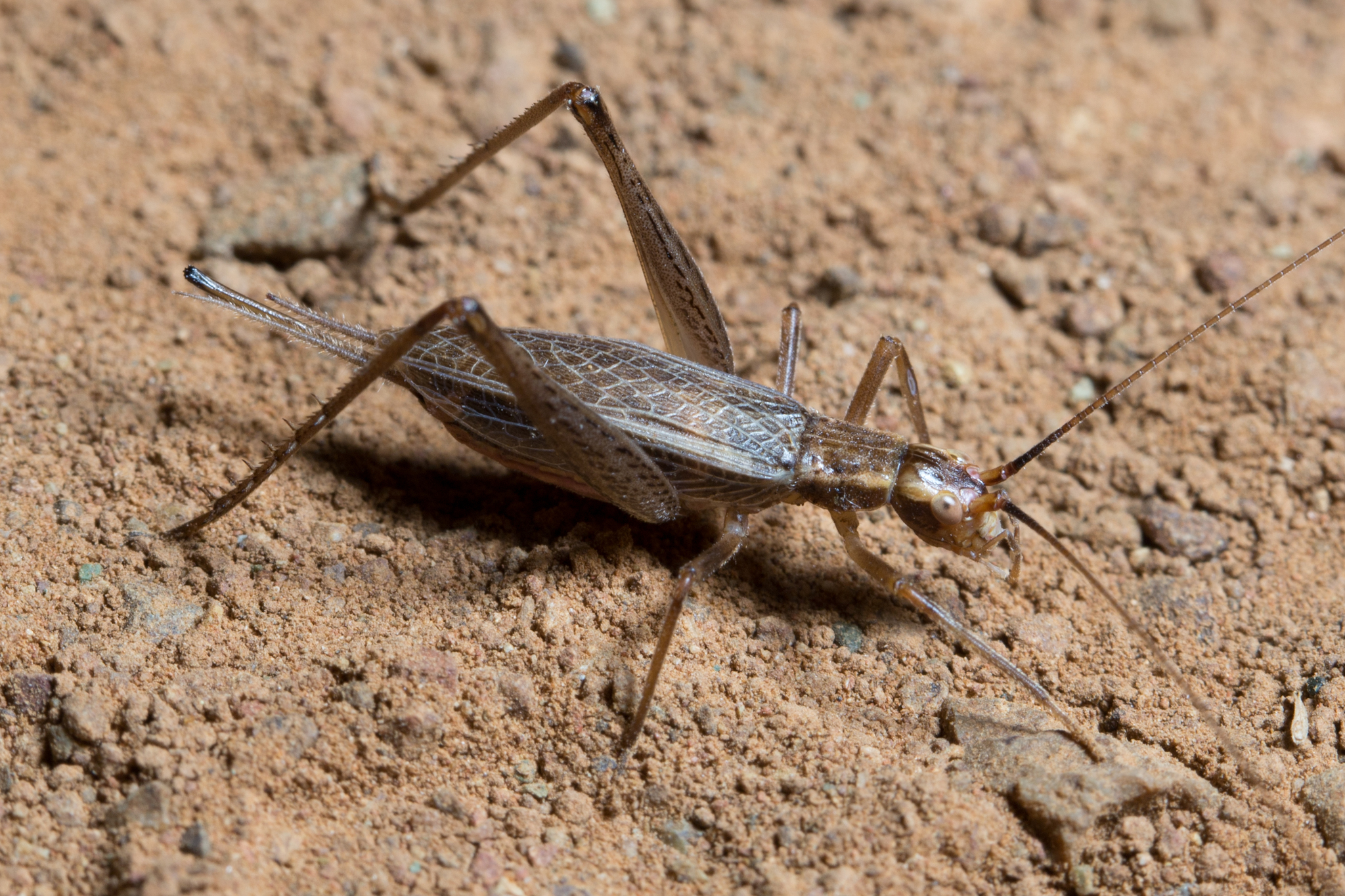

Scientific classification
- Kingdom: Animalia
- Phylum: Arthropoda
- Class: Insecta
- Order: Orthoptera
- Suborder: Ensifera
- Family: Oecanthidae
- Tribe: Oecanthini
- Genus: Oecanthus
- Species: O. californicus

Binomial name
- Oecanthus californicus Saussure, 1874

= Oecanthus californicus =

Species of cricket

Oecanthus californicus, the western tree cricket, is a species of tree cricket in the family Oecanthidae. It is found in North America.

== Subspecies ==
These two subspecies belong to the species Oecanthus californicus:

- Oecanthus californicus californicus Saussure, 1874
- Oecanthus californicus pictipennis Hebard, 1935
