= Leptogryllus =

Scientific classification
- Kingdom: Animalia
- Phylum: Arthropoda
- Class: Insecta
- Order: Orthoptera
- Suborder: Ensifera
- Family: Oecanthidae
- Tribe: Xabeini
- Genus: Leptogryllus; Perkins, 1899

Genus of crickets

Leptogryllus is a genus of Hawaiian crickets. Species include:

- Leptogryllus apicalis Perkins, 1910
- Leptogryllus deceptor Perkins, 1910
- Leptogryllus elongatus Perkins, 1899
- Leptogryllus forficularis (Brunner von Wattenwyl, 1895)
- Leptogryllus fusconotatus Perkins, 1899
- Leptogryllus hanaula Otte, 1994
- Leptogryllus haupu Otte, 1994
- Leptogryllus kaala Otte, 1994
- Leptogryllus kainalu Otte, 1994
- Leptogryllus kauaiensis Perkins, 1899
- Leptogryllus kawela Otte, 1994
- Leptogryllus kipahulu Otte, 1994
- Leptogryllus kohala Otte, 1994
- Leptogryllus lanaiensis Otte, 1994
- Leptogryllus luteus Otte, 1994
- Leptogryllus mauiensis Otte, 1994
- Leptogryllus mauumae Otte, 1994
- Leptogryllus molokai Otte, 1994
- Leptogryllus montgomeri Otte, 1994
- Leptogryllus nigrolineatus (Perkins, 1899)
- Leptogryllus nigromaculatus Perkins, 1899
- Leptogryllus oahuensis Otte, 1994
- Leptogryllus ookala Otte, 1994
- Leptogryllus perkinsi Otte, 1994
- Leptogryllus poamoho Otte, 1994
- Leptogryllus similis Perkins, 1899
- Leptogryllus simillimus Perkins, 1899
- Leptogryllus waikemoi Otte, 1994
