= Thaumatogryllus =

- Thaumatogryllus cavicola

Scientific classification
- Domain: Eukaryota
- Kingdom: Animalia
- Phylum: Arthropoda
- Class: Insecta
- Order: Orthoptera
- Suborder: Ensifera
- Family: Oecanthidae
- Tribe: Xabeini
- Genus: Thaumatogryllus; Perkins, 1899

Type species
- Thaumatogryllus variegatus Perkins, 1899

Species
- 4, see text

Genus of crickets

Thaumatogryllus is a genus of crickets in the family Oecanthidae. It was first described by British entomologist Robert Cyril Layton Perkins in 1899, with T. variegatus as the type and sole species. It currently includes four species, all known from the islands of Hawaiʻi.

== Species ==
This genus includes the following species:

- Thaumatogryllus cavicola Gurney & Rentz, 1978 – Hawaiʻi Island
- Thaumatogryllus conanti Otte, 1994 – Nīhoa
- Thaumatogryllus mauiensis Otte, 1994 – Maui
- Thaumatogryllus variegatus Perkins, 1899 – Kauaʻi
