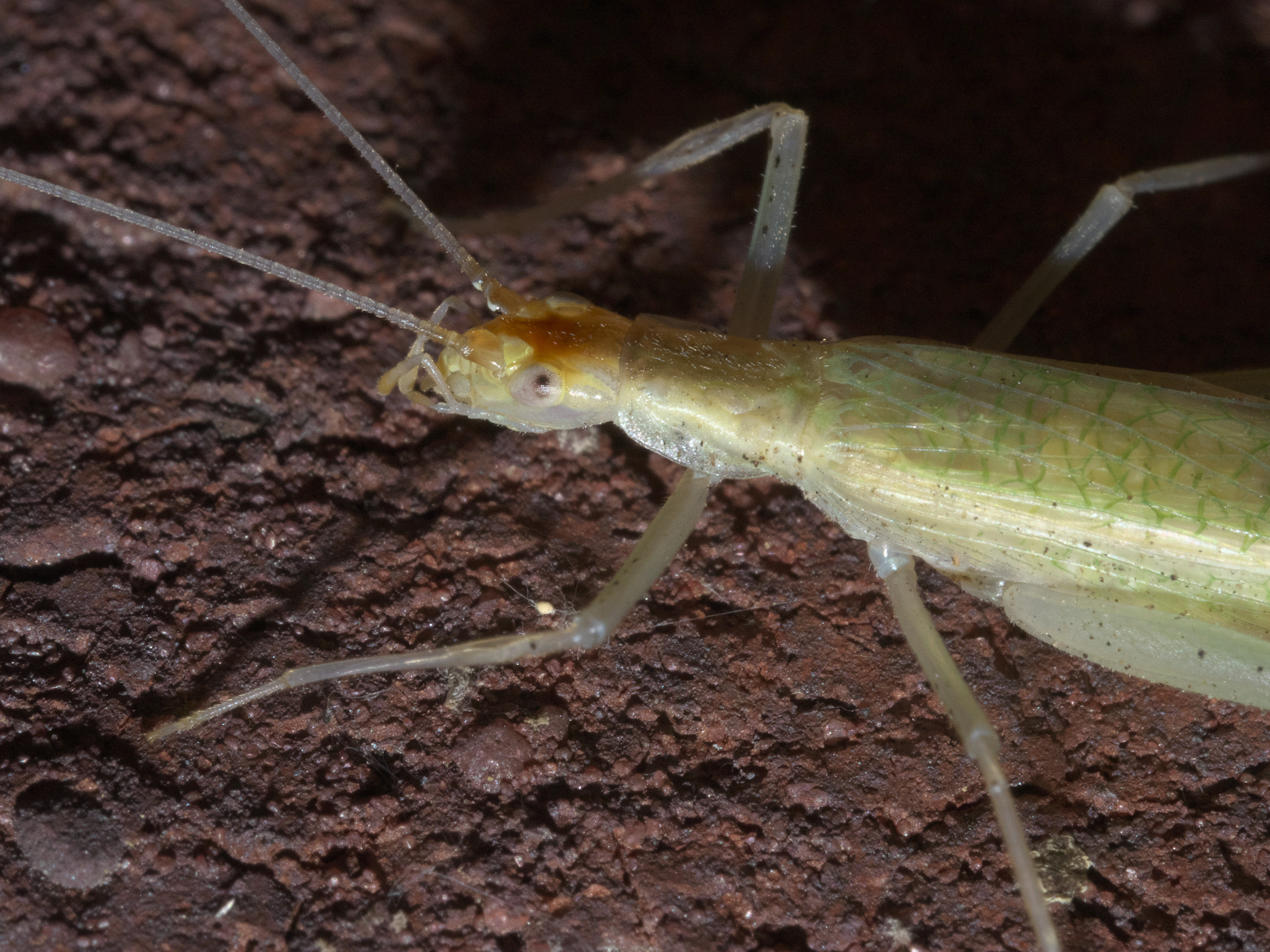

Scientific classification
- Kingdom: Animalia
- Phylum: Arthropoda
- Clade: Pancrustacea
- Class: Insecta
- Order: Orthoptera
- Suborder: Ensifera
- Family: Oecanthidae
- Tribe: Oecanthini
- Genus: Oecanthus
- Species: O. niveus

Binomial name
- Oecanthus niveus (De Geer, 1773)

= Oecanthus niveus =

Species of cricket

Oecanthus niveus, known generally as the narrow-winged tree cricket or sometimes snowy tree cricket (though possibly from confusion with Oecanthus fultoni), is a species of tree cricket in the family Oecanthidae. First noted by Swedish Entomologist Charles de Geer in 1773 by a Pennsylvanian Specimen, it is found primarily in Eastern North America south of Canada, and also in the Caribbean.

== Identification ==
Adult O. niveus are typically 13-16mm in length. They are a pale green with a pale orange head, and feature a dark streak running medially along the pronotum. On top of the head is an orange cap.

== Habitat ==
O. niveus can be found on broad-leaved trees, herbaceous plants, shrubbery, and in man-made orchards.

== Song ==
Like other members of the genus Oecanthus, the song of the male narrow-winged tree cricket varies in pitch and beats per minute depending the temperature, with warmer temperatures resulting in more rapid calling at a higher pitch. At 25°C, the pulse rate averages 71/sec at a frequency of 3.0 kHz. Songs are most often heard at night in late summer and autumn.

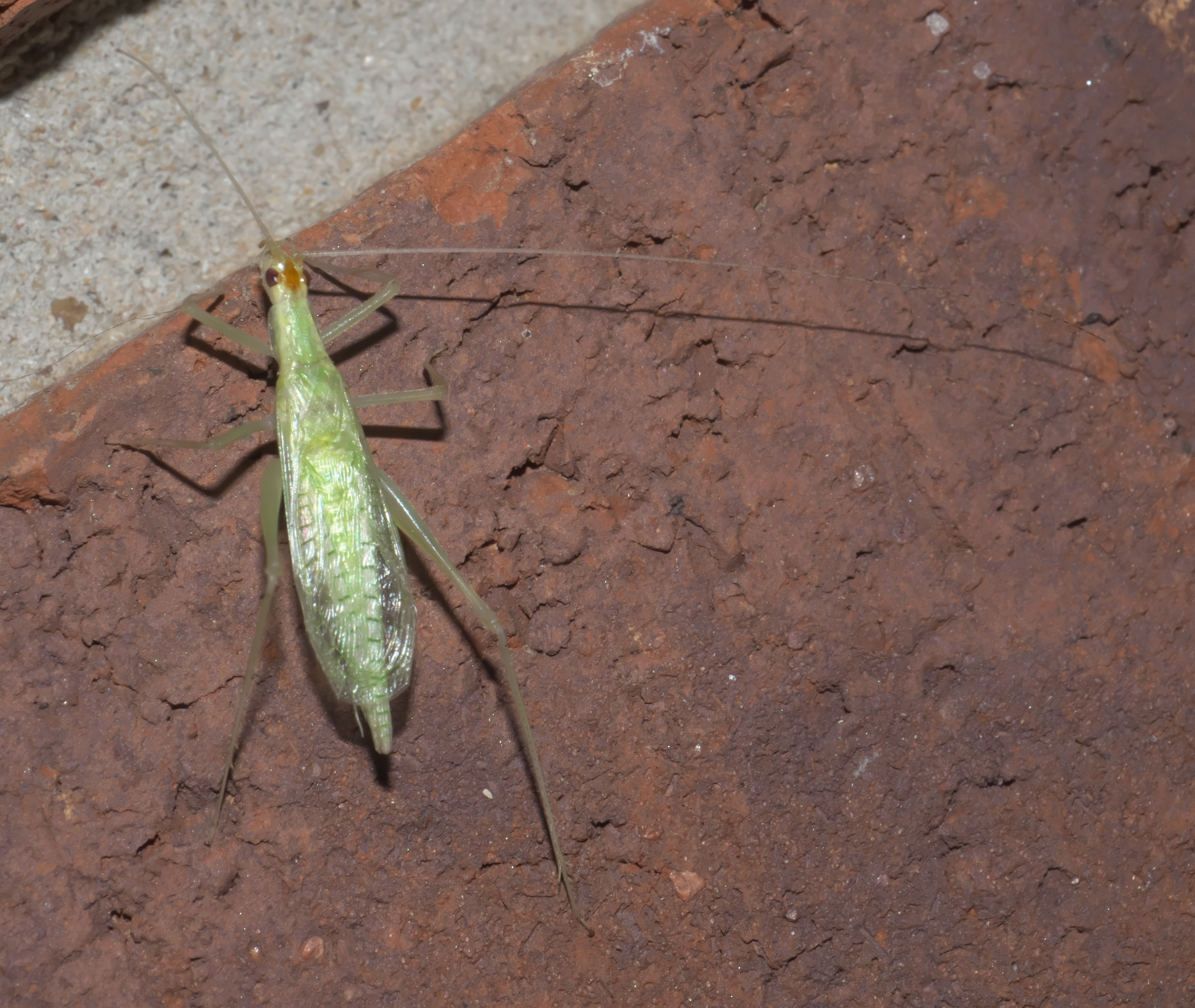
Narrow-winged tree cricket, Oecanthus niveus

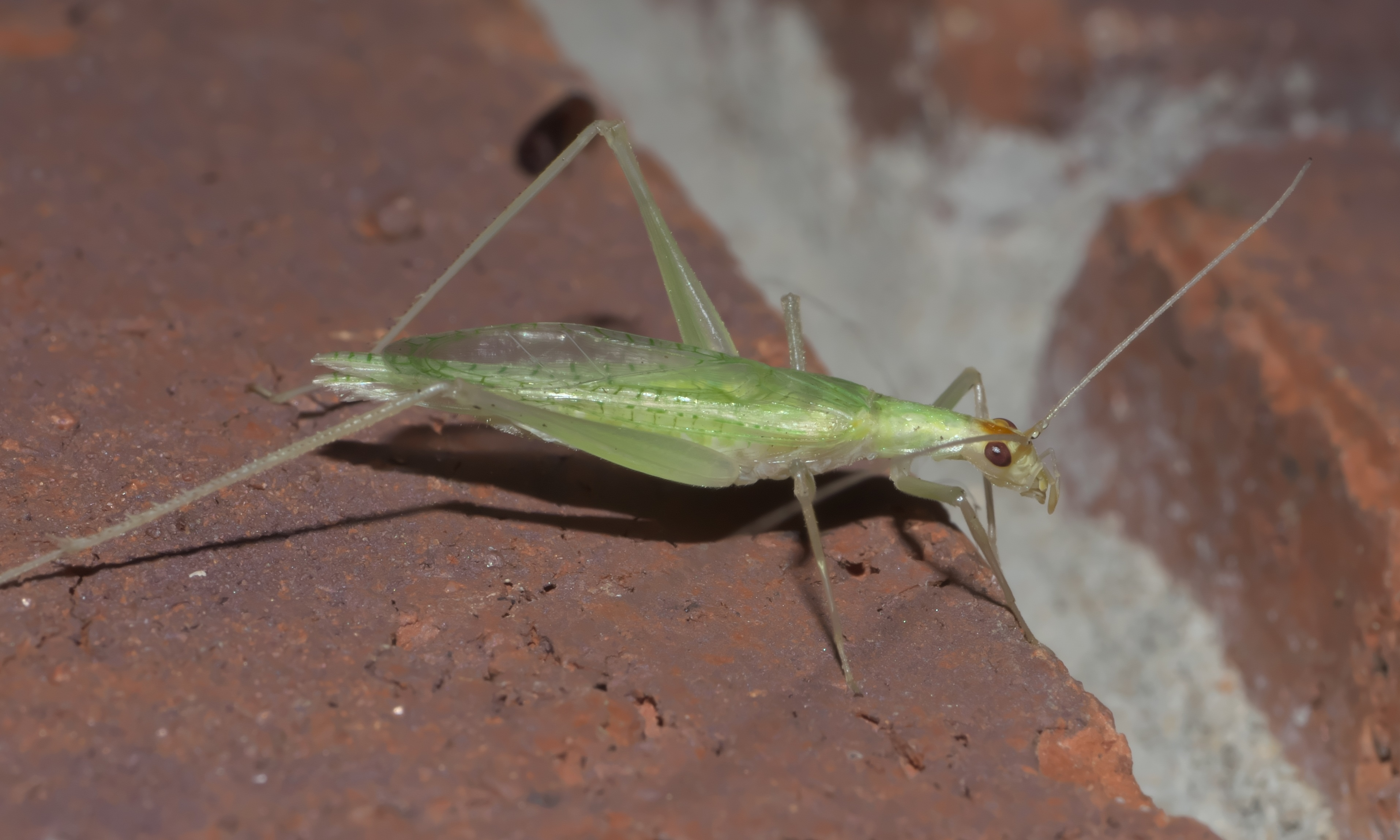
Narrow-winged tree cricket, Oecanthus niveus
