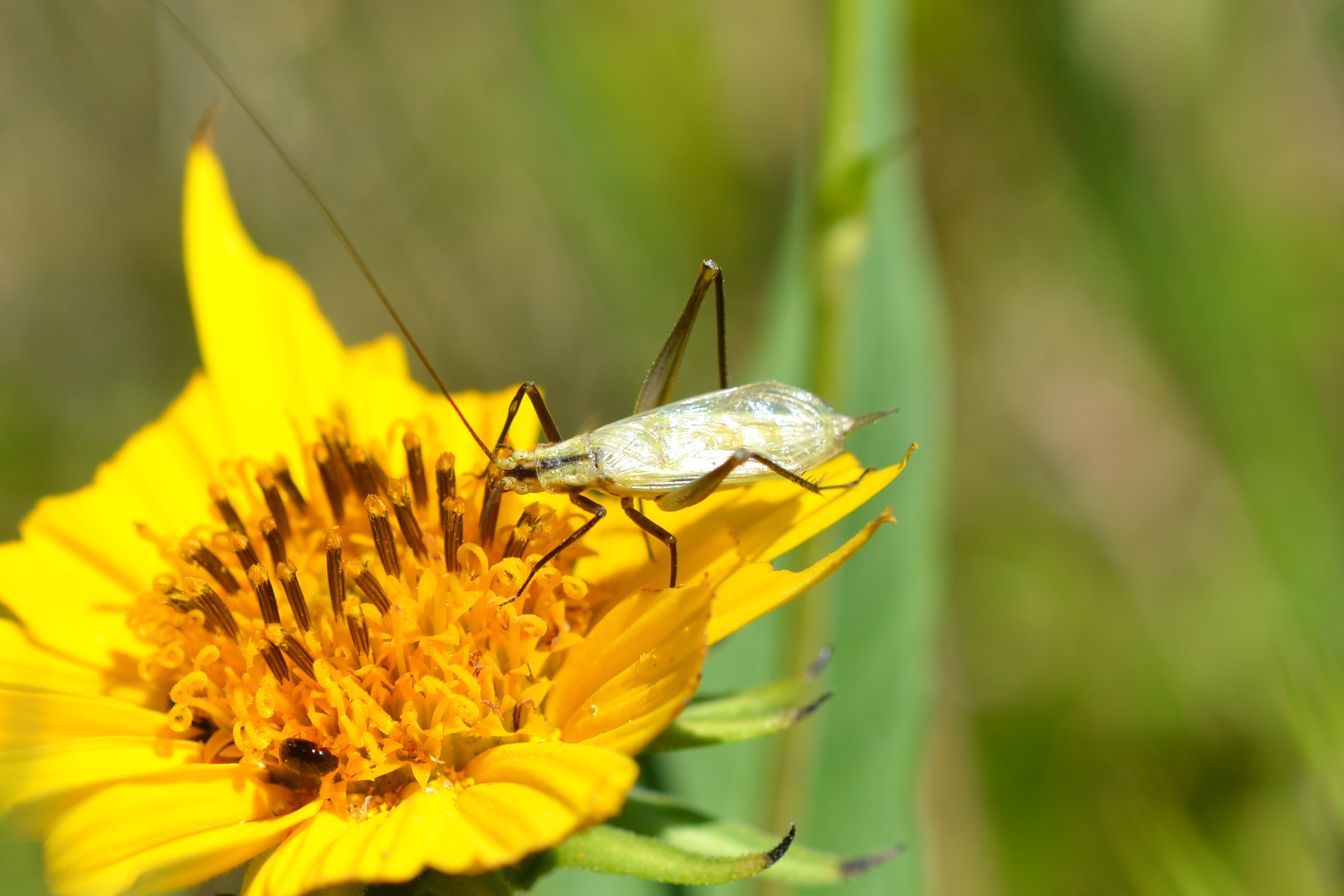

Scientific classification
- Domain: Eukaryota
- Kingdom: Animalia
- Phylum: Arthropoda
- Class: Insecta
- Order: Orthoptera
- Suborder: Ensifera
- Family: Oecanthidae
- Tribe: Oecanthini
- Genus: Oecanthus
- Species: O. nigricornis

Binomial name
- Oecanthus nigricornis Walker, F., 1869

= Oecanthus nigricornis =

Species of cricket

Oecanthus nigricornis is a "common tree cricket" in the subfamily Oecanthinae ("tree crickets"). A common name for O. nigricornis is black-horned tree cricket. It is found in North America.

Black-horned tree cricket bats away a hover fly with its antenna (replayed in slow speed). Later a cricket sings.

== Courtship feeding ==
Bell 1979 finds courtship feeding goes into increased fecundity, however Arnold and Duvall 1994 finds quantity to not be the selection criterion: Female choice has evolved to prefer mates who give the highest value nuptial gift, disregarding quantity. Variation in quality between gifts also plays a role.
