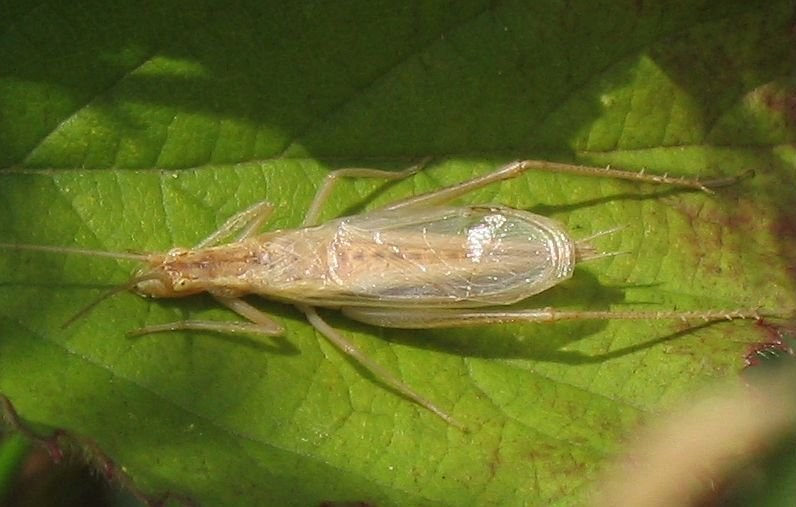
- Oecanthus pellucens

Scientific classification
- Kingdom: Animalia
- Phylum: Arthropoda
- Class: Insecta
- Order: Orthoptera
- Suborder: Ensifera
- Family: Oecanthidae
- Subfamily: Oecanthinae
- Tribe: Oecanthini
- Genus: Oecanthus; Serville, 1831

Species
- see text

= Oecanthus =

Genus of crickets

Oecanthus is a genus of cricket in subfamily Oecanthinae, the tree crickets.

== Species ==
The Orthoptera Species File lists:

- Oecanthus adyeri
- Oecanthus allardi
- Oecanthus angustus
- Oecanthus antennalis
- Oecanthus argentinus
- Oecanthus bilineatus
- Oecanthus burmeisteri
- Oecanthus californicus
- Oecanthus capensis
- Oecanthus celerinictus
- Oecanthus chopardi
- Oecanthus comma
- Oecanthus comptulus
- Oecanthus crucis
- Oecanthus decorsei
- Oecanthus dissimilis
- Oecanthus dulcisonans
- Oecanthus euryelytra
- Oecanthus exclamationis
- Oecanthus filiger
- Oecanthus flavipes
- Oecanthus forbesi
- Oecanthus fultoni
- Oecanthus galpini
- Oecanthus henryi
- Oecanthus immaculatus
- Oecanthus indicus
- Oecanthus jamaicensis
- Oecanthus karschi
- Oecanthus laricis
- Oecanthus latipennis
- Oecanthus leptogrammus
- Oecanthus lineolatus
- Oecanthus longicauda
- Oecanthus macer
- Oecanthus major
- Oecanthus mhatreae
- Oecanthus minutus
- Oecanthus nanus
- Oecanthus neofiliger
- Oecanthus neosimilis
- Oecanthus nigricornis
- Oecanthus niveus
- Oecanthus pellucens – type species (as "Acheta italica" Fabricius = O. pellucens pellucens)
- Oecanthus peruvianus
- Oecanthus pictipes
- Oecanthus pini
- Oecanthus prolatus
- Oecanthus pseudosimilis
- Oecanthus quadripunctatus
- Oecanthus rectinervis
- Oecanthus rileyi
- Oecanthus rufescens
- Oecanthus rufopictus
- Oecanthus similator
- Oecanthus similis
- Oecanthus sinensis
- Oecanthus socians
- Oecanthus sycomorus
- Oecanthus tenuis
- Oecanthus turanicus
- Oecanthus varicornis
- Oecanthus zhengi
