= Thaumatogryllus conanti =

- Artist's rendition

Scientific classification
- Kingdom: Animalia
- Phylum: Arthropoda
- Clade: Pancrustacea
- Class: Insecta
- Order: Orthoptera
- Suborder: Ensifera
- Family: Oecanthidae
- Genus: Thaumatogryllus
- Species: T. conanti

Binomial name
- Thaumatogryllus conanti D. Otte, 1994

Species of cricket

Thaumatogryllus conanti is a nocturnal species of cricket endemic to the island of Nīhoa, where it is found in Devil's Slide, a narrow ravine. It is named after Sheila Conant, the scientist who discovered it in the 1980s. Including T. conanti, there are only four known species in the genus Thaumatogryllus, which is endemic to Hawaii. Another species is found only in lava tubes on the Island of Hawaii.

Island gigantism is mostly found in plants and animals on tiny, remote islands. This is because largeness provides a survival advantage. Usually, larger size makes it harder to escape from predators, but in these cases, there are none. This insect probably lost the capacity for flight in exchange for larger size. The average length is about 4 centimetres (1.6 in).
