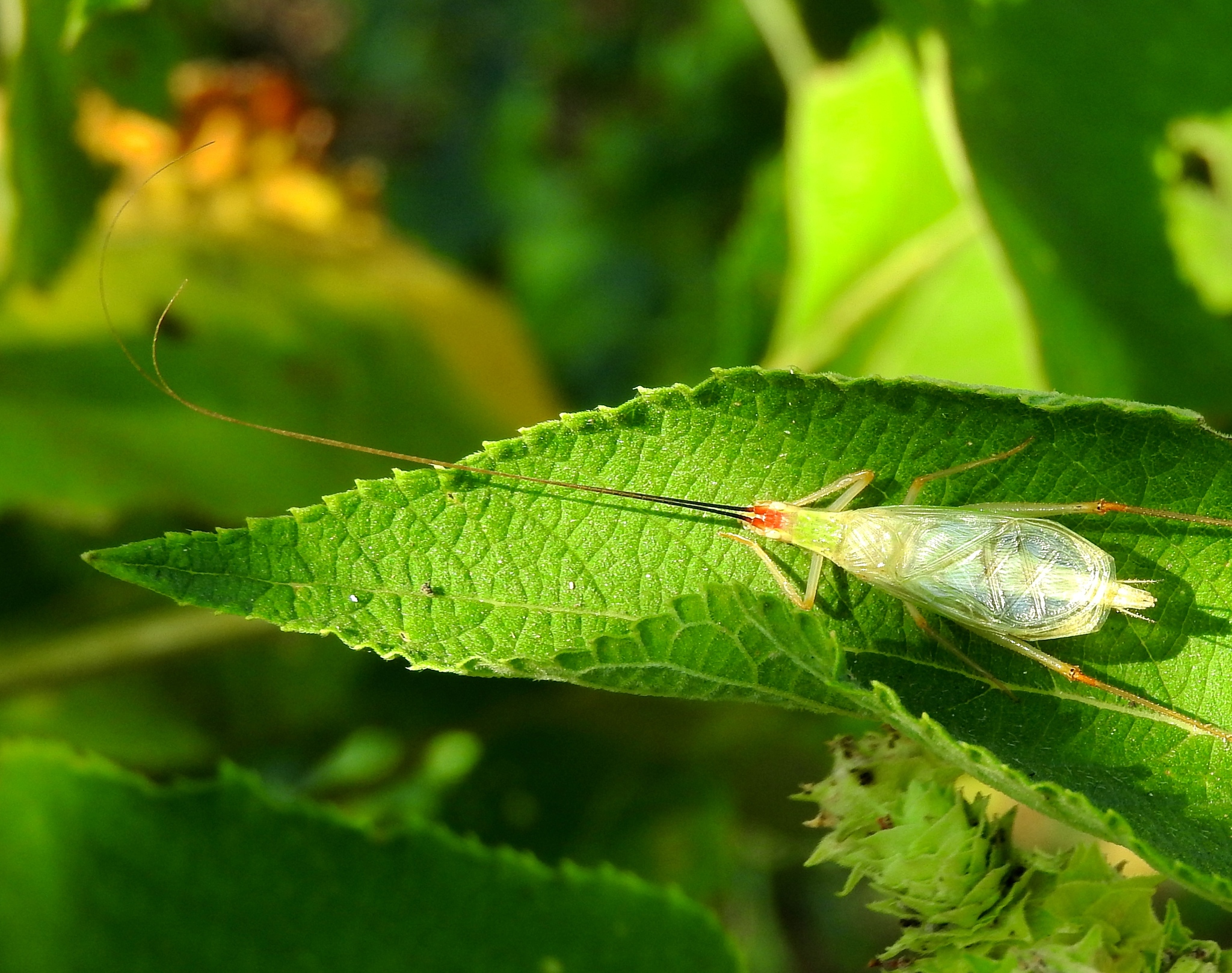

Scientific classification
- Kingdom: Animalia
- Phylum: Arthropoda
- Class: Insecta
- Order: Orthoptera
- Suborder: Ensifera
- Family: Oecanthidae
- Genus: Oecanthus
- Species: O. varicornis

Binomial name
- Oecanthus varicornis Walker, 1869

= Oecanthus varicornis =

Species of cricket

Oecanthus varicornis, the different-horned tree cricket, is a species of tree cricket in the family Oecanthidae. It was described by Francis Walker in 1869 and is found in Central and North America.
