= Xabea =

Scientific classification
- Kingdom: Animalia
- Phylum: Arthropoda
- Class: Insecta
- Order: Orthoptera
- Suborder: Ensifera
- Family: Oecanthidae
- Subfamily: Oecanthinae
- Tribe: Xabeini
- Genus: Xabea; Walker, 1869

Synonyms
- Xabeus Saussure, 1878

Genus of crickets

Xabea is a genus of crickets in the subfamily Oecanthinae and tribe Xabeini. Species can be found in Southeast Asia and Australia.

== Description ==
The original paper states that the male has: "Body smooth, shining, very slender. Head fusiform, much elongated, rather shorter than the prothorax and broader than the fore part of the latter. Eyes elongated, rather small, slightly prominent. Palpi slender, filiform; third joint much longer than the second. Antenna; very slender. Prothorax very long, attenuated in front, slightly gibbous near its hind border; sides straight. Cerci less than half the length of the abdomen. Legs very slender, very minutely pubescent; hind femora not inciassated; hind tibiae unarmed; tarsi three-jointed; second joint extremely short; third nearly half the length of the first; claws very small. Fine wings very broad, extending much beyond the abdomen, not reticulated; tympanum very large. Hind wings extending much beyond the fore wings."

== Species ==
Xabea includes the following species:

- Xabea atalaia Otte & Alexander, 1983
- Xabea decora Walker, 1869 - type species
- Xabea elderra Otte & Alexander, 1983
- Xabea furcata Chopard, 1927
- Xabea inermis Chopard, 1930
- Xabea latipennis Chopard, 1969
- Xabea leai Chopard, 1951
- Xabea levissima Gorochov, 1992
- Xabea maculata Chopard, 1930
- Xabea podoscirtoides Chopard, 1951
- Xabea recticercis Chopard, 1969
- Xabea tumbarumba Otte & Alexander, 1983
- Xabea wyebo Otte & Alexander, 1983
- Xabea zonata Chopard, 1969
