= Oecanthus rileyi =

Scientific classification
- Kingdom: Animalia
- Phylum: Arthropoda
- Class: Insecta
- Order: Orthoptera
- Suborder: Ensifera
- Family: Oecanthidae
- Tribe: Oecanthini
- Genus: Oecanthus
- Species: O. rileyi

Binomial name
- Oecanthus rileyi Baker, 1905

Species of cricket

Oecanthus rileyi, known generally as the Riley's tree cricket or pine tree cricket, is a species of tree cricket in the family Oecanthidae. It is found in North America.
