= Leptogryllus deceptor =

Conservation status
- Extinct in the Wild (IUCN 2.3)

Scientific classification
- Kingdom: Animalia
- Phylum: Arthropoda
- Clade: Pancrustacea
- Class: Insecta
- Order: Orthoptera
- Suborder: Ensifera
- Family: Oecanthidae
- Genus: Leptogryllus
- Species: L. deceptor

Binomial name
- Leptogryllus deceptor Perkins, 1910

Species of cricket

Leptogryllus deceptor, the Oʻahu deceptor bush cricket, is a species of cricket in the family Gryllidae. It was endemic to the Pacific island state of Hawaii in the United States. It is considered extinct in the wild according to the International Union for Conservation of Nature.
