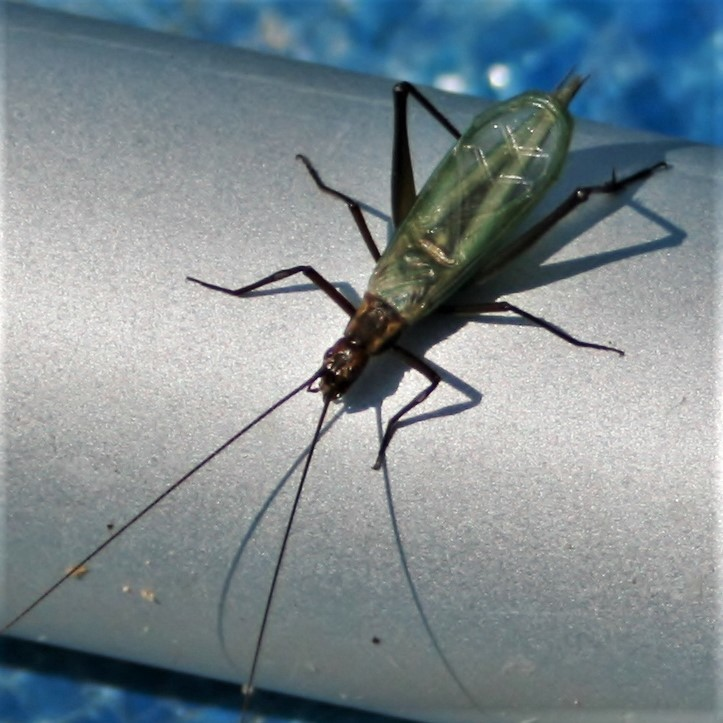

Conservation status
- Endangered (IUCN 2.3)

Scientific classification
- Kingdom: Animalia
- Phylum: Arthropoda
- Class: Insecta
- Order: Orthoptera
- Suborder: Ensifera
- Family: Oecanthidae
- Genus: Oecanthus
- Species: O. laricis

Binomial name
- Oecanthus laricis Walker, 1963

= Oecanthus laricis =

Species of cricket

Oecanthus laricis, the laricis tree cricket or tamarack tree cricket, is a species of cricket endemic to the Great Lakes region in the Midwestern United States and Ontario, Canada.

Individuals range from 13–15 mm (0.51–0.59 in) in length with green forewings. It produces one generation annually.
