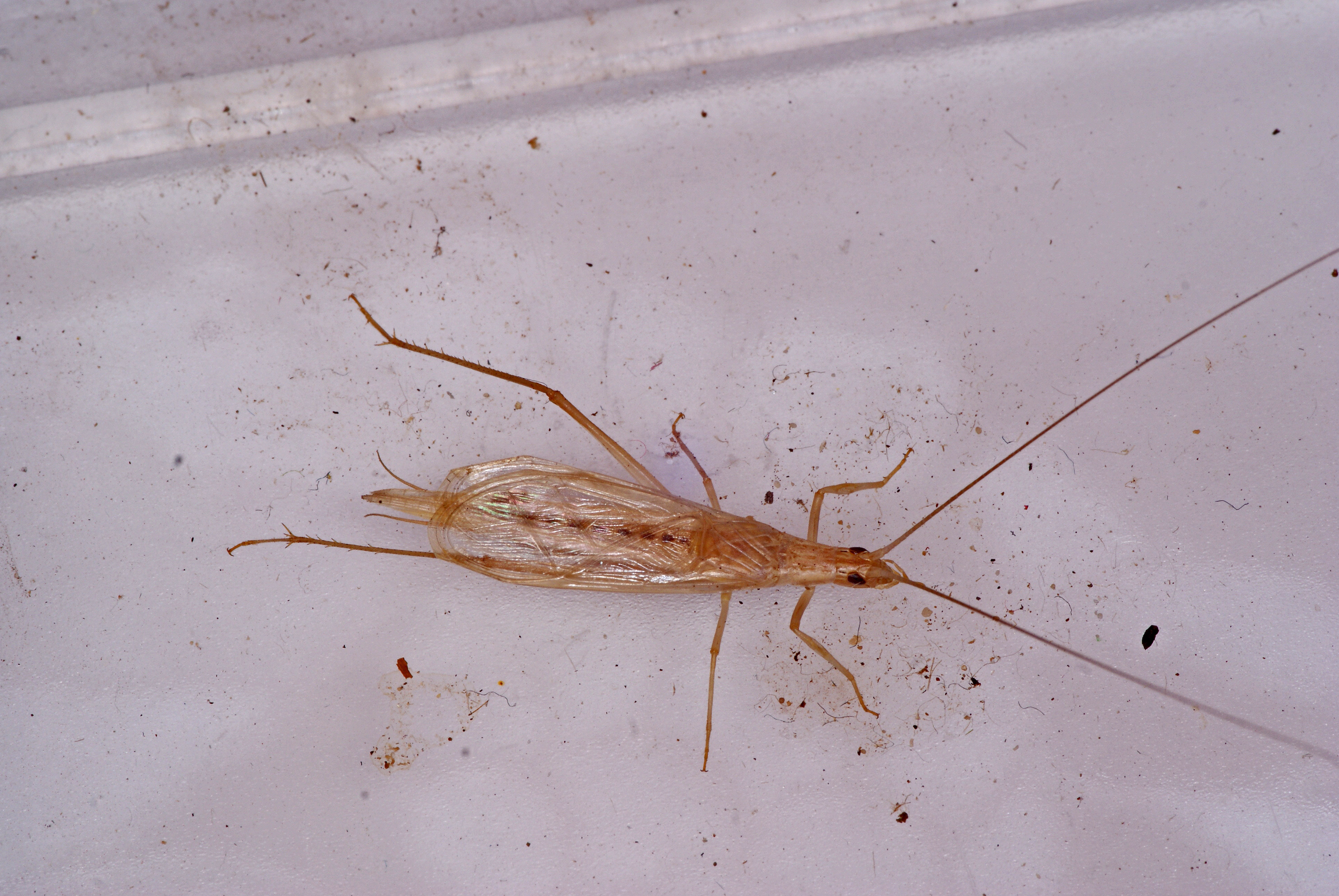
- O. dulcisonans, male

Scientific classification
- Kingdom: Animalia
- Phylum: Arthropoda
- Class: Insecta
- Order: Orthoptera
- Suborder: Ensifera
- Family: Oecanthidae
- Genus: Oecanthus
- Species: O. dulcisonans

Binomial name
- Oecanthus dulcisonans Gorochov, 1993

= Oecanthus dulcisonans =

Species of cricket

Stridulation

Oecanthus dulcisonans is a species of cricket sparsely but widely distributed in the Mediterranean Basin and in the Middle East.

== Distribution and habitat ==
The species can be found in several Thyrrhenian coastal regions of Italy, as well as in Sardinia and Sicily. O. dulcisonans was originally reported from Saudi Arabia and is present also in the Canary Islands.

In the Mediterranean area, its range overlaps that of its congener O. pellucens. According to some studies, O. dulcisonans sings preferentially from trees while O. pellucens seems to prefer high grass such as the vegetation growing along the small streams.

This thermophilic and heliophilic species is not particularly demanding, and can be found both in wet and in xeric environments.

== Description ==
The adult males grow up to 13–15 millimetres (0.51–0.59 in) long, while females reach 14–16 millimetres (0.55–0.63 in). The overall color is yellowish. Long forewings cover entirely the abdomen, hind wings are decidedly longer. It can be distinguished from O. pellucens by its bigger size, by the different shape of the sternal plate, and by the male genitalia. The morphological differences were investigated by Cordero et al.

Its namesake song is among the most useful characters to recognize O. dulcisonans form O. pellucens: the strong and melodious trill of the former is continuous, as opposed to the equal, discrete 0.5sec - 1sec trills of O. pellucens. Furthermore, peak frequency by O. dulcisonans is slightly higher. Both species are difficult to locate by the unaided ear: the insect can vary the elevation of the forewings making difficult to identify the provenance of the sound, reverberated by the high grass or by the reeds.

== Biology ==
O. dulcisonans is omnivorous but mainly zoophagous, and is more active at night. Adults appear in July / August and their song can be heard until early autumn. Eggs are deposed into the stem of various herbaceous plants.

Its shape and color make captures difficult, but it can be attracted to artificial light.

This species is most probably underrecorded due to its elusiveness and its similarity with O. pellucens.

== Gallery ==
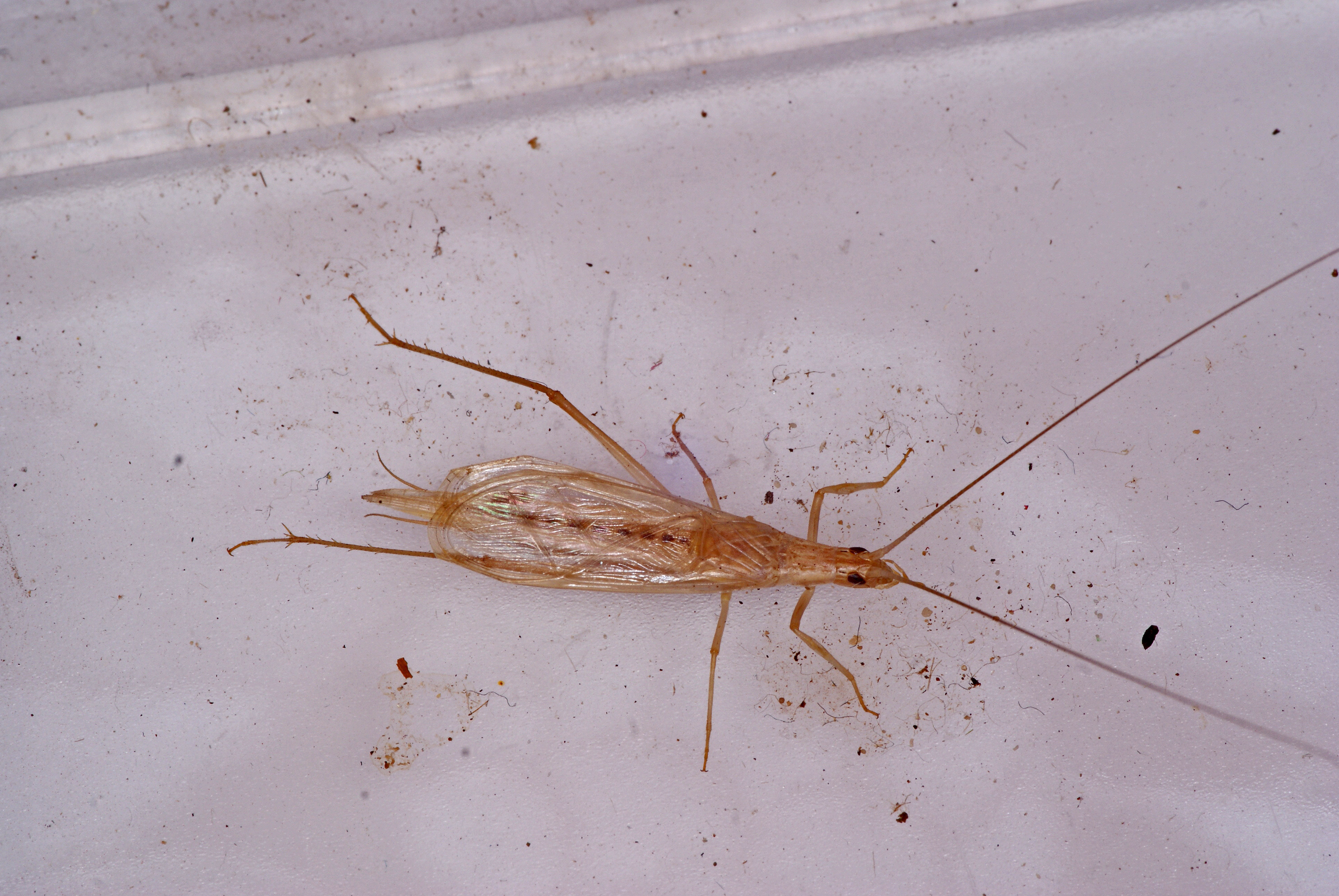
A specimen collected in Fluminimaggiore, Sardinia on 17 August 2013

== Bibliography ==
- Brizio, C. & Buzzetti F.M. 2014. Biodiversity Journal, 2014, 5 (1): 25–38 >> Ultrasound recordings of some Orthoptera from Sardinia (Italy)
- Gorochov [Ed.]. 1993. Fauna of Saudi Arabia 13:90 – urn:lsid:Orthoptera.speciesfile.org:TaxonName:26112
- Ingrisch. 1999. Esperiana 7:352 >> Orthopteroid insects of Yemen –
- Schmidt G.H. & Herrmann M., 2000. Boll. Soc. Sarda Sci. Nat.,32: 83-128. >> Occurrence and distribution of Orthopteroidea, Blattoptera, Mantodea, Phasmodea and Dermaptera in Sardinia/Italy.
