= Dolbear's law =

Relation between temperature and cricket chirping

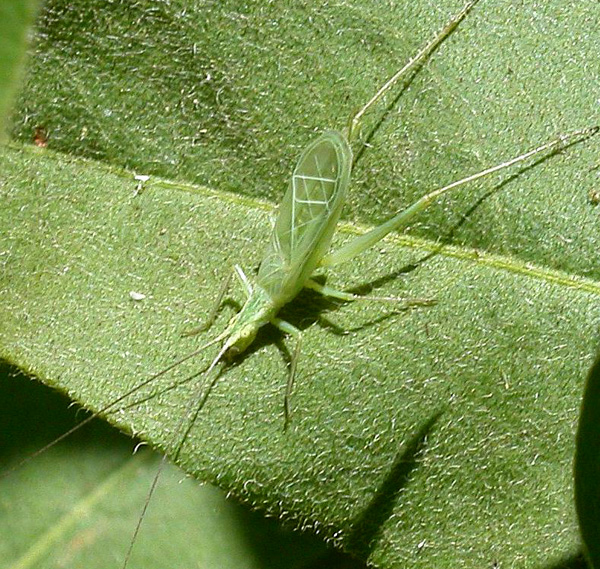
The tree cricket Oecanthus fultoni

Dolbear's law states the relationship between the air temperature and the rate at which crickets chirp. It was formulated by physicist Amos Dolbear and published in 1897 in an article called "The Cricket as a Thermometer". Dolbear's observations on the relation between chirp rate and temperature were preceded by an 1881 report by Margarette W. Brooks, of Salem, Massachusetts, in her letter to the Editor of Popular Science Monthly — although, it seems, Dolbear knew nothing of Brooks' earlier letter until after his article was published in 1897.

Dolbear did not specify the species of cricket which he observed, although subsequent researchers assumed it to be the snowy tree cricket, Oecanthus niveus. However, the snowy tree cricket was misidentified as O. niveus in early reports and the correct scientific name for this species is Oecanthus fultoni.

The chirping of the more common field crickets is not as reliably correlated to temperature—their chirping rate varies depending on other factors such as age and mating success.

Dolbear expressed the relationship as the following formula which provides a way to estimate the temperature T_{F} in degrees Fahrenheit from the number of chirps per minute N_{60}:

$$T_F = 50 + \left ( \frac{N_{60}-40}{4} \right ).$$

This formula is accurate to within a degree or so when applied to the chirping of the field cricket.

Counting can be sped up by simplifying the formula and counting the number of chirps produced in 15 seconds (N_{15}):

$$\,T_F = 40 + N_{15}$$

Reformulated to give the temperature in degrees Celsius (°C), it is:

$$T_C = \frac{N_{60}+30}{7}$$

A shortcut method for degrees Celsius is to count the number of chirps in 8 seconds (N_{8}) and add 5 (this is fairly accurate between 5 and 30 °C):

$$\,T_C = 5 + N_{8}$$

The above formulae are expressed in terms of integers to make them easier to remember—they are not intended to be exact.

== In math classes ==
Math textbooks will sometimes cite this as a simple example of where mathematical models break down, because at temperatures outside of the range that crickets live in, the total of chirps is zero as the crickets are dead. You can apply algebra to the equation and see that according to the model at 1,000 degrees Celsius (around 1,800 degrees Fahrenheit) crickets should be chirping at 6,970 chirps per minute (around 116 chirps per second), but no known cricket can live at that temperature to chirp.

== In popular culture ==
This formula was referenced in an episode (Season 3, Episode 2, "The Jiminy Conjecture") of the American TV sitcom The Big Bang Theory (although Sheldon referred to Amos Dolbear as Emile Dolbear and gave the year of publication as 1890). It is also referenced in two episodes ("Highs and Lows", "Jungles") of the British comedy show QI. Richard Powers, author of the Pulitzer Prize-winning The Overstory (2018, W.W. Norton & Co.), has his fictional character Patricia Westerman use the formula (chapter 11. Pg 436).

== See also ==
- Arrhenius equation – Formula for temperature dependence of rates of chemical reactions
