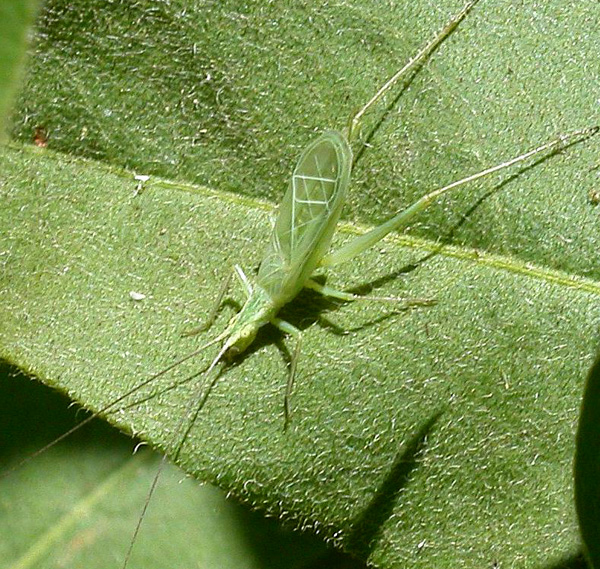
- Snowy tree cricket, Oecanthus fultoni

Scientific classification
- Kingdom: Animalia
- Phylum: Arthropoda
- Clade: Pancrustacea
- Class: Insecta
- Order: Orthoptera
- Suborder: Ensifera
- Family: Oecanthidae
- Subfamily: Oecanthinae; Blanchard, 1845

Tribes
- Diatrypidi (= Diatrypini); Oecanthini; Xabeini

= Tree cricket =

Subfamily of crickets

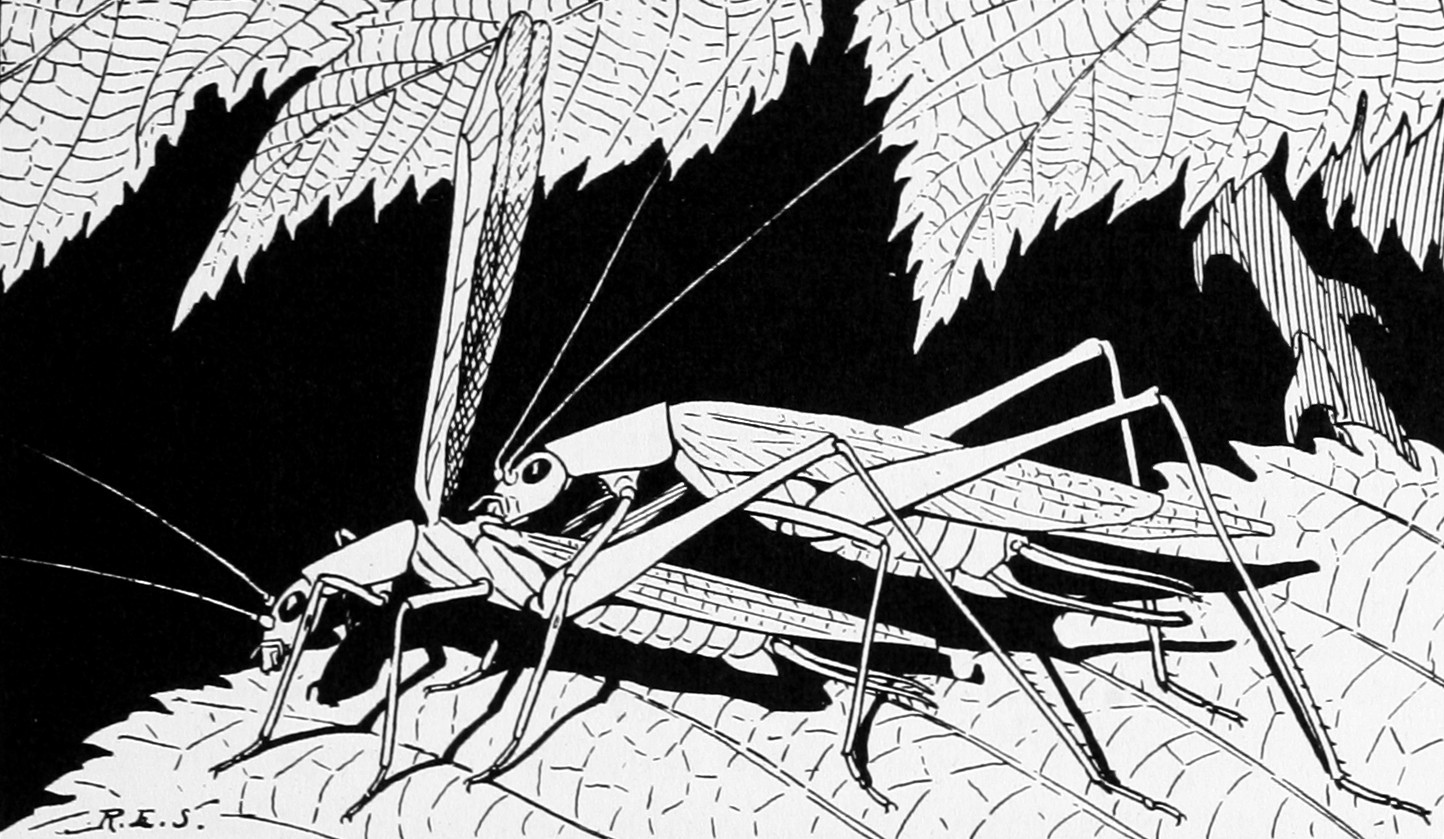
Illustration of Oecanthus niveus, the narrow-winged tree cricket

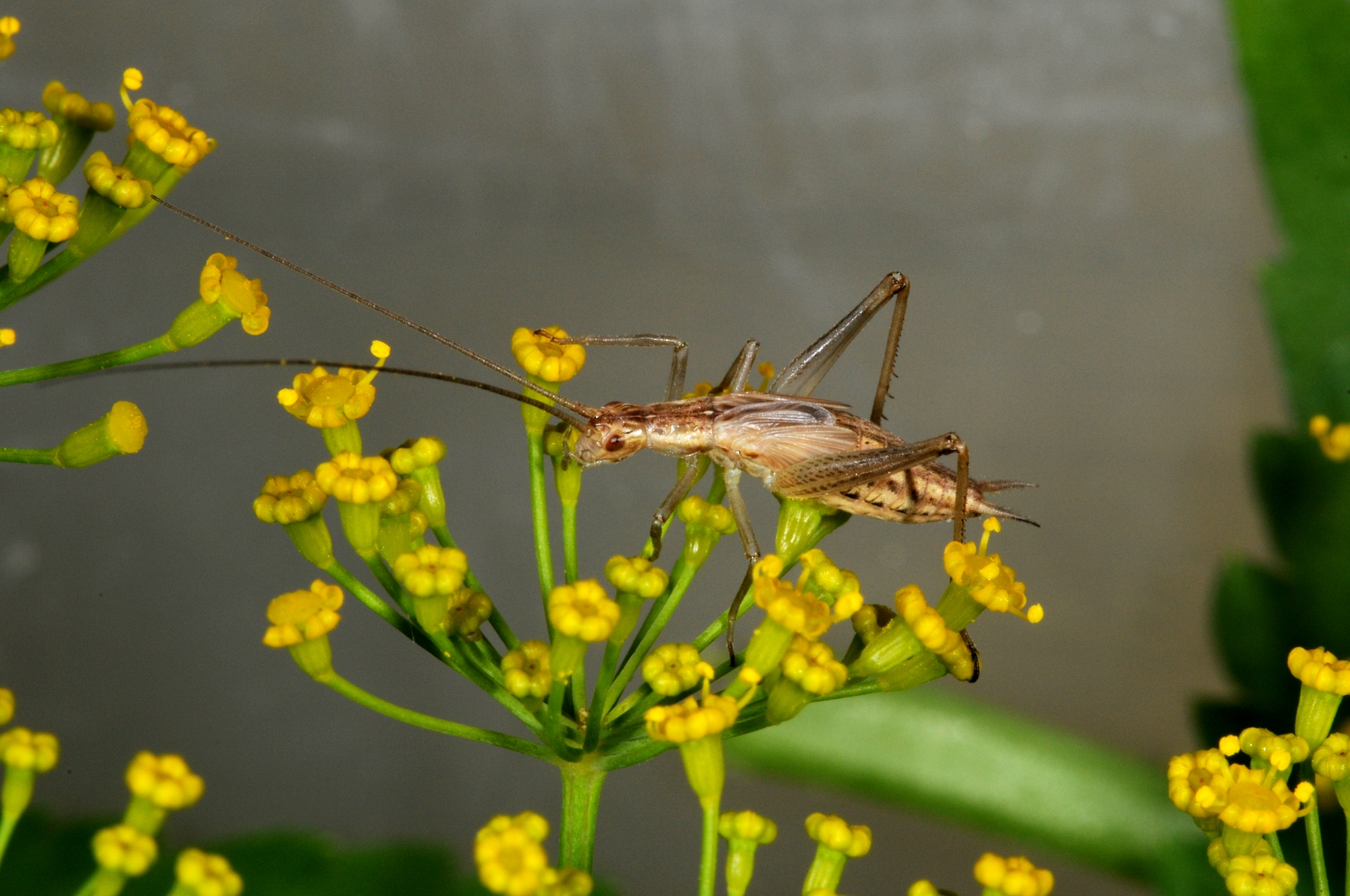
Oecanthus pellucens

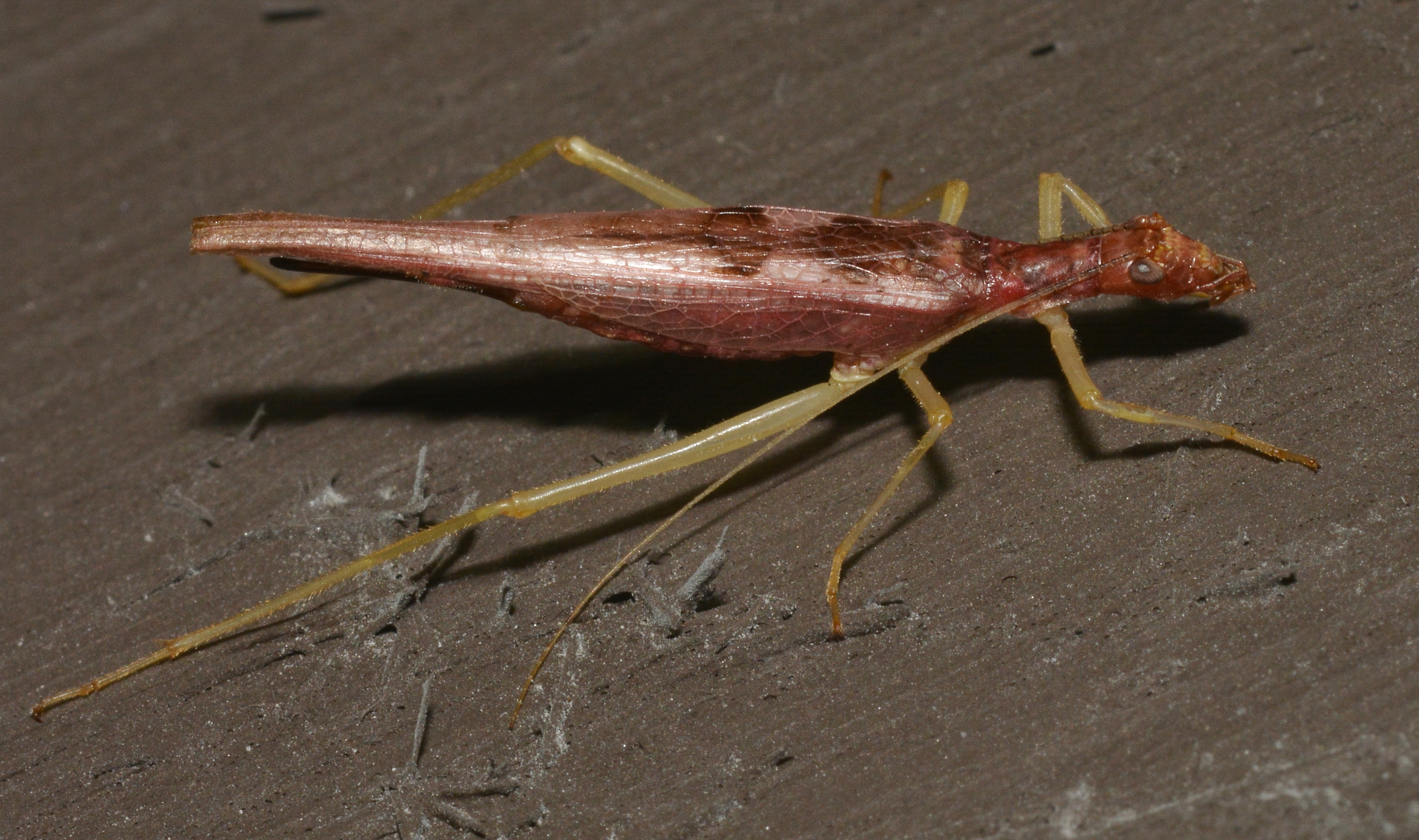
Neoxabea bipunctata

Cricket sound

Tree crickets are insects of the order Orthoptera. These crickets belong to the Oecanthinae, one of the subfamilies of the recently (2022) restored family Oecanthidae.

== Description ==
Tree crickets as well as most other crickets have two pairs of wings. The fore wings are located closer to the head and are hard and leathery in appearance. The hind wings are located aft of the fore wings and are the wings it uses for flight. When the cricket is not in flight the fore wings fold back to cover the hind wings. The bodies of tree crickets are long and skinny with a coloration that matches their habitat. They have large powerful legs used for jumping. Their heads contain two antennae which can sense both touch and odor and compound eyes which are inherent in all Orthoptera.

== Distribution and habitat ==
They live in trees and shrubs, for which they are well camouflaged. These crickets are nocturnal and can be found on every continent except Antarctica.

In Europe, tree crickets have been expanding northwards and had reached the island of Jersey in the Channel Islands by 2010. In August 2015, the first population was found in mainland England at Dungeness in Kent, where hundreds of males were present.

== Tribes and genera ==
Three tribes (in two supertribes) are currently (2024) recognised:

supertribe Diatrypidi Desutter-Grandcolas, 1988

1. monotypic genus Diatrypa Saussure, 1874 - South America

supertribe Oecanthidi Blanchard, 1845

=== Oecanthini ===
Auth.: Blanchard, 1845

1. Oecanthodes Toms & Otte, 1988 - E. Africa
2. Oecanthus Serville, 1831 - worldwide (not cold climates)
3. Viphyus Otte, 1988 - sub-Saharan Africa

=== Xabeini ===
Auth.: Vickery & Kevan, 1983

- genus group Prognathogryllus Zimmerman, 1948
1. Leptogryllus Perkins, 1899
2. Prognathogryllus Zimmerman, 1948
3. Thaumatogryllus Perkins, 1899
- genus group Xabea Walker, 1869
1. Neoxabea Kirby, 1906
2. Xabea Walker, 1869

incertae sedis

1. †Apiculatus Yuan, Ma & Gu, 2022 - †A. cretaceus
2. †Birmanioecanthus Yuan, Ma & Gu, 2022 - †B. haplostichus
3. Paraphasius Chopard, 1927 - monotypic P. lepturoides

not placed in any supertribe or tribe

1. †Crassicorpus Zheng, Yuan & Gu, 2023
2. Stenoecanthus Chopard, 1912

== Communication ==
A tree cricket chirping, Alameda County California.

Like other species of cricket they produce their calling song by rubbing the ridges of their wings together. The chirp (or trill) of a tree cricket is long and continuous and can sometimes be mistaken for the call of a cicada or certain species of frogs. While male tree crickets have the ability to call, females lack the ability. This call is then received by other tree crickets in the area through a system called sender-receiver matching. For example, a male tree cricket will produce a mating call at a specific range of frequencies. This allows females to be able to pick out the males mating call without becoming distracted or confused by other calls from other species of insects. This range of frequencies is called a carrier frequency. Tree crickets are unique in the way they use carrier frequencies because the range of frequencies changes according to the temperature. Due to this, female tree crickets have tympanum (hearing organs) that can receive a much wider range of frequencies than most other insects. Female tree crickets seem to prefer calls at the lower range of frequencies indicating the presence of a large male. This preference for larger males could be because larger males produce a greater amount of sperm thus increasing the females chances of offspring. Some male tree crickets produce a sound that is too quiet to be audible; they amplify their mating call by making a "megaphone" type structure from tree leaves.

== Diet ==
Tree crickets are omnivorous, and are known to feed on plant parts, other insects such as Sternorrhyncha, and even fungi.

== Mating ==
Tree crickets exhibit a behavior called courtship feeding. Shortly after copulation the male tree cricket secretes a fluid from the metanotal gland located between its wings in the thoracic cavity. This fluid provides the female with nutrients that help to increase the chances of reproduction. Female tree crickets have even been known to steal this fluid from a mating pair during copulation or finish consuming the fluid if the first female dismounts and leaves. After mating a male cannot mate again for 30 to 60 min, allowing the production of another spermatophore. Eggs are laid in the fall, in a series of small holes drilled into the bark. After remaining dormant for the winter, the eggs hatch in the spring and the young tree crickets begin feeding on aphids. They may go through as many as twelve molts before reaching maturity around mid summer.

== Cultural associations ==
The snowy tree cricket (Oecanthus fultoni) is known for having a chirping rate highly correlated with ambient temperature. This relationship is known as Dolbear's law.
