= Pergusa (disambiguation) =

Pergusa may refer to:

- Pergusa, an Italian village of Sicily
- Pergusa Lake, lake in Sicily
- Autodromo di Pergusa, automobile and motorcycle circuit in Sicily
