= Zamunda =

Scientific classification
- Kingdom: Animalia
- Phylum: Arthropoda
- Class: Insecta
- Order: Orthoptera
- Suborder: Ensifera
- Family: Oecanthidae
- Subfamily: Podoscirtinae
- Tribe: Aphonoidini
- Genus: Zamunda; Gorochov, 2007

Genus of crickets

Zamunda is a genus of crickets in the subfamily Podoscirtinae and tribe Aphonoidini. Species have been found in southern China and peninsular Malaysia (known distribution may be incomplete).

== Species ==
Zamunda includes the following species:

- Zamunda fuscirostris (Chopard, 1969) – type species (as Aphonoides fuscirostris Chopard)
- Zamunda humeralis Gorochov, 2007

== Fictitious Use ==
Zamunda is the name of the sub-Saharan African nation where Eddie Murphy's character, crown prince Akeem Joffer, is from in the 1988 film Coming to America. There is no such nation in sub-Saharan Africa.
