= Zoppo di Gangi =

Zoppo di Gangi or the Cripple from the town of Gangi, Sicily may refer to one of two painters:

- Gaspare Vazzano or Bazzano (1562–1630)
- Giuseppe Salerno (1588–1630), who was Vazzano's pupil and was more prolific.
