= Plain of Catania =

Coordinates: 37.5000°N 15.0800°E

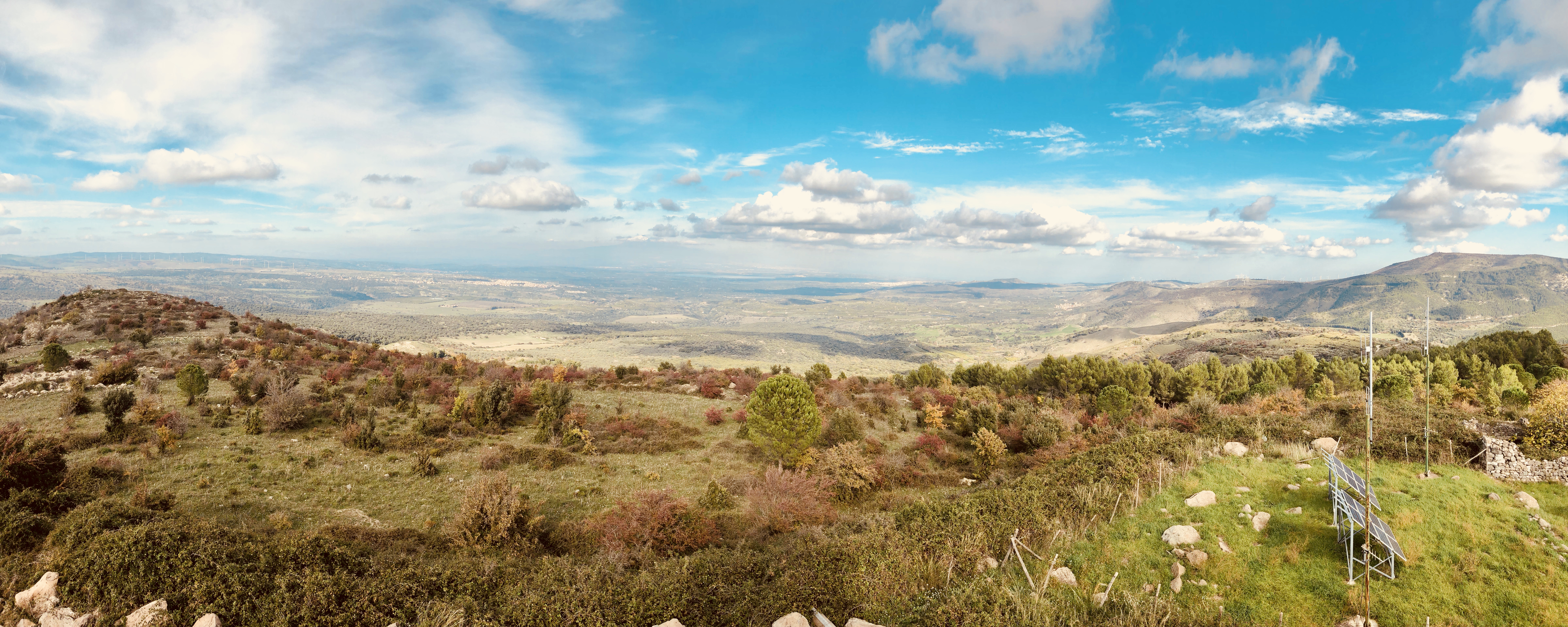
The plain as seen from the Hyblaean Mountains

The Plain of Catania (Sicilian: Chiana di Catania; Italian: Piana di Catania) is the most extensive and most important plain in Sicily, Italy. It is surrounded by Mount Etna and the Nebrodi range to the north, the Erean and Hyblaean Mountains to the southwest, and the Ionian Sea to the east. The plain is named after Catania, the largest city and the main hub of the area.

== See also ==
- Metropolitan City of Catania
- Province of Enna
- Province of Syracuse
