= Phyllotrella =

Scientific classification
- Domain: Eukaryota
- Kingdom: Animalia
- Phylum: Arthropoda
- Class: Insecta
- Order: Orthoptera
- Suborder: Ensifera
- Family: Oecanthidae
- Subfamily: Podoscirtinae
- Tribe: Podoscirtini
- Genus: Phyllotrella; Gorochov, 1988

Genus of crickets

External image
- Image at iNaturalist

Phyllotrella is a genus of Asian crickets in the tribe Podoscirtini, erected by Andrey Gorochov in 1988. Species have been recorded from eastern China and Vietnam.

== Species ==
The Orthoptera Species File includes the following species:

1. Phyllotrella fumingi Sun & Liu, 2019
2. Phyllotrella hainanensis Sun & Liu, 2019
3. Phyllotrella planidorsalis Gorochov, 1988 - type species
4. Phyllotrella transversa Sun & Liu, 2019
