= Trelleora =

Scientific classification
- Domain: Eukaryota
- Kingdom: Animalia
- Phylum: Arthropoda
- Class: Insecta
- Order: Orthoptera
- Suborder: Ensifera
- Family: Oecanthidae
- Subfamily: Podoscirtinae
- Tribe: Podoscirtini
- Genus: Trelleora; Gorochov, 1988

Genus of crickets

External image
- Images at iNaturalist

Trelleora is a genus of Asian crickets in the tribe Podoscirtini, erected by Andrey Gorochov in 1988. Species have been recorded in: India, southern China and Indochina.

== Species ==
The Orthoptera Species File includes the following species:

- Trelleora consimilis Gorochov, 2003
- Trelleora fumosa Gorochov, 1988
- Trelleora gravelyi (Chopard, 1928)
- Trelleora kryszhanovskiji Gorochov, 1988 - type species
- Trelleora sonlensis Gorochov, 1988
- Trelleora suthepa Ingrisch, 1997
