= San Francesco d'Assisi, Enna =

Baroque Roman Catholic church

Coordinates: 37.°N 14.°E

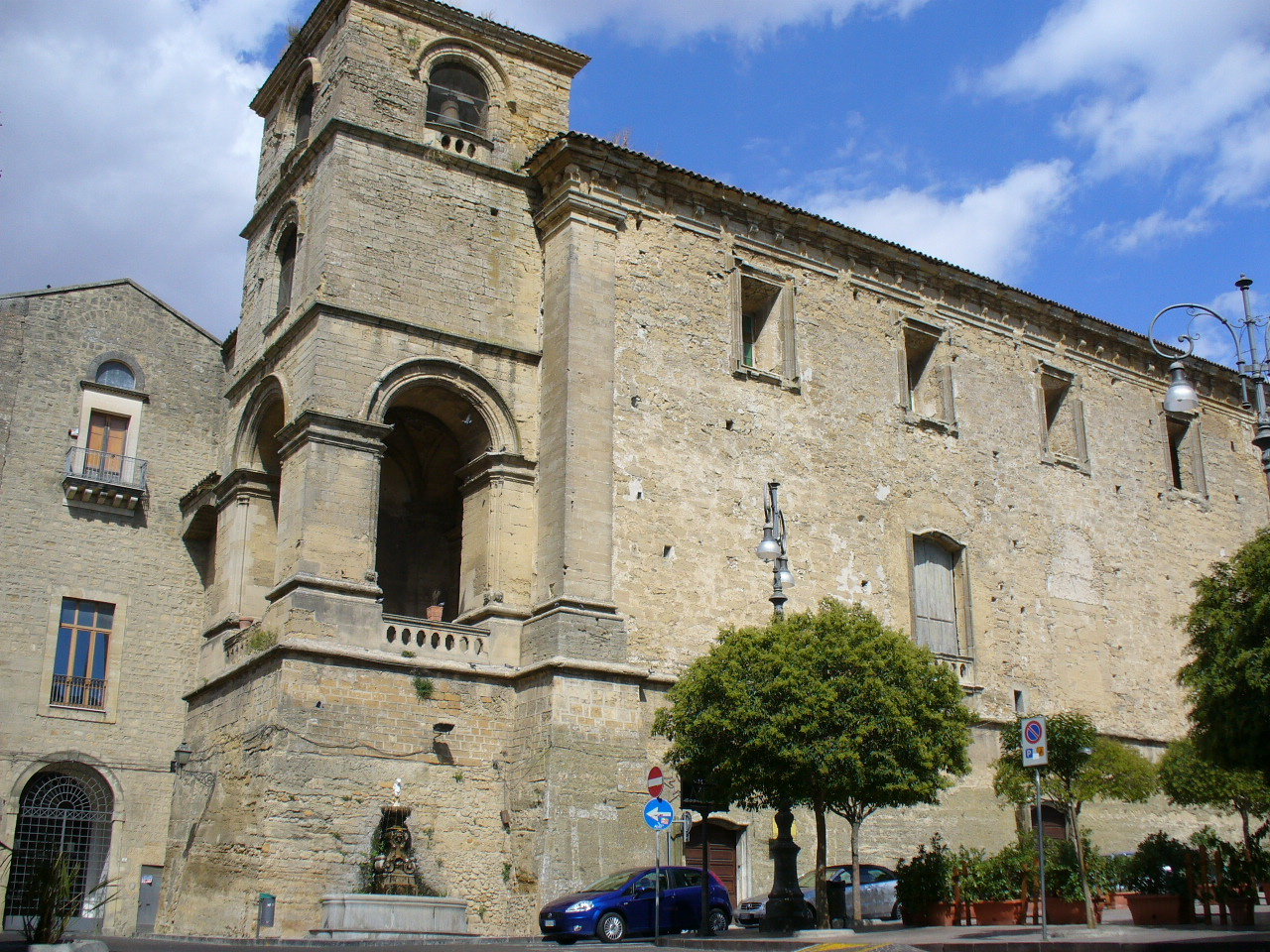
Facade of church

San Francesco d'Assisi (St Francis of Assisi) is the Roman Catholic church and adjacent convent in the town of Enna, in the region of Sicily, Italy.

== History and description ==
The church was erected at the site, and incorporating part of the former 14th-century Palazzo Chiaramonte. King Martin of Aragon had captured the palace from Giovanni degli Ubertis, and donated to the Conventual Franciscans, or Minorites. By 1394, they had adapted the palace into a convent and built this church with its tall bell-tower. The facade has Gothic-style windows. The interior has a single nave with three side altars on each side.

The first altarpiece on the left depicts an Adoration of the Magi by Simone de Wobreck. The apse was frescoed by Giovanni Battista Bruno with scenes from the Life of Saint Anthony of Padua. The wooden choir was built in the 17th century. The apse painted crucifix is attributed to Pietro Ruzzolone. In the transept are a Nativity and Assumption of the Virgin painted by Francesco Ciotti. Below the church is a burial crypt.
