= Idiotrella =

Scientific classification
- Kingdom: Animalia
- Phylum: Arthropoda
- Clade: Pancrustacea
- Class: Insecta
- Order: Orthoptera
- Suborder: Ensifera
- Family: Oecanthidae
- Subfamily: Podoscirtinae
- Tribe: Podoscirtini
- Genus: Idiotrella; Gorochov, 2002

Genus of crickets

Idiotrella is a genus of crickets in the tribe Podoscirtini, erected by A.V. Gorochov in 2002; (note: it had originally been placed in the subfamily Hapithinae). Species have been recorded from Indo-China and West Malesia including Borneo.

== Species ==
The Orthoptera Species File lists:

1. Idiotrella coomani (Chopard, 1939) - Vietnam
2. Idiotrella javae Gorochov, 2002 – type species
3. Idiotrella karnyi (Chopard, 1929)
4. Idiotrella malaccae Gorochov, 2002
5. Idiotrella pachyonyx (Chopard, 1930)
