= San Giuseppe, Enna =

Catholic church in Enna, Italy

{{coord|37|34|1.02|N|14|16|46.49|E}}

San Giuseppe or St Joseph is a Roman Catholic church located in the town of Enna in Sicily, Italy.

== History ==
The church and adjacent monastery were initially built in 1390, but underwent a reconstruction during the 17th century. The facade now has a Baroque portal. The Nave houses a number of paintings including depictions of Santa Scolastica, St Benedict, and a Madonna of the Rosary. It houses a statue of the Madonna del Carmelo and a 15th-century crucifix. The nave has a Deposition by Antonio Mercurio, and a 17th-century carved statues of the Holy Family by a sculptor of the name Greca, paraded in procession every March 19, the saint day of St Joseph. The Sacristy has a Last Supper on canvas derived from a local Benedictine monastery. while the church is still assigned to the Confraternity of San Giuseppe, the monastery since 1955 is attached to an order of Discalced Carmelite priests. In 1965, the church was made a Sanctuary.
