= Zvenella =

Scientific classification
- Domain: Eukaryota
- Kingdom: Animalia
- Phylum: Arthropoda
- Class: Insecta
- Order: Orthoptera
- Suborder: Ensifera
- Family: Oecanthidae
- Subfamily: Podoscirtinae
- Tribe: Podoscirtini
- Genus: Zvenella; Gorochov, 1988

Synonyms
- Svenella Otte, 1994

Genus of crickets

External image
- Images at iNaturalist

Zvenella is a genus of crickets in the tribe Podoscirtini. Species have been recorded in: southern China, Indochina and Sumatra.

== Species ==
The Orthoptera Species File includes the following species:

species group Group I (temporary name)

- Zvenella acutangulata Xia, Liu & Yin, 1991
- Zvenella aequalis Ma & Zhang, 2012
- Zvenella chopardi Gorochov, 2002
- Zvenella cognata Gorochov, 1992
- Zvenella decussatus Ma & Zhang, 2012
- Zvenella geniculata (Chopard, 1931)
- Zvenella modesta Gorochov, 2002
- Zvenella pulchella Gorochov, 1988
- Zvenella scalpratus Ma & Zhang, 2012
- Zvenella transversa Ingrisch, 1997
- Zvenella yunnana (Gorochov, 1985) - type species (as Madasumma yunnana Gorochov)

species group Group II (temporary name)

- Zvenella albomaculata (Chopard, 1969)
- Zvenella malayana Gorochov, 2002
- Zvenella taynguyena Gorochov, 1990

species group Group III (temporary name)

- Zvenella parcevenosa (Chopard, 1931)
- Zvenella reticulata Gorochov, 2002
