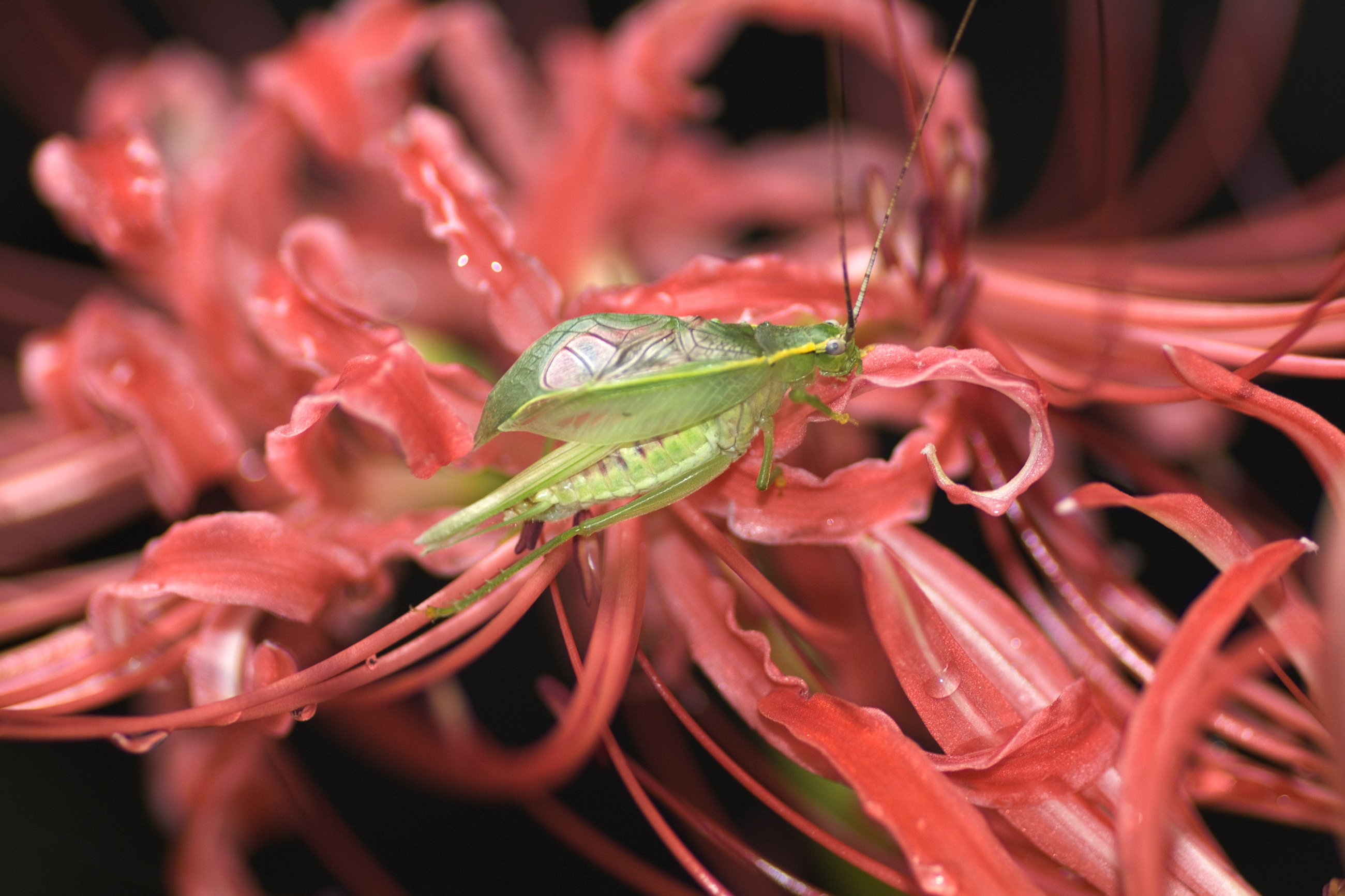
- T. hibinonis male
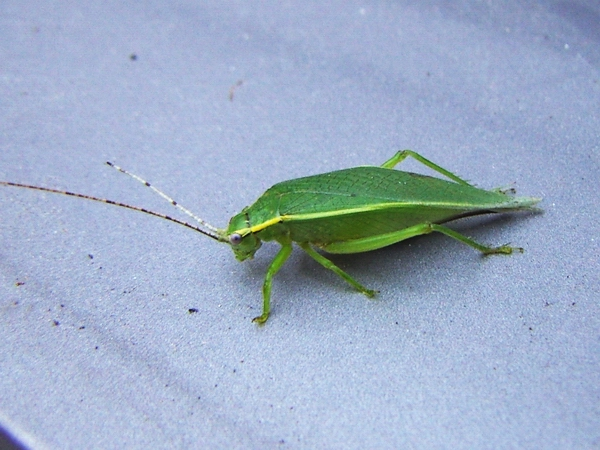
- T. hibinonis female

Scientific classification
- Domain: Eukaryota
- Kingdom: Animalia
- Phylum: Arthropoda
- Class: Insecta
- Order: Orthoptera
- Suborder: Ensifera
- Family: Oecanthidae
- Subfamily: Podoscirtinae
- Tribe: Truljaliini
- Genus: Truljalia; Gorochov, 1985

Synonyms
- Truljala Ingrisch, 1997

= Truljalia =

Genus of crickets

Truljalia is a genus of crickets in the subfamily Podoscirtinae and tribe Truljaliini. Species have been recorded in: India, southern China, Korea, Japan, Indo-China and west Malesia.

== Species ==
Truljalia includes the following species:

- Truljalia bispinosa Wang & Woo, 1992
- Truljalia citri (Bey-Bienko, 1956) – type species (as Calyptotrypus citri Bey-Bienko)
- Truljalia elongata Liu & Shi, 2012
- Truljalia forceps Saussure, 1878
- Truljalia formosa He, 2012
- Truljalia hibinonis (Matsumura, 1917)
- Truljalia hofmanni (Saussure, 1878)
- Truljalia hubeiensis Ma & Zhang, 2015
- Truljalia lata Ingrisch, 2002
- Truljalia meloda Gorochov, 1992
- Truljalia multiprotubera Liu & Shi, 2011
- Truljalia ornata (Chopard, 1969)
- Truljalia panda Ma & Zhang, 2015
- Truljalia parvispinosa (Chopard, 1930)
- Truljalia tylacantha Wang & Woo, 1992
- Truljalia versicolor Ingrisch, 1997
- Truljalia viminea Gorochov, 2002
