= Castello di Lombardia =

Castle in Enna, Italy

- Enna, Sicily, Italy
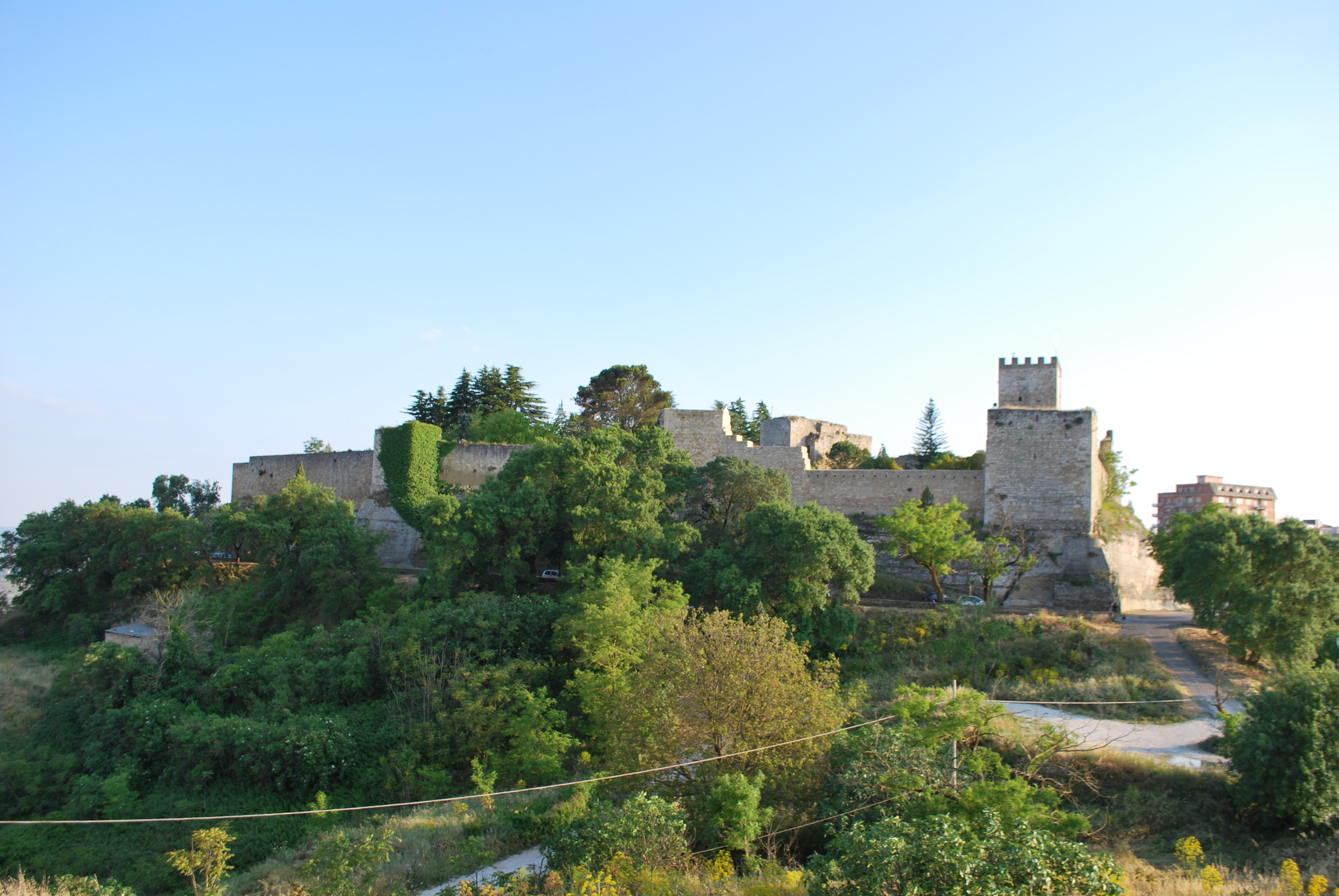
- View of the castle from the north-east

Site information
- Type: castle
- Open to the public: Yes
- Condition: Ruins

Location
- Location within Sicily
- Coordinates: 37°34′1.2″N 14°17′16.8″E
- Area: 25,000 m^{2} (270,000 sq ft)

Site history
- Built: 1076

The Castello di Lombardia ("Lombardy Castle") is a castle in Enna, Sicily. It is one of the largest and most ancient edifices in Italy, with an area of some 26,000 m^{2} (280,000 sq ft)

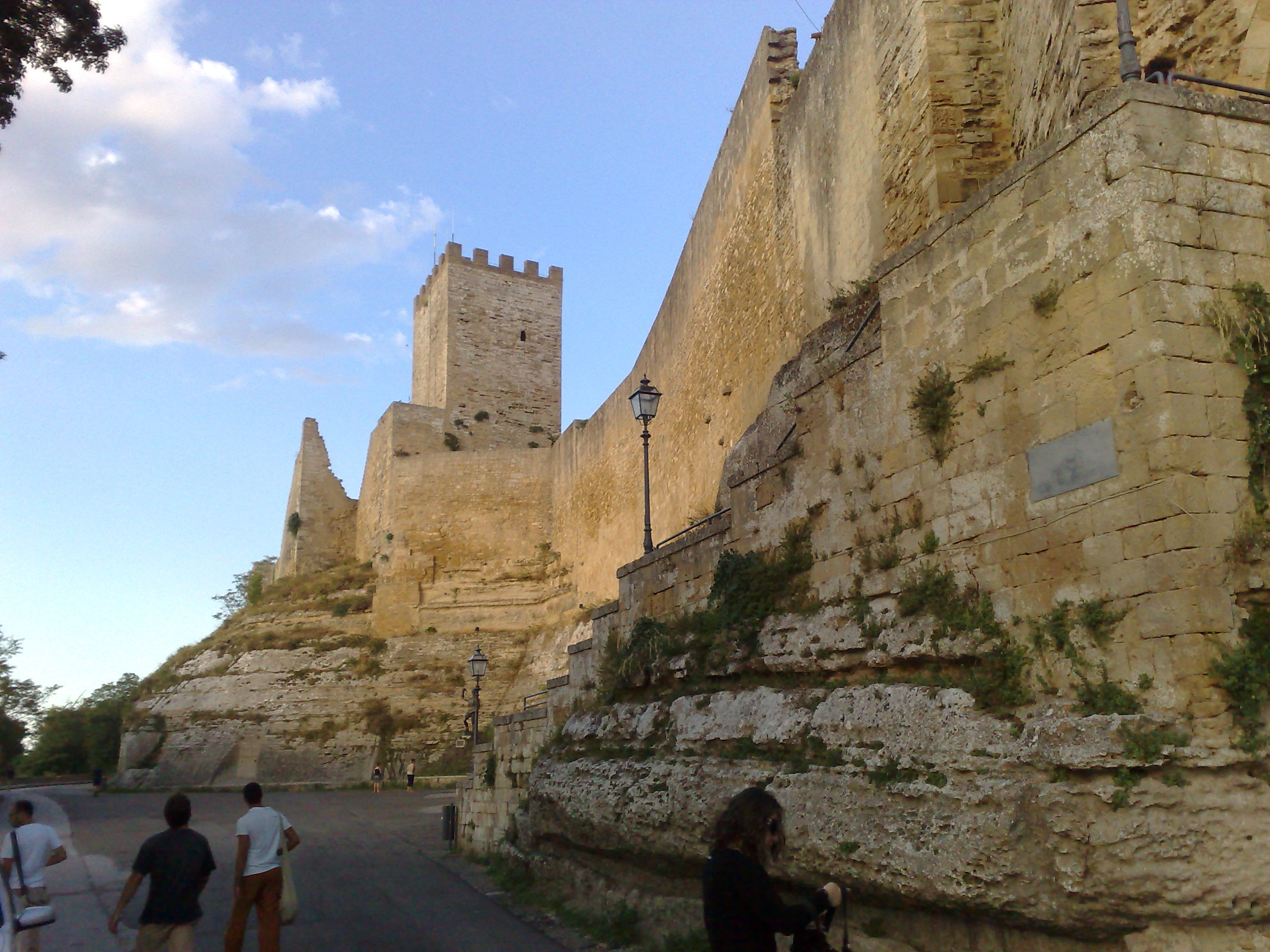
View of the castle's principle surviving tower from the exterior.

== History ==
The castle's origins are related to a fortress erected in the 1st millennium BC by the Sicani, on the foundation of the ancient Henna, on a hill 970 m above sea level. It remained a key possession in the subsequent history of the island.

The hilltop position made ancient Henna one of the strongest natural fortresses in Sicily. The Romans captured the fortress during their conquest of Sicily during the First Punic War. Surviving ancient accounts do not clearly describe the manner of the Roman conquest.

According to local tradition, the fortress was entered through an underground drainage passage. In Volume I of Storia dei Musulmani di Sicilia (1854), Michele Amari recounts the 859 siege of Castrogiovanni (Enna). He describes the city's extraordinary defenses in detail and then narrates how it was finally taken. A Byzantine defector revealed a way into the fortress, after which a select group of Muslim soldiers approached the north face of the citadel. They entered through an aqueduct (acquedotto) that passed beneath the wall. Once inside, they killed the guards and opened the gates for the main army.

Under the castle was the ancient Sican temple of Ceres, site of the widespread cult of that goddess in the whole of Italy, which was described by Cicero.

After the fall of the Western Roman Empire, it was used by the Byzantines and resisted Arab assaults for many years. After their victory, the latter rebuilt the fortress around the 10th century; the castle was also used by their successors in Sicily, the Normans. Two centuries later, architect Richard of Lentini was commissioned by Frederick II, Emperor and King of Sicily, to restore it as a summer residence. He added 20 towers and called in a garrison coming from the Langobardia minor (Calabria), whence the castle's name.

With the advent of artillery, the castle lost its primary strategic role and was turned into a prison. In the 20th and early 21st century, the castle was the site of the Teatro più vicino alle Stelle ("The Nearest Theatre to the Stars"), used for opera and pop music concerts.

The castle is now open to the public.

== See also ==
- List of castles in Italy
