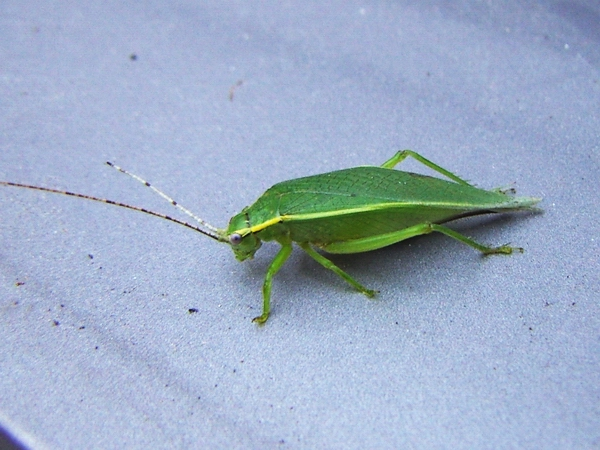
- Truljalia hibinonis

Scientific classification
- Kingdom: Animalia
- Phylum: Arthropoda
- Clade: Pancrustacea
- Class: Insecta
- Order: Orthoptera
- Suborder: Ensifera
- Family: Oecanthidae
- Subfamily: Podoscirtinae; Saussure, 1878

Synonyms
- Podoscirtites Saussure, 1878; Adenopterini Otte, 1994

= Podoscirtinae =

Subfamily of crickets

Podoscirtinae is a subfamily of crickets in the family Oecanthidae.

== Tribes and Genera ==
The Orthoptera Species File includes two supertribes:

=== supertribe Hapithidi ===
Auth.: Gorochov, 1986 - Americas

- tribe Aphonomorphini Desutter-Grandcolas, 1988
- tribe Cearacesaini Koçak & Kemal, 2010
- tribe Hapithini Gorochov, 1986
- tribe Phyllogryllini Campos, 2022

supertribe Podoscirtidi Saussure, 1878

=== Aphonoidini ===
Auth.: Gorochov, 2008

- subtribe Diatrypina Desutter-Grandcolas, 1988 – South America
1. Diatrypa Saussure, 1874
- genus group Aphonoides Gorochov, 2008 – Africa, E. Asia, Australia
1. Aphonoides Chopard, 1940
2. Exomunda Gorochov, 2007
3. Furcimunda Gorochov, 2007
4. Zamunda Gorochov, 2007
- genus group Deinutona Gorochov, 2008 - New Guinea
1. Deinutona Gorochov, 2008
2. Paputona Gorochov, 2008
- genus group Mistshenkoana Gorochov, 2008 - SE Asia, Australia
1. Dinomunda Gorochov, 2007 - monotypic D. griseipennis (Chopard, 1969) from peninsular Malaysia
2. Mistshenkoana Gorochov, 1990
- genus group Protomunda Gorochov, 2008 - Malesia to New Guinea
1. Brevimunda Gorochov, 2007
2. Protomunda Gorochov, 2007
- genus group Unka Gorochov, 2008 - New Guinea, E. Australia
1. Pseudounka Gorochov, 2008
2. Unka Otte & Alexander, 1983
- genus group not assigned
1. Aphasius – monotypic – A. ritsemae Saussure, 1878 - Indonesia
2. Corixogryllus Bolívar, 1900 - India
3. Gryllaphonus Chopard, 1951 - monotypic G. striatipennis Chopard, 1951 - Pacific Is.
4. Munda (insect) Stål, 1877 - Malesia
5. Umbulgaria Otte & Alexander, 1983 - NE. Australia
6. Utona Gorochov, 1986 - Australia

=== Podoscirtini ===
Auth.: Saussure, 1878 – Global tropics & subtropics

subtribe Podoscirtina

1. Allotrella Gorochov, 2006
2. Atruljalia Gorochov, 1988
3. Brevitrella Gorochov, 2004
4. Eupodoscirtus Gorochov, 2004
5. Kilimagryllus Sjöstedt, 1910
6. Malawitrella Gorochov, 2021
7. Malgasotrella Gorochov, 2004
8. Neoasymmetrella Deshmukh, Misar, Shende, Mungole & Reddy, 2023
9. Neozvenella Gorochov, 2004
10. Ocellotrella Gorochov, 2021
11. Ombrotrella Gorochov, 2006
12. Podoscirtus Serville, 1838 - monotypic P. crocinus Serville: type genus from Madagascar
13. Spinotrella Gorochov, 2004
14. Stenotrella Gorochov, 2005
15. Ultratrella Gorochov, 2004
16. Zvenellomorpha Gorochov, 2004
- genus group Hemiphonus Otte & Alexander, 1983
1. Hemiphonus Saussure, 1878
2. Riatina Otte & Alexander, 1983
- genus group Madasumma Otte & Alexander, 1983
1. Madasumma Walker, 1869
2. Tamborina Otte & Alexander, 1983
- genus group not assigned
1. Abaxitrella Gorochov, 2002
2. Adenopterus Chopard, 1951
3. Anaudus Saussure, 1874
4. Anisotrypus Saussure, 1878
5. Archenopterus Otte, 1987
6. Atrella Gorochov, 2003
7. Calscirtus Otte, 1987
8. Fryerius Uvarov, 1940
9. Furcitrella Gorochov, 2002
10. Hemiphonoides Chopard, 1951
11. Hemitrella Gorochov, 2003
12. Heterecous Saussure, 1897
13. Homalotrypus Brancsik, 1895
14. Idiotrella Gorochov, 2002
15. Indotrella Gorochov, 2003
16. Insulascirtus Otte & Rentz, 1985
17. Matuanus Gorochov, 1986
18. Mnesibulus Stål, 1877
19. Noctitrella Gorochov, 1990
20. Parametrypa Brunner von Wattenwyl, 1873
21. Paranaudus Saussure, 1878
22. Phyllotrella Gorochov, 1988
23. Pixipterus Desutter-Grandcolas, 2016
24. Pluviam He, Ma & Zhang, 2021
25. Poliotrella Gorochov, 1988
26. Posus Bolívar, 1890
27. Prozvenella Gorochov, 2002
28. Pseudomadasumma Shiraki, 1930
29. Rupilius Stål, 1876
30. Scepastus Gerstaecker, 1863
31. Sonotrella Gorochov, 1988
32. Trelleora Gorochov, 1988
33. Valiatrella Gorochov, 2005
34. Varitrella Gorochov, 2003
35. Xuanwua He & Gorochov, 2015
36. Zvenella Gorochov, 1988

=== Truljaliini ===
Auth.: Gorochov, 2020; distribution: Africa, Asia

1. Truljalia Gorochov, 1985

genus group Dolichogryllus Gorochov, 2005

1. Acrophonus Bolívar, 1910
2. Afrotruljalia Gorochov, 2005
3. Depressotrella Gorochov, 2005
4. Dolichogryllus Bolívar, 1910
5. Eumadasumma Chopard, 1934
6. Hemitruljalia Gorochov, 2005
7. Pachyaphonus Chopard, 1954
8. Pseudotruljalia Gorochov, 2005

=== Tribe incertae sedis ===
1. †Allopterites – monotypic – A. multilineatus Cockerell, 1920
2. †Stenogryllodes – monotypic – S. brevipalpis Chopard, 1936

no supertribe or tribe

1. †Picogryllus Josse & Desutter-Grandcolas, 2023
