= Noctitrella =

Scientific classification
- Domain: Eukaryota
- Kingdom: Animalia
- Phylum: Arthropoda
- Class: Insecta
- Order: Orthoptera
- Suborder: Ensifera
- Family: Oecanthidae
- Subfamily: Podoscirtinae
- Tribe: Podoscirtini
- Genus: Noctitrella; Gorochov, 1990

Genus of crickets

External image
- Image at iNaturalist

Noctitrella is a genus of crickets in the tribe Podoscirtini. Species have been recorded in: southern China and Indochina.

== Species ==
The Orthoptera Species File includes the following species:

- Noctitrella ardua Gorochov, 2003
- Noctitrella berezini Gorochov, 2003
- Noctitrella denticulata Liu & Shi, 2013
- Noctitrella devexa Gorochov, 2003
- Noctitrella hirsuta Ingrisch, 1997
- Noctitrella parardua Gorochov, 2003
- Noctitrella plurilingua Ingrisch, 1997
- Noctitrella spinosa Gorochov, 2003
- Noctitrella tranquilla Gorochov, 1990 - type species
