= Mistshenkoana =

Scientific classification
- Domain: Eukaryota
- Kingdom: Animalia
- Phylum: Arthropoda
- Class: Insecta
- Order: Orthoptera
- Suborder: Ensifera
- Family: Oecanthidae
- Subfamily: Podoscirtinae
- Tribe: Aphonoidini
- Genus: Mistshenkoana; Gorochov, 1990

Genus of crickets

External image
- Images at iNaturalist

Mistshenkoana is a genus of crickets in the subfamily Podoscirtinae and tribe Aphonoidini. Species can be found in tropical southeast Asia through to Australia and western Pacific islands.

== Species ==
Mistshenkoana includes the following species:

- Mistshenkoana abbreviata Gorochov, 2007
- Mistshenkoana anatom Gorochov, 2008
- Mistshenkoana angustifrons Chopard, 1930
- Mistshenkoana anisyutkini Gorochov, 2007
- Mistshenkoana aperta Gorochov, 2007
- Mistshenkoana asymmetrica Gorochov, 2008
- Mistshenkoana baduri Gorochov, 2008
- Mistshenkoana belokobylskiji Gorochov, 1992
- Mistshenkoana beybienkoi Gorochov, 1990
- Mistshenkoana borneo Gorochov, 2007
- Mistshenkoana buonluoi Gorochov, 2007
- Mistshenkoana caudatus Bey-Bienko, 1966
- Mistshenkoana chopardi Bey-Bienko, 1966
- Mistshenkoana decora Gorochov, 2008
- Mistshenkoana designata Gorochov, 2008
- Mistshenkoana discreta Gorochov, 2007
- Mistshenkoana erromango Gorochov, 2008
- Mistshenkoana fijiensis Gorochov, 1990
- Mistshenkoana gracilis Chopard, 1925
- Mistshenkoana hulu Gorochov, 2007
- Mistshenkoana kisarani Gorochov, 2007
- Mistshenkoana kolobagara Gorochov, 2008
- Mistshenkoana kongtumensis Gorochov, 1990 - type species
- Mistshenkoana kukum Gorochov, 2008
- Mistshenkoana lata Gorochov, 2008
- Mistshenkoana longa Gorochov, 2008
- Mistshenkoana malakula Gorochov, 2008
- Mistshenkoana nhachangi Gorochov, 2007
- Mistshenkoana nigrifrons Gorochov, 2007
- Mistshenkoana ornata Gorochov, 2007
- Mistshenkoana ounua Gorochov, 2008
- Mistshenkoana ouveus Otte, 1987
- Mistshenkoana padangi Gorochov, 2007
- Mistshenkoana pangrango Gorochov, 2007
- Mistshenkoana pileata Gorochov, 2008
- Mistshenkoana polyphemus Gorochov, 2008
- Mistshenkoana propria Gorochov, 2007
- Mistshenkoana proxima Gorochov, 2007
- Mistshenkoana ralum Gorochov, 2008
- Mistshenkoana rennell Gorochov, 2008
- Mistshenkoana reticulata Gorochov, 2007
- Mistshenkoana rufa Gorochov, 2008
- Mistshenkoana sharovi Gorochov, 1990
- Mistshenkoana solomonica Gorochov, 2008
- Mistshenkoana sumbawae Gorochov, 2007
- Mistshenkoana surda Chopard, 1929
- Mistshenkoana symmetrica Gorochov, 2008
- Mistshenkoana tembelingi Gorochov, 2007
- Mistshenkoana uniformis Gorochov, 2008
- Mistshenkoana vanuatu Gorochov, 2008
- Mistshenkoana vitiensis Saussure, 1878
- Mistshenkoana weta Otte & Alexander, 1983
