= Erean Mountains =

Mountain range in Sicily, Italy

Coordinates: 37.4167°N 14.35°E

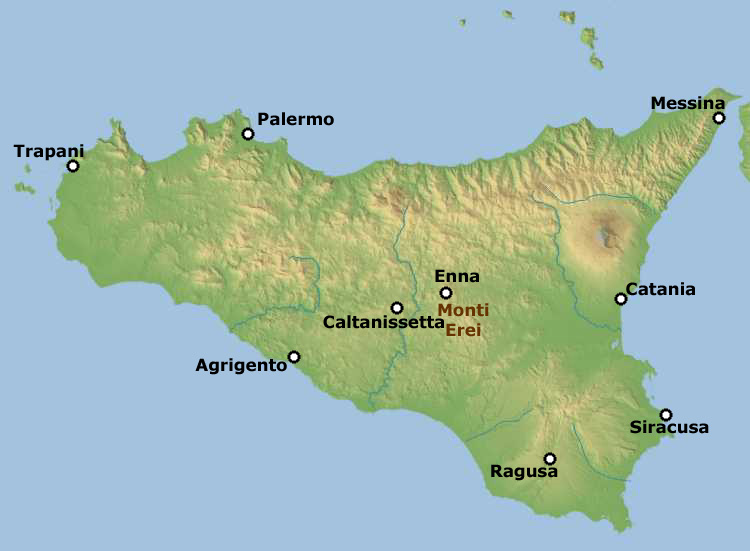
Location of the Herean Mountains in Sicily.

The Erean Mountains (also called the Heraean Mountains) (Sicilian: Munti Erei; Italian: Monti Erei; Latin: Heraei montes) are a mountain chain in central Sicily, southern Italy, mostly located in the central and northern areas of the province of Enna. The highest peak is the Monte Altesina, at 1,192 m above sea level. Other mountains in the ridge includes Bufambra peak and Busalmar mountain.

== Description ==
The Heraean Mountains are of limestone origin, and do not reach high altitudes. Their area was once one of the most important in the world for the production of sulphur, as testified today by numerous mineral quarries, the largest being that of Floristella-Grottacalda.

There are several lakes in the mountain group, such as Pergusa Lake, whose rich bird life has given it the status of being the first special Natural Reserve in Sicily, and Pozzillo Lake, the largest artificial basin on the island.

Due to the rugged landscape, the population totals less than 200,000 and thus the area's population density is lower. The chain is home to the largest Italian city above 900 m altitude (and the largest provincial capital in Europe at that altitude as well), Enna, which is home more or less to one-sixth of the whole Herean population.

The mountain chain is crossed by a motorway, A19 Palermo-Catania, and by a railroad running in the same direction. Most of the remaining roads wind and curve extensively through the terrain due to its rugged and geologically unstable nature.

== Main sights ==
- Enna
- Piazza Armerina
- Nicosia
- Morgantina
- Villa del Casale
- Roman archaeological area of Centuripe
