= Pozzillo Lake =

Lake in Sicily, Italy

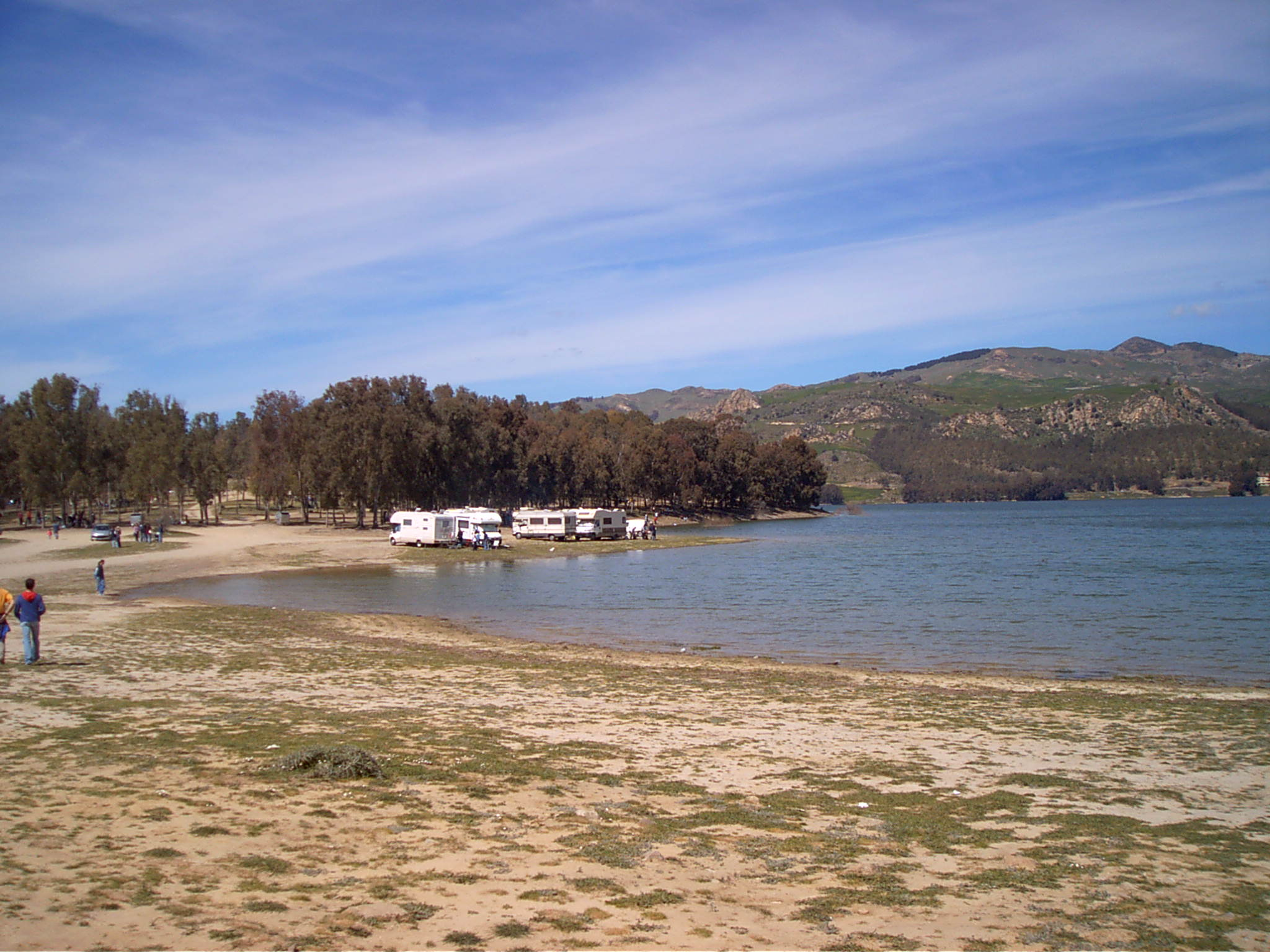

- Location within Sicily
- Location: Province of Enna, Sicily
- Coordinates: 37°39′38″N 14°35′21″E
- Primary inflows: Salso River
- Primary outflows: Salso River
- Basin countries: Italy
- Surface elevation: 370 m (1,210 ft)

Pozzillo Lake is a lake in the Province of Enna, Sicily, southern Italy. Located in the Erean Mountains, it is the largest artificial basin in the island. The lake is located mostly in the comune of Regalbuto, but also partially in Agira. The lake was formed when a dam was built in 1959 at the north eastern end of the lake.
