= Francesco d'Assisi, Gela =

Roman Catholic church in Gela, Sicily

Coordinates: 37.26°N 14.69°E

Church of Saint Francis of Assisi
- Chiesa di San Francesco d'Assisi
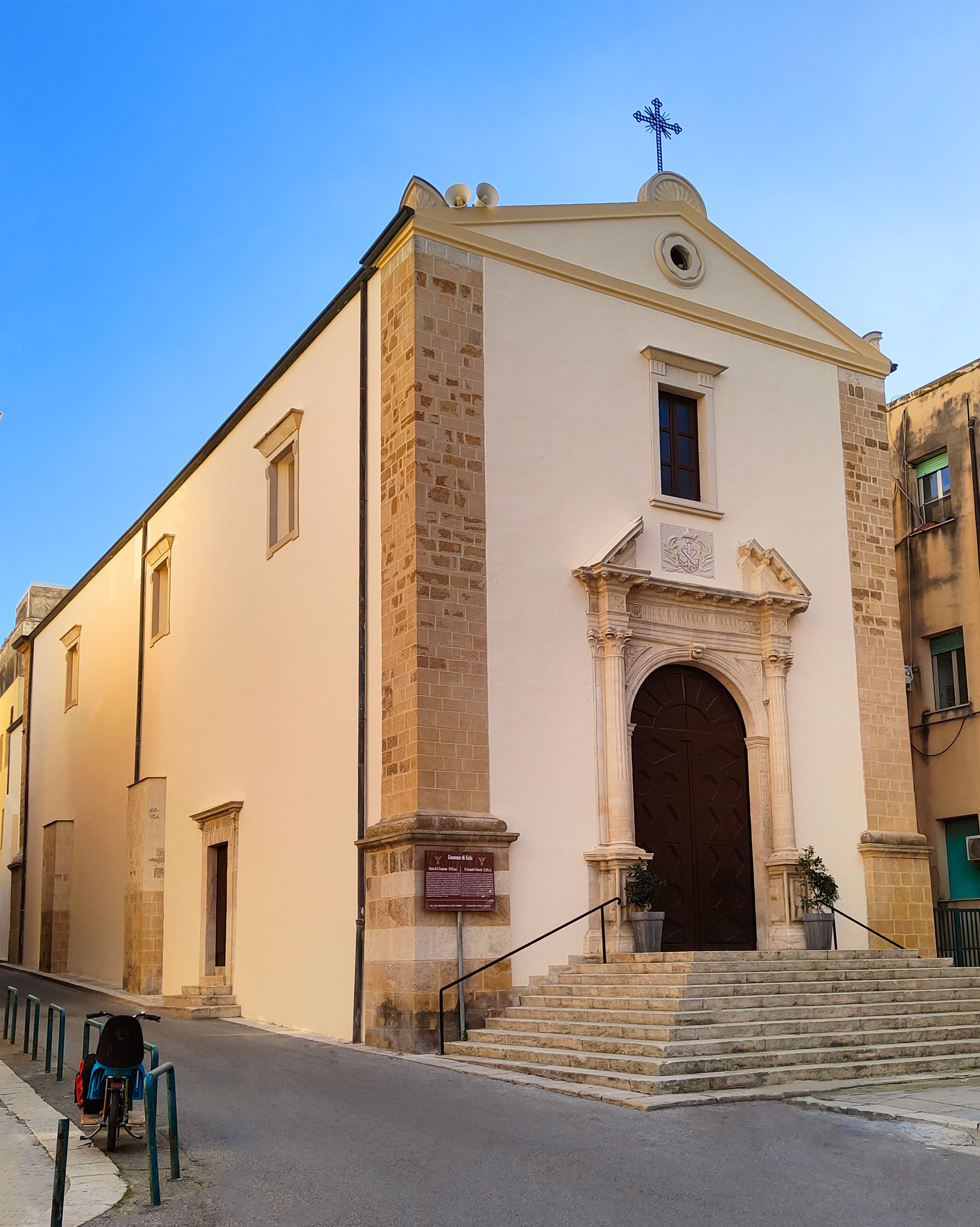

Religion
- Affiliation: Catholic
- Province: Caltanissetta
- Region: Sicily
- Rite: Roman
- Patron: Saint Francis of Assisi

Location
- State: Italy
- Country: Gela
- Interactive map of Church of Saint Francis of Assisi

Architecture
- Completed: 1665

The Saint Francis of Assisi (Italian: Chiesa di San Francesco d'Assisi) is a church in Gela, Italy.

== History ==
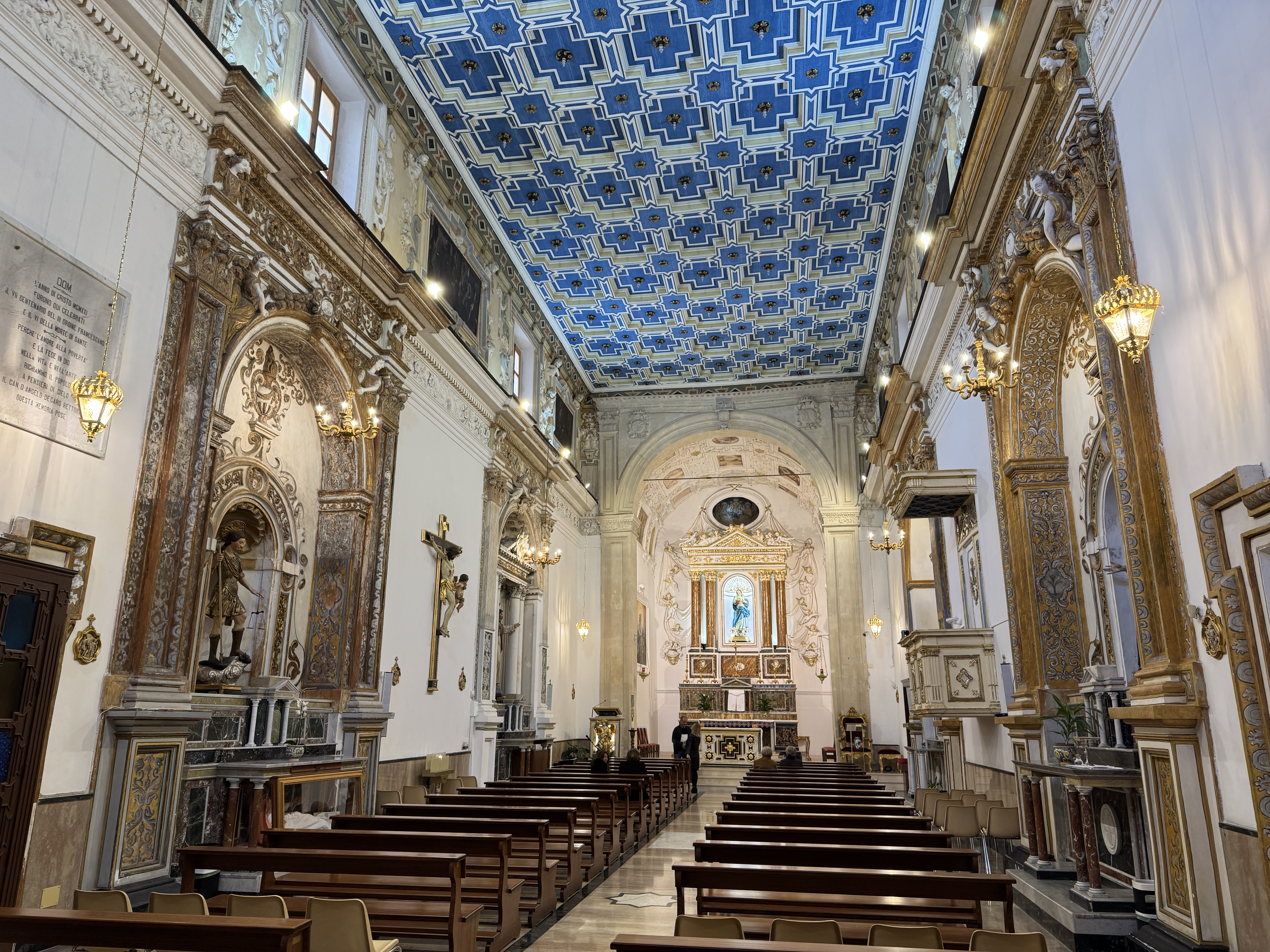
Interior

The Baroque church was built in 1659 to replace a prior church built in 1499. It houses prominent altarpieces including a Life of St Francis attributed to Giuseppe Salerno (Zoppo di Gangi); a Martyrdom of St Orsola by Francesco Paladini; and a Deposition (1768) by Vito D'Anna. The marble holy water font (16th-century) was likely sculpted by the studio of the Gagini family.
