= Sebastiano Ayala =

Italian Jesuit, philosopher and diplomat

- Born: 28 February 1744; Castrogiovanni, Kingdom of Sicily
- Died: 29 December 1817 (aged 73); Vienna, Austrian Empire
- Occupations: Jesuit priest; Philosopher; Diplomat
- Writing career
- Language: Italian; French
- Genre: treatise
- Movement: Counter-Enlightenment

Sebastiano Ayala SJ (28 February 1744 – 29 December 1817) was an Italian Jesuit, philosopher and diplomat.

== Biography ==
Sebastiano Ayala was born of a noble family, in the city of Castrogiovanni in Sicily, in the year 1744. He studied at Palermo, and was appointed professor of rhetoric at Malta. When the Jesuits were driven out of Malta, Ayala went to Rome, he having been excepted from the order which prohibited any Jesuit, a subject of the House of Bourbon, being received in that city. He studied theology in the Roman College during two years, and made such progress in mathematics and astronomy, that Lorenzo Ricci, the general of the order, determined to associate him with Leonardo Ximenes as his colleague and future successor in the observatory at Florence. Count Kaunitz, however, by whom he was held in great esteem, took him to Vienna, and by his influence, after the suppression of the Society of Jesus, Ayala was made minister from the Republic of Ragusa at the imperial court. He occupied that position for almost 30 years. Ayala was the only individual who had regular contact with Kaunitz in the weeks of the Chancellor's final illness. He was the friend and biographer of Metastasio. He died in Vienna on December 29, 1817.

== Works ==
- “Lettera apologetica della persona e del regno di Pietro il Grande contro le grossolane calunnie di Mirabeau.”
- “De la liberté et de l’égalité des hommes et des citoyens, avec des considérations sur quelques nouveaux dogmes politiques,” Vienna, 1792, 8vo., and again at Vienna in 1794, 8vo. It was translated into Italian under the title “Della libertà e della uguaglianza degli uomini e de’ cittadini, con riflessioni su di alcuni nuovi dommi politici,” 1793, 8vo. Two other translations in Italian also appeared. Also into German, “Ueber Freyheit und Gleichheit der Menschen und Bürger,” Vienna, 1793, 8vo. This work is directed against the Declaration of the Rights of Man and of the Citizen, and discusses at large the questions of civil liberties and equality. It was widely disseminated as propaganda by opponents of the French Revolution.
- Ayala was among the first who perceived the necessity of a revision of the Vocabolario degli Accademici della Crusca, particularly with a view to render the Latin explanations more precise and to remove many superfluous quotations. He explained his views in a work entitled “Dei difetti dell’antico Vocabolario della Crusca, che dovrebbero correggersi nella nuova edizione,” Vienna, 8vo.
- “Opere postume di Metastasio, date alla luce dall’abate Conte d’Ayala,” 3 vols. Vienna, 1795, 8vo., also in 4to. and in 12mo. in the same year, and at Paris in 3 vols., in 4to. and 8vo. in 1798. This publication contains Metastasio’s unpublished correspondence, translations of portions of Sophocles and Euripides, and his Life, written by Ayala. He is said to have been the author of several anonymous pieces, and to have published a catalogue of the productions of the Aldine Press, a complete collection of which he possessed. He also exposed the errors in Davanzati’s translation of Tacitus, and accompanied his criticism by a version of a copious extract from the Latin.

== Bibliography ==
- Jones, John Winter (1844). "Ayala, Sebastiano". The Biographical Dictionary of the Society for the Diffusion of Useful Knowledge. Vol. 4. Longman, Brown, Green, and Longmans. pp. 340–341.
- Sommervogel, Carlos (1890). Bibliothèque de la Compagnie de Jésus. Vol. I. Bruxelles-Paris. pp. 710 ff.
- De Tipaldo, Emilio Amedeo (1834). "Ayala (Sebastiano)". Biografia degli Italiani illustri del Secolo XVIII. Vol. I. Venice: Dalla tipografia di Alvisopoli. p. 26.
- Scinà, Domenico (1827). Prospetto della Storia Letteraria di Sicilia nel Secolo Decimottavo. Vol. III. Palermo: Dalla tipografia reale di guerra. pp. 194, 417–418.
- Morgana, Salvatore (1961). "Un grande siciliano: Sebastiano d'Ayala precursore dell'idea dell'unità d'Italia". Archivio Storico Siciliano. 12: 271–276.
- Nuzzo, Giuseppe (1962). "AYALA, Sebastiano d'". Dizionario Biografico degli Italiani (in Italian). Vol. 4: Arconati–Bacaredda. Rome: Institute of the Italian Encyclopaedia. OCLC 883370.
