= Adenopterus =

Scientific classification
- Domain: Eukaryota
- Kingdom: Animalia
- Phylum: Arthropoda
- Class: Insecta
- Order: Orthoptera
- Suborder: Ensifera
- Family: Oecanthidae
- Tribe: Podoscirtini
- Genus: Adenopterus; Chopard, 1951

Genus of crickets

Adenopterus is a genus of crickets belonging to the tribe Podoscirtini recorded from the Pacific Islands.

== Species ==
GBIF includes:

- Adenopterus admirandus D.Otte, 1987
- Adenopterus agrammus Desutter-Grandcolas, 1997
- Adenopterus amiensis Desutter-Grandcolas, 1997
- Adenopterus baloghi Gorochov, 1986
- Adenopterus bimaculatus Desutter-Grandcolas, 1997
- Adenopterus caledonicus D.Otte, 1987
- Adenopterus confixus D.Otte, 1987
- Adenopterus crouensis D.Otte, 1987
- Adenopterus dubius D.Otte, 1987
- Adenopterus dumbeus D.Otte, 1987
- Adenopterus euperplexus D.Otte, 1987
- Adenopterus incertus Desutter-Grandcolas, 1997
- Adenopterus kraussi D.Otte, 1987
- Adenopterus lifouensis D.Otte, 1987
- Adenopterus meridionalis Desutter-Grandcolas & Anso, 2016
- Adenopterus norfolkensis Chopard, 1951
- Adenopterus octolineatus Desutter-Grandcolas & Anso, 2016
- Adenopterus paraperplexus D.Otte, 1987
- Adenopterus perplexus D.Otte, 1987
- Adenopterus roseola (Gorochov, 1986)
- Adenopterus rouxi (Chopard, 1915)
- Adenopterus sarasini (Chopard, 1915)
- Adenopterus sarrameus D.Otte, 1987
- Adenopterus saussurei (Chopard, 1915)
- Adenopterus sylvaticus D.Otte, 1987
- Adenopterus tchambicus D.Otte, 1987
- Adenopterus yahouensis D.Otte, 1987
