= Salvatore Martinez =

Italian Catholic lay leader and theologian (born 1966)

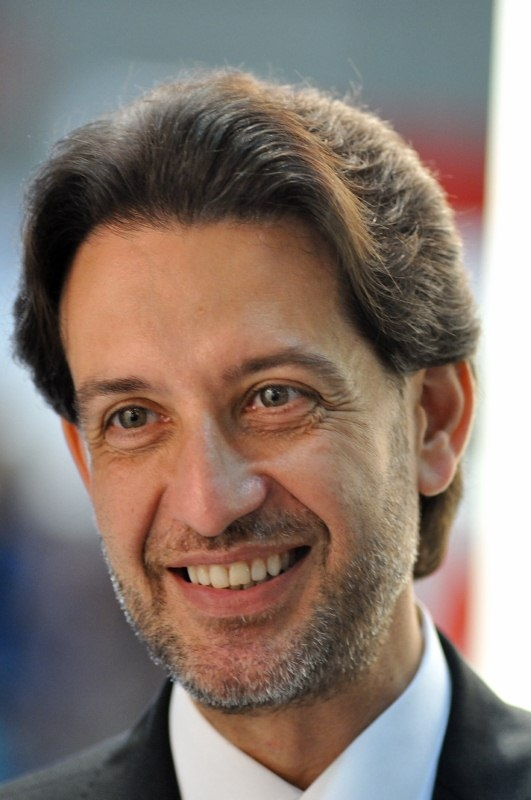
- Born: 4 May 1966 (age 60); Enna, Italy
- Education: University of Pavia
- Occupations: Theologian, essayist, composer
- Known for: President of Renewal in the Holy Spirit (1997–2023)

Salvatore Martinez (born 4 May 1966) is an Italian Catholic lay leader, theologian and essayist. From 1997 to 2023 he was the first lay president of Rinnovamento nello Spirito Santo (Renewal in the Holy Spirit), Italy's largest Catholic charismatic organisation. He served as Personal Representative of the OSCE Chairperson-in-Office on combating racism, xenophobia and discrimination in 2018, and teaches social ethics at the LUMSA University in Rome.

== Early life and education ==
Martinez was born in Enna, Sicily. His family was among the first in the city to join the Renewal in the Holy Spirit, which arrived in Enna in 1977, and he served as a music animator in his youth. He graduated in palaeography and musical philology from the University of Pavia.

== Renewal in the Holy Spirit ==
In 1997, aged 31, Martinez succeeded Mgr Dino Foglio as national coordinator of the Renewal in the Holy Spirit, becoming the movement's first lay president. He led the movement for twenty-six years, until the national elective assembly held at Sacrofano in March 2023, which elected Giuseppe Contaldo as his successor.

During his presidency the movement held its 37th national convocation at the Stadio Olimpico in Rome on 1–2 June 2014, attended by Pope Francis, and the ecumenical prayer vigil "Voices in prayer for today's martyrs" in St. Peter's Square on 3 July 2015.

== Church appointments ==
Pope Benedict XVI appointed Martinez consultor of the Pontifical Council for the Laity (2008), the Pontifical Council for the Family (2009) and the Pontifical Council for Promoting the New Evangelization (2012); the appointments were renewed by Pope Francis and lapsed when the dicasteries were dissolved. He took part as an auditor in the XIII Ordinary General Assembly of the Synod of Bishops on the New Evangelization in October 2012.

From 2012 to 2019 he was president of the Vatican foundation "International Centre Family of Nazareth", established by Benedict XVI to promote the Church's teaching on the family and to build a house for families in Nazareth.

== Public appointments ==
In 2017 the Italian Ministry of Foreign Affairs set up an Observatory on Religious Minorities in the World and Respect for Religious Freedom, which Martinez chaired until 2018.

On 2 January 2018, during the Italian chairmanship of the OSCE, he was appointed Personal Representative of the Chairperson-in-Office on combating racism, xenophobia and discrimination, with a focus on intolerance against Christians and members of other religions.

== Academic and civic activity ==
Martinez is an adjunct professor of Theology: Social Ethics at LUMSA University in Rome and teaches the theology of the Holy Spirit and charisms at the Pontifical Athenaeum Regina Apostolorum. He has also collaborated since 2019 with the Centro Universitário Católico Ítalo-Brasileiro (UNIÍTALO) in São Paulo.

Since 2000 he has chaired the "Mons. Francesco Di Vincenzo" Institute for Human Promotion Foundation in Enna, which runs the "Mario and Luigi Sturzo" centre in Caltagirone for the rehabilitation of prisoners and former prisoners. From 2009 to 2020 he was president of the Casa Museo Sturzo Foundation in Caltagirone. He is president of AnimAzione ETS, a network of Catholic universities, foundations and associations devoted to forming a new generation of civic leaders inspired by Catholic social teaching. He has been a member of the International Charismatic Consultation since 2000 and was international vice-president of Youth Arise International (1996–2018).

== Writings and music ==
Martinez is the author of some thirty books on spirituality, mostly published by Edizioni RnS, with others published by Edizioni San Paolo, Paoline and Rubbettino, and contributed to the collective volume Carismi, fuoco vivo nella storia, edited by Giulio Maspero (Città Nuova). He has composed sacred music used in the movement's liturgical repertoire since 1986.

=== Selected works ===
A full list of publications is available on the author's website.

- Sospinti dallo Spirito. Ripartiamo dal Cenacolo. Cinisello Balsamo: San Paolo, 2014.
- Rimane con voi e sarà in voi. Rome: Edizioni RnS, 2017.
- Paolo VI. Umanità e spiritualità. Rome: Edizioni RnS, 2018.
- La vera rivoluzione è spirituale. La straordinaria attualità dell'umanesimo cristiano in don Luigi Sturzo. Soveria Mannelli: Rubbettino, 2019.
- Francesco. Spirito Santo, sorgente inesauribile di vita. Milan: Paoline, 2021. ISBN 978-88-315-5825-9
