= Abaxitrella =

Scientific classification
- Domain: Eukaryota
- Kingdom: Animalia
- Phylum: Arthropoda
- Class: Insecta
- Order: Orthoptera
- Suborder: Ensifera
- Family: Oecanthidae
- Subfamily: Podoscirtinae
- Tribe: Podoscirtini
- Genus: Abaxitrella; Gorochov, 2002

Genus of crickets

Abaxitrella is a genus of crickets in the subfamily Podoscirtinae and tribe Podoscirtini. This genus has species recorded from southeast China and Vietnam.

== Species ==
Two species are currently known:

- Abaxitrella hieroglyphica (Gorochov, 2002) - type species
- Abaxitrella uncinata Ma & Gorochov, 2015
