= Valiatrella =

Scientific classification
- Domain: Eukaryota
- Kingdom: Animalia
- Phylum: Arthropoda
- Class: Insecta
- Order: Orthoptera
- Suborder: Ensifera
- Family: Oecanthidae
- Subfamily: Podoscirtinae
- Tribe: Podoscirtini
- Genus: Valiatrella; Gorochov, 2005

Synonyms
- Valia Gorochov, 1985

Genus of crickets

Valiatrella is a genus of crickets in the tribe Podoscirtini. Species have been recorded in: India, southern China and Vietnam.

== Species ==
The Orthoptera Species File includes the following species:

- Valiatrella bimaculata (Chopard, 1928)
- Valiatrella laminaria Liu & Shi, 2007
- Valiatrella multiprotubera Liu & Shi, 2007
- Valiatrella persicifolius Ma & Zhang, 2013
- Valiatrella pulchra (Gorochov, 1985) - type species (as Valia pulchra Gorochov)
- Valiatrella sororia (Gorochov, 2002)
