= Santa Chiara, Enna =

Baroque Roman Catholic church

Coordinates: 37.56675°N 14.28094°E

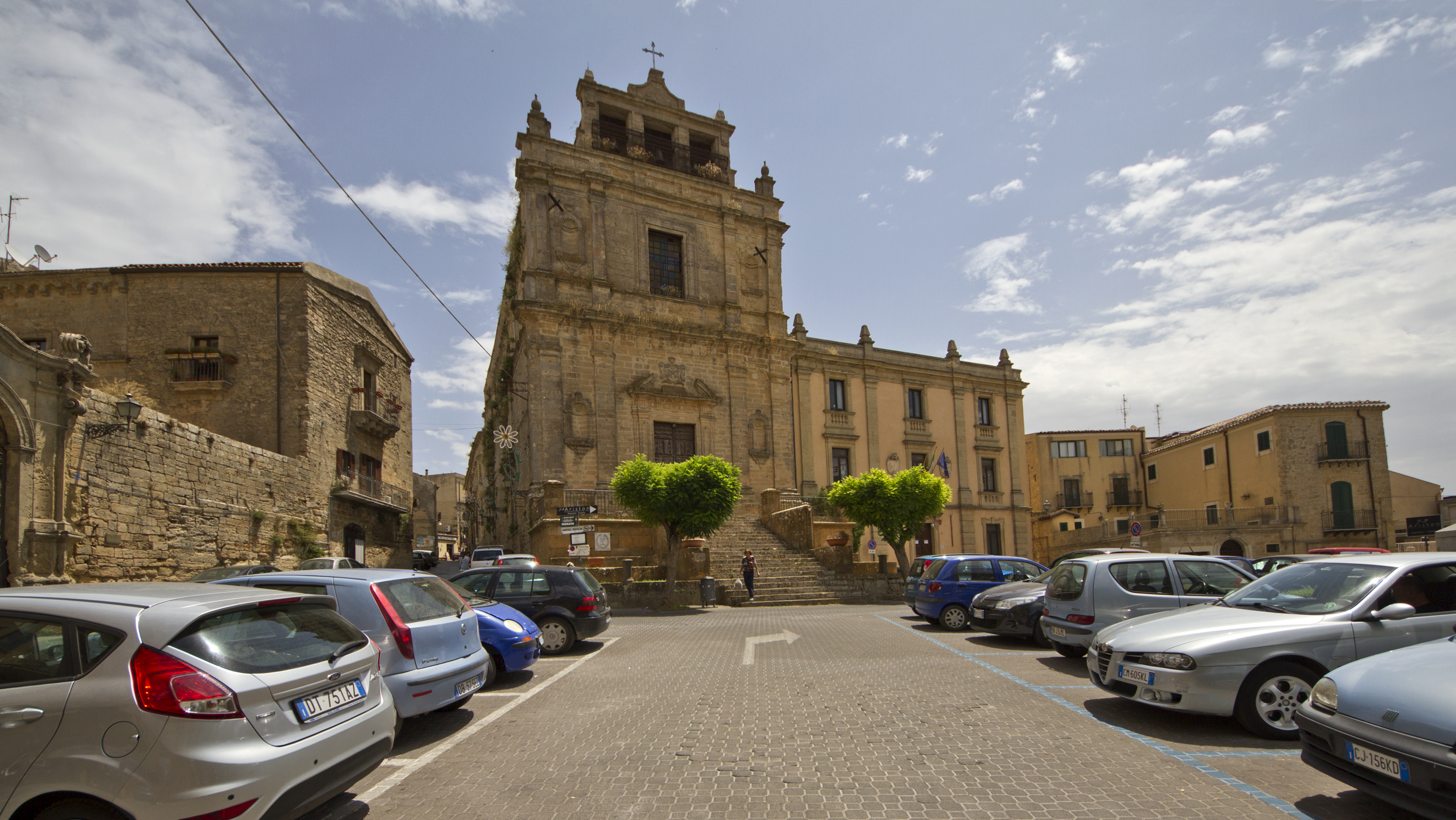
Facade of church

Santa Chiara (Saint Clare) is the Roman Catholic church in the town of Enna, in the region of Sicily, Italy.

== History and description ==
The church was commissioned in the early 17th century by the aristocrat Francesco Rotondo and his mother Costanza. The Baroque style façade has a broken tympanum with a coat of arms spelling IHS, the Jesuit symbol. The façade is preceded by a broad and long staircase. The church has a single nave and the apse has a maiolica floor, installed in 1850. The church contains a canvas by Giuseppe Salerno, nicknamed the Zoppo di Gangi. By 1619 the church was under the ownership of the Jesuit order, until their expulsion from the Kingdom of Naples in 1767. Only later was the church linked to the Clarissan order. After World War II, the church housed a Shrine for burial of the fallen in the war.
