= Santissimi Salvatore, Enna =

Renaissance Roman Catholic church

Coordinates: 37.56624°N 14.28355°E

Santissimi Salvatore or SS. Salvatore (Holiest Savior) is the Roman Catholic church located on Via San Salvatore in the town of Enna, in the region of Sicily, Italy.

== History and description ==
A chapel at the site was erected circa 1261 as a private chapel adjacent to the Basilian Monastery. But by 1572 the local Confraternity of the Collegio del SS. Salvatore obtained permission from the Bishop of Catania to replace the chapel with this church, completed in 1579. A few columns from the Basilian cloister are seen in the inner courtyard. Much of the interior dates to 17th-century refurbishment including the maiolica ceramic floor and the elaborately carved rosettes and cassettoni in the oak ceiling. The single nave is framed by white pilasters and columns with stucco statues of saints. The cruxifix at the main altar dates to 1262. The statue of the Dead Christ dates, however, to the 17th century. The icon of the Risen Christ is carried in an Easter procession. One of the altarpieces is a copy of Raphael's Transfiguration.

The exterior bell-tower was completed in 1888. The church courtyard uses spolia columns from a medieval Basilian monastery that was nearby.

In the 18th century, the church was further decorated with a reliquary of St Erasmus made of alabaster with a statue of the Madonna delle Vittorie, also called del Cardellino. The church and its artworks has undergone a number of recent restorations.
