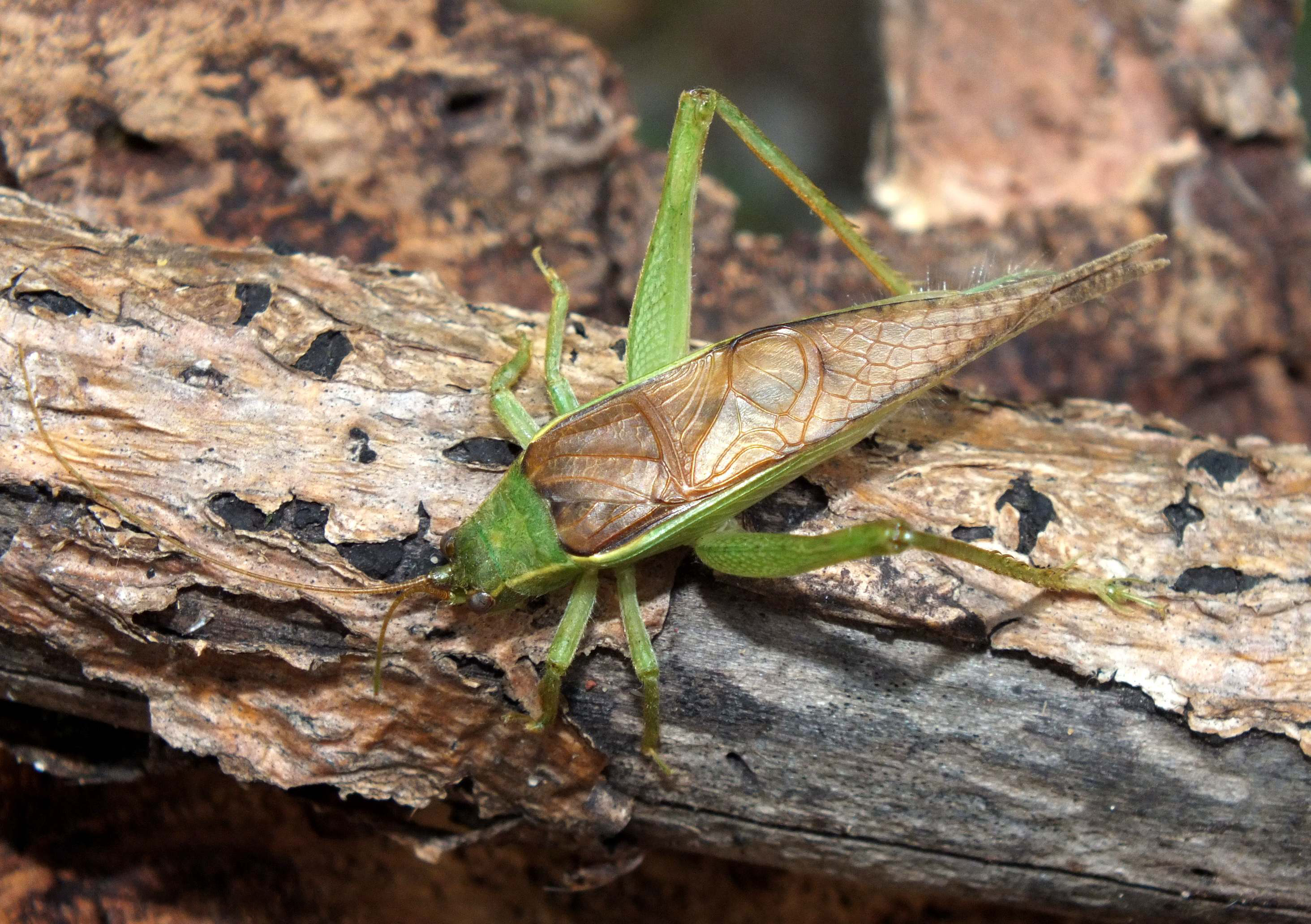

Scientific classification
- Domain: Eukaryota
- Kingdom: Animalia
- Phylum: Arthropoda
- Class: Insecta
- Order: Orthoptera
- Suborder: Ensifera
- Family: Oecanthidae
- Subfamily: Podoscirtinae
- Tribe: Podoscirtini
- Genus: Sonotrella; Gorochov, 1988

= Sonotrella =

Genus of crickets

Sonotrella is a genus of crickets in the subfamily Podoscirtinae and tribe Podoscirtini. Species have been recorded in: southern China, Indo-China and west Malesia.

== Species ==
Sonotrella includes the following species:

subgenus not determined

- Sonotrella maculithorax (Chopard, 1930)
- Sonotrella pallida (Walker, 1869)

subgenus Calyptotrella Gorochov, 2002

- Sonotrella bicolor Ingrisch, 1997
- Sonotrella bipunctata Chopard, 1969
- Sonotrella bispinosa Chopard, 1969
- Sonotrella indicativa Gorochov, 2002
- Sonotrella lobata Chopard, 1969
- Sonotrella omissa Gorochov, 2002
- Sonotrella quadrivittata Liu, Shi & Ou, 2006
- Sonotrella spectata Gorochov, 2002

subgenus Megatrella Gorochov, 2002

- Sonotrella grandipennis Chopard, 1929
- Sonotrella optima Gorochov, 2002
- Sonotrella remota Gorochov, 2002
- Sonotrella tenebra (Ingrisch, 1997)
- Sonotrella typica Gorochov, 2002
- Sonotrella willemsei (Chopard, 1925)

subgenus Sonotrella Gorochov, 1988

- Sonotrella crumbi (Chopard, 1969)
- Sonotrella diluta Gorochov, 2002
- Sonotrella exculta Gorochov, 1992
- Sonotrella inflata Gorochov, 2002
- Sonotrella laosensis Liu, Zhang & Shi, 2016
- Sonotrella major Liu, Yin & Wang, 1993
- Sonotrella mekongica Gorochov, 1988 - type species (locality: environs of Mekong River, Vietnam)
- Sonotrella proxima Gorochov, 1990
- Sonotrella virescens Gorochov, 1990
