= Giuseppe Salerno =

Italian painter

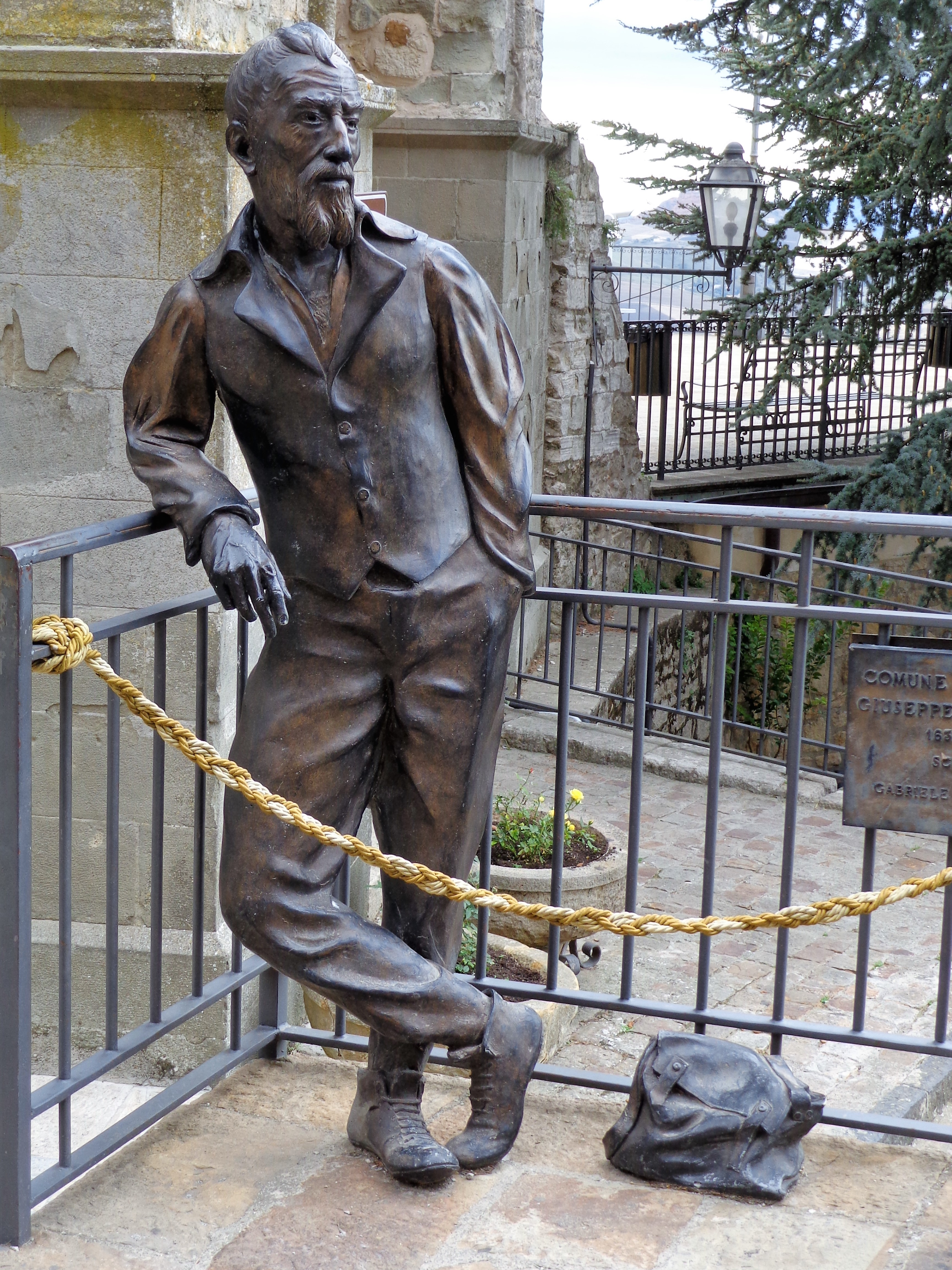
A sculpture dedicated to Giuseppe Salerno

Giuseppe Salerno, more commonly called il Zoppo di Gangi (Cripple from the town of Gangi) (1588–1630) was an Italian painter active in his native Sicily in a Mannerist style. He may have used the title Zoppo because he was a pupil of Gaspare Vazzano or Bazzano (1562–1630), also was known as the Zoppo di Gangi. Some of his known works are:

- Madonna delle Grazie with Saints Mark and Blaise (1611): Chiesa di San Marco e Biagio, Petralia Sottana
- Holy Family with Saint Anne and Joachim (1607): San Francesco d'Assisi, Petralia Sottana
- St Francis receives stigmata (1624): San Francesco d'Assisi, Petralia Sottana
- Triumph of the Eucharist with Saints Catherine and Peter Martyr (1617): Chiesa Madre, Petralia Sottana
- Triumph of the Eucharist with Saints Catherine and Peter Martyr (1607): Chiesa Madre, Petralia Sottana
- Five Wounds of Christ (1629): Chiesa Madre, Petralia Sottana
- St Maurus Abbot (1623): Chiesa Madre, Petralia Sottana
- St Onophrius: Chiesa Madre, Petralia Sottana
- Dormition of the Virgin (1607): Once in the Franciscan convent, now housed in Palazzo del Giglio (Town Hall) of Petralia Sottana
- Altarpiece in Santa Chiara, Enna
- Life of St Franci (attributed to Zoppo di Gangi): Francesco d'Assisi, Gela
- Saint Jerome: Sant'Orsola, Palermo
