= Pergusa Lake =

Lake in Sicily, Italy

Lake Pergusa Lago di Pergusa
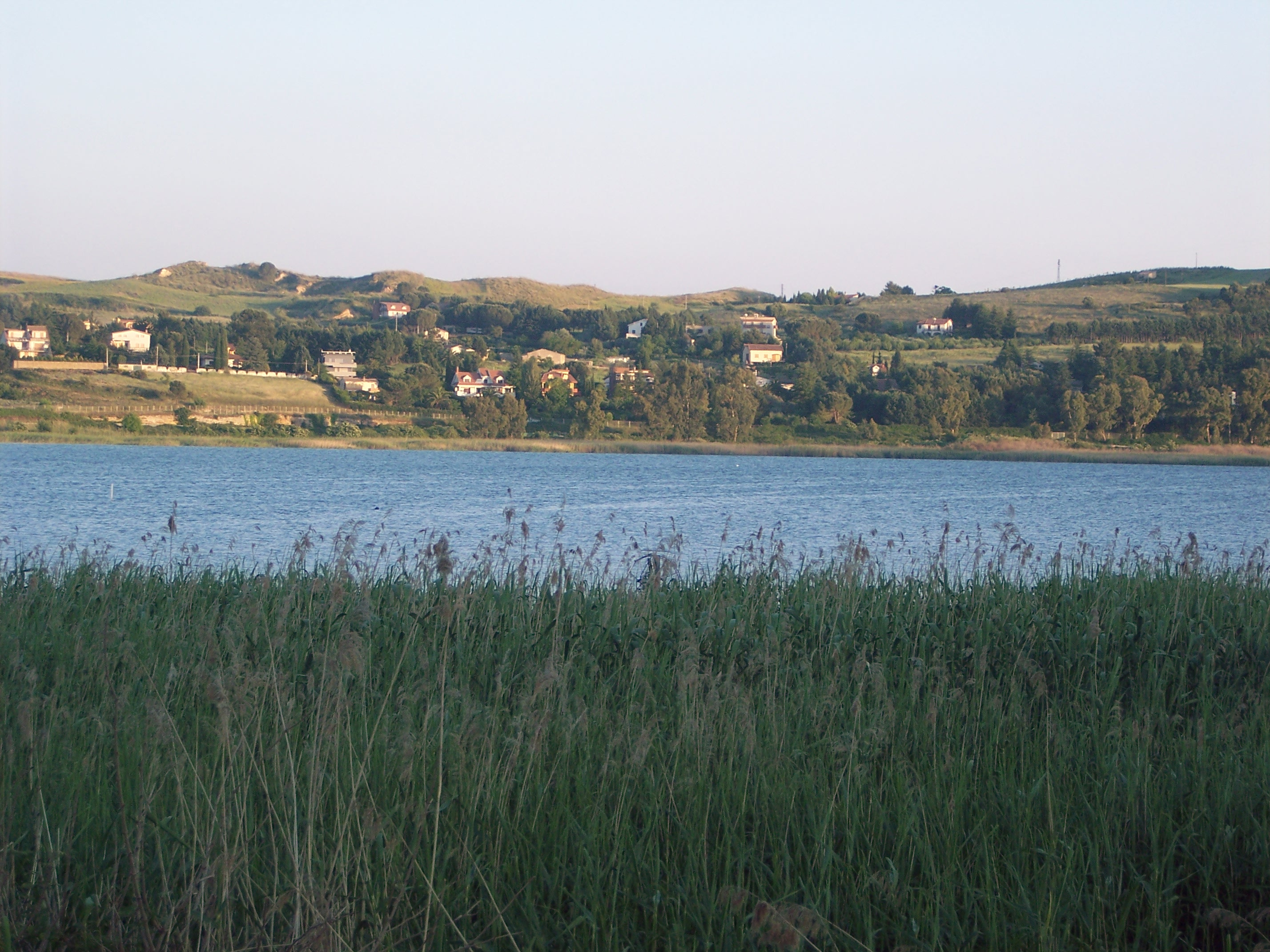

- Location within Sicily
- Location: Province of Enna, Sicily
- Coordinates: 37°30′50″N 14°18′21″E
- Basin countries: Italy
- Surface area: 1.8 km^{2} (0.69 sq mi)
- Max. depth: 12 m (39 ft)
- Surface elevation: 670 m (2,200 ft)

Lake Pergusa (Pergoussa, Πυργούσσα in Ancient Greek) is a lake in Sicily, set between a group of mountains in the Erean Mountains chain near Pergusa, 5 km from Enna, Italy. It is a vital stop in the migratory trajectory of a great number of birds. In addition to birds, which are by far the main inhabitants of the Pergusa nature reserve, there are also interesting species of mammals, reptiles, amphibians and invertebrates found here. At an elevation of 670 m, the lake's surface area is 1.83 km^{2}.

== Overview ==
The lake is encircled by the most important racing track of Southern Italy, the Autodromo di Pergusa, that hosts international competitions and events, such as Formula One, Formula 3000 and a Ferrari Festival that has featured Formula One star Michael Schumacher.

In the area of Lake Pergusa, an archeological site known as Cozzo Matrice can be found. This site essentially houses the ruins of an old fortified village, containing imposing walls constructed around the 9th millennium BC, a sacred citadel, an opulent necropolis and the remains of an ancient temple dedicated to Demeter, dating back more than 2,000 years.

An important forest and vegetation zone named Selva Pergusina (meaning "Pergusa Wood") surrounds part of the Lake Pergusa Valley, producing a striking panorama.

In antiquity, the lake was said to be the site where Persephone was abducted by Hades.
