= Pergusa =

- Frazione
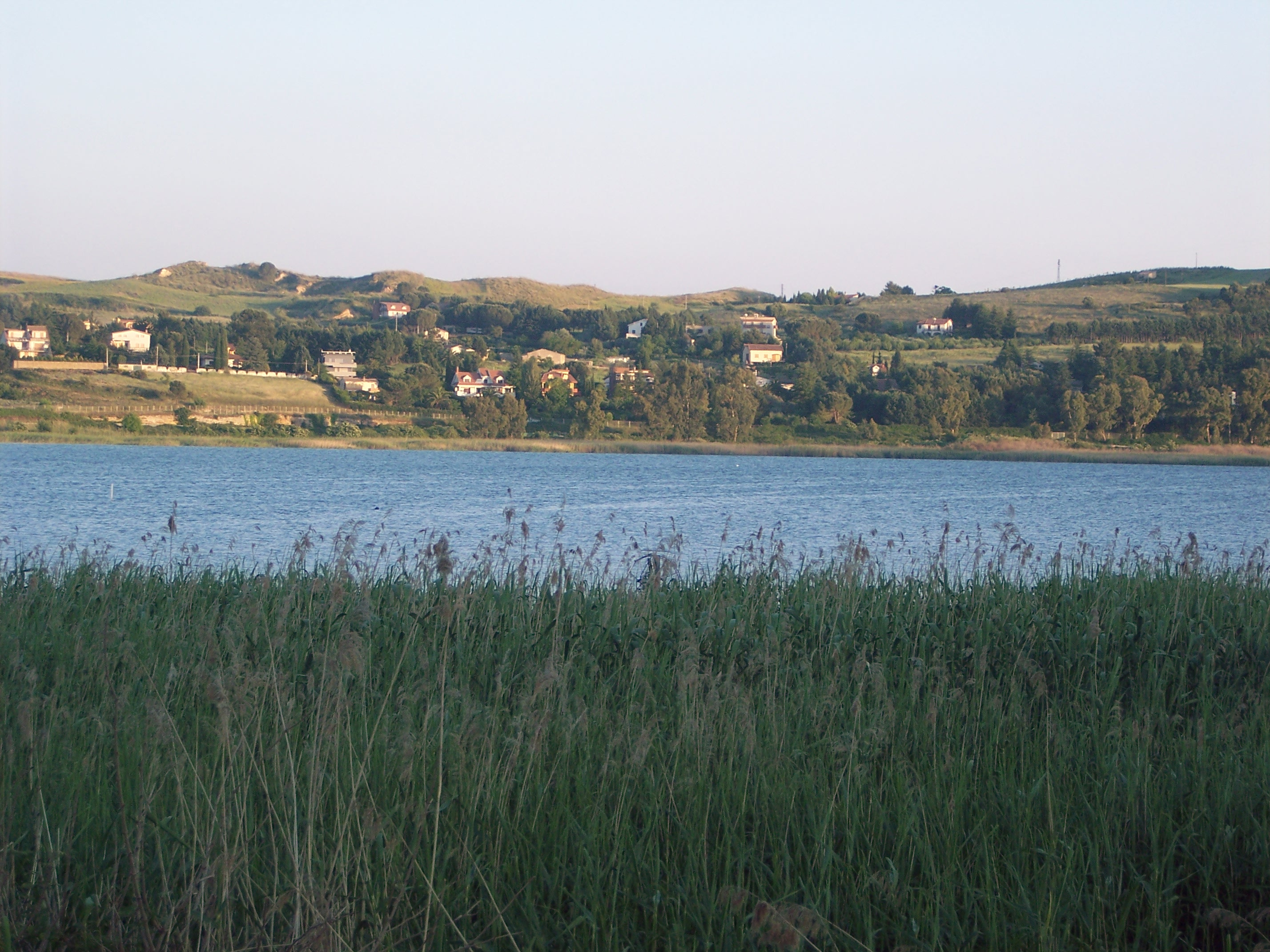
- Pergusa Lake

- Location of Pergusa in Italy
- Coordinates: 37°31′33″N 14°18′25″E
- Country: Italy
- Region: Sicily
- Province: Enna (EN)
- Comune: Enna
- Elevation: 710 m (2,330 ft)

Population (2006)
  - Total: 1,604
- Time zone: UTC+1 (CET)
  - Summer (DST): UTC+2 (CEST)
- Postal code: 94100
- Dialing code: 0935

Pergusa is an Italian village of Sicily. It is a frazione of Enna, the administrative seat of the same-named province.

== Geography ==
Pergusa lies in hills about 10 km south of Enna. Pergusa is reached by the Enna-Gela Road, which allow to reach Enna (about 5 km of way) and, from there, to entry the motorway Palermo-Catania.

The village gives its name to the Pergusa Lake, the only natural lake in Sicily, which is an important site for bird migration. The area is also surrounded by hills and forest known as Selva Pergusina.

== Sport ==
The lake is surrounded by a well-known racing circuit, the Autodromo di Pergusa, which was created in the 1960s. The track has hosted various sporting events to this day.

== See also ==
- Pergusa Lake
- Autodromo di Pergusa
