= Rupilius =

Scientific classification
- Domain: Eukaryota
- Kingdom: Animalia
- Phylum: Arthropoda
- Class: Insecta
- Order: Orthoptera
- Suborder: Ensifera
- Family: Oecanthidae
- Subfamily: Podoscirtinae
- Tribe: Podoscirtini
- Genus: Rupilius; Stål, 1876
- Species: R. nigrosignatus

Binomial name
- Rupilius nigrosignatus Stål, 1876

Genus of crickets

Rupilius is a genus of crickets in the family Oecanthidae and tribe Podoscirtini, erected by Carl Stål in 1876. The recorded distribution of the single species Rupilius nigrosignatus Stål, 1876 is South-West Africa.
