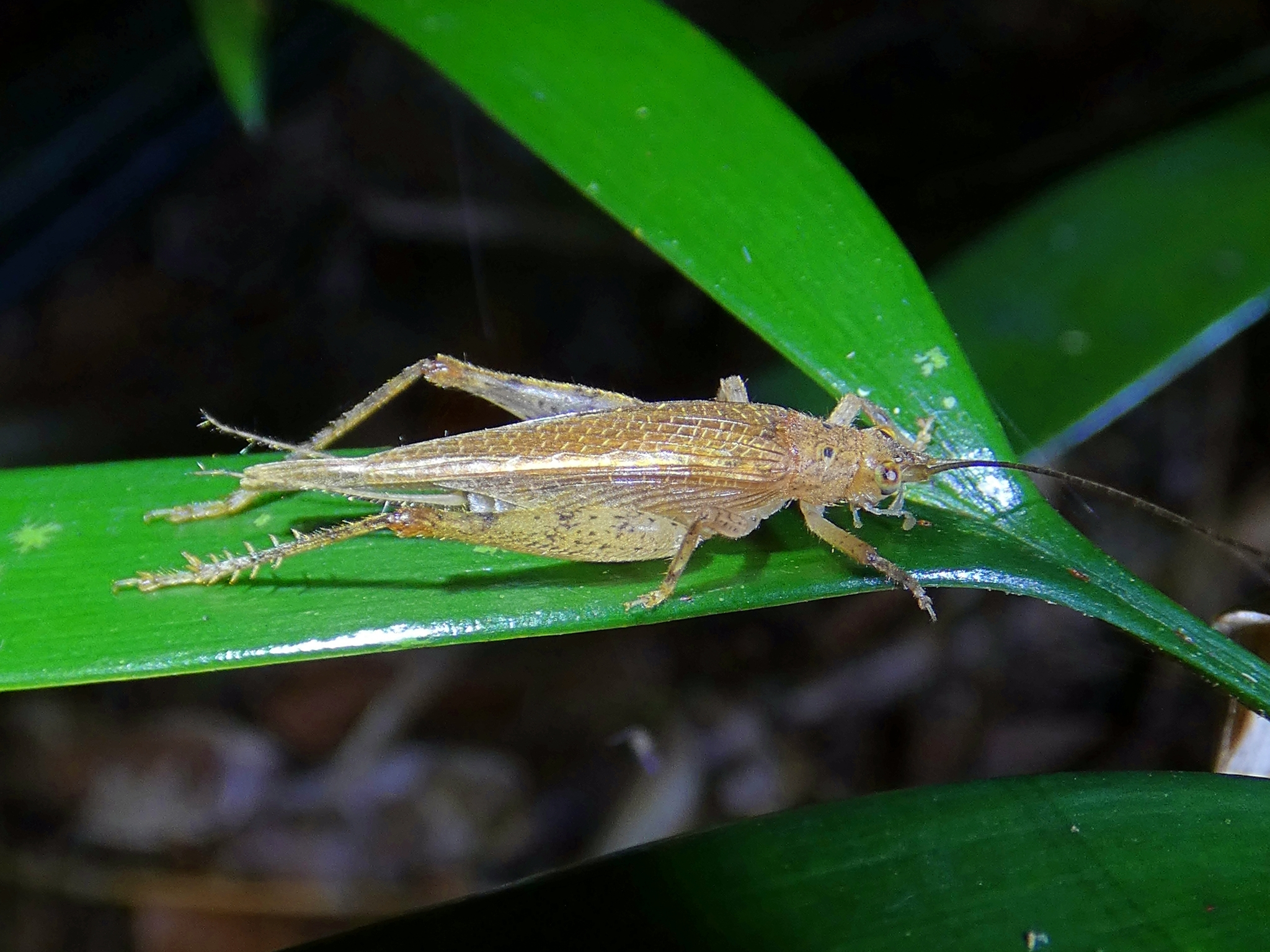
- Aphonoides debilis

Scientific classification
- Kingdom: Animalia
- Phylum: Arthropoda
- Clade: Pancrustacea
- Class: Insecta
- Order: Orthoptera
- Suborder: Ensifera
- Family: Oecanthidae
- Subfamily: Podoscirtinae
- Tribe: Aphonoidini
- Genus: Aphonoides; Chopard, 1940

= Aphonoides =

Genus of crickets

External image
- Images at iNaturalist

Aphonoides is a genus of crickets in the subfamily Podoscirtinae and tribe Aphonoidini. Most species records are from sub-Saharan Africa, Japan, eastern China, S.E. Asia and Australasia.

== Species ==
Aphonoides includes the following species:

species group australis (Walker, 1869)

1. Aphonoides australis (Walker, 1869)
2. Aphonoides miripara Otte & Alexander, 1983
3. Aphonoides nepotinna Otte & Alexander, 1983

species group biangri Otte & Alexander, 1983

1. Aphonoides agantra Otte & Alexander, 1983
2. Aphonoides biangri Otte & Alexander, 1983
3. Aphonoides binderi Otte & Alexander, 1983
4. Aphonoides hackeri Chopard, 1951
5. Aphonoides jimjimi Otte & Alexander, 1983
6. Aphonoides kaikai Otte & Alexander, 1983
7. Aphonoides karumbae Otte & Alexander, 1983
8. Aphonoides marika Otte & Alexander, 1983
9. Aphonoides warratinna Otte & Alexander, 1983

species group debilis (Chopard, 1925)

1. Aphonoides debilis (Chopard, 1925)
2. Aphonoides lowanna Otte & Alexander, 1983

no species group assigned

1. Aphonoides acuta Ingrisch, 1997
2. Aphonoides aequatori Gorochov, 2007
3. Aphonoides albonotatus Chopard, 1954
4. Aphonoides amplus Gorochov, 2008
5. Aphonoides angustissimus (Chopard, 1925)
6. Aphonoides apiatus (Saussure, 1878)
7. Aphonoides aspidoid Zheng, Xin, Xie & Ma, 2021
8. Aphonoides berezini Gorochov, 2007
9. Aphonoides bicolor Chopard, 1951
10. Aphonoides bituberculatus Gorochov, 2008
11. Aphonoides changi Gorochov, 2007
12. Aphonoides cinereus (Haan, 1844)
13. Aphonoides curtus Gorochov, 2008
14. Aphonoides curvto Zheng, Xin, Xie & Ma, 2021
15. Aphonoides cuspidatus Gorochov, 2008
16. Aphonoides depressiusculus (Saussure, 1878)
17. Aphonoides diadematus (Bolívar, 1910)
18. Aphonoides dohrni Gorochov, 2007
19. Aphonoides duri Tan & Wahab, 2020
20. Aphonoides emeljanovi Gorochov, 2008
21. Aphonoides excavatus Gorochov, 2008
22. Aphonoides flexus Gorochov, 2008
23. Aphonoides frons Gorochov, 2008
24. Aphonoides gialai Gorochov, 2007
25. Aphonoides griseovariegatus Chopard, 1969
26. Aphonoides hollowayi Gorochov, 2007
27. Aphonoides japonicus (Shiraki, 1930)
28. Aphonoides karnyi Chopard, 1940
29. Aphonoides kerzhneri Gorochov, 2007
30. Aphonoides khaoyai Gorochov, 2007
31. Aphonoides lunga Gorochov, 2008
32. Aphonoides medvedevi Gorochov, 1985 (2 subspecies)
33. Aphonoides morobe Gorochov, 2008
34. Aphonoides nicobarica Bhowmik, 1970
35. Aphonoides nok Gorochov, 2008
36. Aphonoides ocellaris (Saussure, 1878)
37. Aphonoides okapa Gorochov, 2008
38. Aphonoides orrori Gorochov, 2008
39. Aphonoides pallipes (Chopard, 1929)
40. Aphonoides papua Gorochov, 2008
41. Aphonoides paramplus Gorochov, 2008
42. Aphonoides peraki Gorochov, 2007
43. Aphonoides phetchaburi Gorochov, 2007
44. Aphonoides popovi Gorochov, 2007
45. Aphonoides pubescens Chopard, 1940
46. Aphonoides punctatus (Haan, 1844) - type species (as Gryllus punctatus Haan: locality Tondano, Sulawesi)
47. Aphonoides rufescens Ichikawa, 2001
48. Aphonoides sabahi Gorochov, 2007
49. Aphonoides sarawaki Gorochov, 2007
50. Aphonoides sepik Gorochov, 2008
51. Aphonoides siami Gorochov, 2007
52. Aphonoides simplex Gorochov, 2008
53. Aphonoides siveci Gorochov, 2007
54. Aphonoides tavuki Otte & Cowper, 2007
55. Aphonoides tawai Gorochov, 2007
56. Aphonoides tessellatus Chopard, 1969
57. Aphonoides vulgatus Gorochov, 2008
58. Aphonoides waigeo Gorochov, 2008
59. Aphonoides weeronga Otte & Alexander, 1983
60. Aphonoides wuyiensis Yin & Zhang, 2001
