= List of Hapithus species =

These 205 species belong to the genus Hapithus, true crickets.

== Hapithus species ==
- Hapithus abejas (Otte, D. & Perez-Gelabert, 2009)^{c g}
- Hapithus achicos (Otte, D. & Perez-Gelabert, 2009)^{c g}
- Hapithus acutus (Saussure, 1878)^{c g}
- Hapithus adaptos (Otte, D. & Perez-Gelabert, 2009)^{c g}
- Hapithus adorabilis (Otte, D. & Perez-Gelabert, 2009)^{c g}
- Hapithus aeschyntelos (Otte, D., 2006)^{c g}
- Hapithus agastos (Otte, D. & Perez-Gelabert, 2009)^{c g}
- Hapithus agitator Uhler, 1864^{i c g b} (restless bush cricket)
- Hapithus aigenetes Otte, D. & Perez-Gelabert, 2009^{c g}
- Hapithus akation Otte, D. & Perez-Gelabert, 2009^{c g}
- Hapithus alayoi (Otte, D. & Perez-Gelabert, 2009)^{c g}
- Hapithus anactorios (Otte, D. & Perez-Gelabert, 2009)^{c g}
- Hapithus annulicornis (Saussure, 1874)^{c g}
- Hapithus anoptos (Otte, D. & Perez-Gelabert, 2009)^{c g}
- Hapithus antillarum (Saussure, 1874)^{c g}
- Hapithus antiphonos (Otte, D. & Perez-Gelabert, 2009)^{c g}
- Hapithus aphenges (Otte, D. & Perez-Gelabert, 2009)^{c g}
- Hapithus aphetos (Otte, D. & Perez-Gelabert, 2009)^{c g}
- Hapithus apito (Otte, D. & Perez-Gelabert, 2009)^{c g}
- Hapithus atroapex Gorochov, 2017^{c g}
- Hapithus auditor Otte, D., 2006^{c g}
- Hapithus aztecus (Saussure, 1874)^{c g}
- Hapithus bacaju (Otte, D. & Perez-Gelabert, 2009)^{c g}
- Hapithus basilios (Otte, D. & Perez-Gelabert, 2009)^{c g}
- Hapithus bellatulus (Otte, D. & Perez-Gelabert, 2009)^{c g}
- Hapithus bellus Otte, D. & Perez-Gelabert, 2009^{c g}
- Hapithus brevipennis (Saussure, 1897)^{i c g b} (short-winged bush cricket)
- Hapithus cabralense Otte, D. & Perez-Gelabert, 2009^{c g}
- Hapithus canaster (Otte, D. & Perez-Gelabert, 2009)^{c g}
- Hapithus cantrix Otte, D. & Perez-Gelabert, 2009^{c g}
- Hapithus catacrotos (Otte, D. & Perez-Gelabert, 2009)^{c g}
- Hapithus cayennensis (Saussure, 1897)^{c g}
- Hapithus celadinos (Otte, D. & Perez-Gelabert, 2009)^{c g}
- Hapithus celerans (Otte, D. & Perez-Gelabert, 2009)^{c g}
- Hapithus cerbatana Otte, D. & Perez-Gelabert, 2009^{c g}
- Hapithus chronios (Otte, D. & Perez-Gelabert, 2009)^{c g}
- Hapithus conspersa (Saussure, 1874)^{c g}
- Hapithus corrugatus (Saussure, 1897)^{c g}
- Hapithus costalis (Saussure, 1878)^{c g}
- Hapithus cresbios (Otte, D. & Perez-Gelabert, 2009)^{c g}
- Hapithus crucis (Fabricius, 1787)^{c g}
- Hapithus ctypodes (Otte, D. & Perez-Gelabert, 2009)^{c g}
- Hapithus cucurucho Otte, D. & Perez-Gelabert, 2009^{c g}
- Hapithus cuphos (Otte, D. & Perez-Gelabert, 2009)^{c g}
- Hapithus curiosus (Otte, D., 2006)^{c g}
- Hapithus cydalimos (Otte, D. & Perez-Gelabert, 2009)^{c g}
- Hapithus demissus (Otte, D. & Perez-Gelabert, 2009)^{c g}
- Hapithus dignus Otte, D. & Perez-Gelabert, 2009^{c g}
- Hapithus diplastes (Walker, T.J., 1969)^{c g}
- Hapithus domingensis (Saussure, 1878)^{c g}
- Hapithus dubius (Caudell, 1922)^{c g}
- Hapithus dystheratos (Otte, D., 2015)^{c g}
- Hapithus echodes (Otte, D. & Perez-Gelabert, 2009)^{c g}
- Hapithus eclipes (Otte, D. & Perez-Gelabert, 2009)^{c g}
- Hapithus ecplecticos (Otte, D. & Perez-Gelabert, 2009)^{c g}
- Hapithus efferata (Otte, D. & Perez-Gelabert, 2009)^{c g}
- Hapithus egregius (Otte, D. & Perez-Gelabert, 2009)^{c g}
- Hapithus elisae Otte, D. & Perez-Gelabert, 2009^{c g}
- Hapithus elyunquensis (Otte, D., 2015)^{c g}
- Hapithus emeljanovi Gorochov, 1993^{c g}
- Hapithus empsychos (Otte, D. & Perez-Gelabert, 2009)^{c g}
- Hapithus energos (Otte, D. & Perez-Gelabert, 2009)^{c g}
- Hapithus epagogos (Otte, D. & Perez-Gelabert, 2009)^{c g}
- Hapithus epakros (Otte, D. & Perez-Gelabert, 2009)^{c g}
- Hapithus eperastos (Otte, D. & Perez-Gelabert, 2009)^{c g}
- Hapithus epholcos (Otte, D. & Perez-Gelabert, 2009)^{c g}
- Hapithus epidendrios (Otte, D. & Perez-Gelabert, 2009)^{c g}
- Hapithus epimeles (Otte, D. & Perez-Gelabert, 2009)^{c g}
- Hapithus eribombos (Otte, D. & Perez-Gelabert, 2009)^{c g}
- Hapithus errabundus (Otte, D. & Perez-Gelabert, 2009)^{c g}
- Hapithus erronea (Otte, D. & Perez-Gelabert, 2009)^{c g}
- Hapithus eucelados (Otte, D. & Perez-Gelabert, 2009)^{c g}
- Hapithus eumeles (Otte, D. & Perez-Gelabert, 2009)^{c g}
- Hapithus euprepes (Otte, D. & Perez-Gelabert, 2009)^{c g}
- Hapithus evanidus (Otte, D. & Perez-Gelabert, 2009)^{c g}
- Hapithus eveches (Otte, D. & Perez-Gelabert, 2009)^{c g}
- Hapithus exaitos (Otte, D. & Perez-Gelabert, 2009)^{c g}
- Hapithus facetus (Otte, D. & Perez-Gelabert, 2009)^{c g}
- Hapithus fascifer Gorochov, 2017^{c g}
- Hapithus fraudans (Otte, D. & Perez-Gelabert, 2009)^{c g}
- Hapithus fulvescens (Saussure, 1878)^{c g}
- Hapithus fusiformis (Walker, F., 1869)^{c g}
- Hapithus gaudialis (Otte, D. & Perez-Gelabert, 2009)^{c g}
- Hapithus gaumeri (Saussure, 1897)^{c g}
- Hapithus gavisa (Otte, D. & Perez-Gelabert, 2009)^{c g}
- Hapithus gegonos (Otte, D. & Perez-Gelabert, 2009)^{c g}
- Hapithus gratus (Otte, D. & Perez-Gelabert, 2009)^{c g}
- Hapithus gryllodes (Pallas, 1772)^{c g}
- Hapithus guanense (Otte, D. & Perez-Gelabert, 2009)^{c g}
- Hapithus gymnopta (Otte, D. & Perez-Gelabert, 2009)^{c g}
- Hapithus habros (Otte & Perez-Gelabert, 2009)
- Hapithus habros (Otte, 2006)
- Hapithus haiti Gorochov, 2017^{c g}
- Hapithus helvola (Saussure, 1874)^{c g}
- Hapithus honduras Gorochov, 2017^{c g}
- Hapithus idanos (Otte, D. & Perez-Gelabert, 2009)^{c g}
- Hapithus illectans (Otte, D. & Perez-Gelabert, 2009)^{c g}
- Hapithus illex (Otte, D. & Perez-Gelabert, 2009)^{c g}
- Hapithus importatus (Kevan, D.K.M., 1955)^{c g}
- Hapithus insulensis (Otte, D. & Perez-Gelabert, 2009)^{c g}
- Hapithus irroratus (Bolívar, I., 1888)^{c g}
- Hapithus jalisco Gorochov, 2017^{c g}
- Hapithus kerzhneri Gorochov, 1993^{c g}
- Hapithus killos (Otte, D., 2015)^{c g}
- Hapithus kirrhos (Otte, D. & Perez-Gelabert, 2009)^{c g}
- Hapithus klugei Gorochov, 2017^{c g}
- Hapithus kropion (Otte, D. & Perez-Gelabert, 2009)^{c g}
- Hapithus krugi (Saussure, 1878)^{c g}
- Hapithus krybelos (Otte, D. & Perez-Gelabert, 2009)^{c g}
- Hapithus lacandona Gorochov, 2017^{c g}
- Hapithus latifrons (Rehn, J.A.G., 1909)^{c g}
- Hapithus libratus Otte, D., 2006^{c g}
- Hapithus longivivax (Otte, D. & Perez-Gelabert, 2009)^{c g}
- Hapithus lucreciae Otte, D. & Perez-Gelabert, 2009^{c g}
- Hapithus luteolira (Walker, T.J., 1969)^{c g}
- Hapithus mabuya Otte, D. & Perez-Gelabert, 2009^{c g}
- Hapithus maculata (Desutter-Grandcolas & Bland, 2003)^{c g}
- Hapithus maroniensis (Chopard, 1912)^{c g}
- Hapithus maya (Saussure, 1897)^{c g}
- Hapithus melodius T. J. Walker, 1977^{i c g b} (musical bush cricket)
- Hapithus melodos (Otte, D. & Perez-Gelabert, 2009)^{c g}
- Hapithus mexicanus (Saussure, 1897)^{c g}
- Hapithus montanus (Saussure, 1897)^{c g}
- Hapithus mundula (Otte, D. & Perez-Gelabert, 2009)^{c g}
- Hapithus musica (Saussure, 1897)^{c g}
- Hapithus mythicos Otte, D. & Perez-Gelabert, 2009^{c g}
- Hapithus nablista (Saussure, 1897)^{c g}
- Hapithus nanion (Otte, D. & Perez-Gelabert, 2009)^{c g}
- Hapithus naskreckii (Otte, D. & Perez-Gelabert, 2009)^{c g}
- Hapithus nigrifrons (Walker, T.J., 1969)^{c g}
- Hapithus nocticola (Otte, D. & Perez-Gelabert, 2009)^{c g}
- Hapithus noctimonos (Otte, D. & Perez-Gelabert, 2009)^{c g}
- Hapithus nocturus (Otte, D. & Perez-Gelabert, 2009)^{c g}
- Hapithus nodulosus Strohecker, 1953^{c g}
- Hapithus obscurella (Walker, F., 1869)^{c g}
- Hapithus ocellaris (Saussure, 1897)^{c g}
- Hapithus onesimos Otte, D., 2006^{c g}
- Hapithus orimonos (Otte, D. & Perez-Gelabert, 2009)^{c g}
- Hapithus oriobates (Otte, D. & Perez-Gelabert, 2009)^{c g}
- Hapithus palans (Otte, D. & Perez-Gelabert, 2009)^{c g}
- Hapithus palenque Gorochov, 2017^{c g}
- Hapithus pannychios (Otte, D. & Perez-Gelabert, 2009)^{c g}
- Hapithus paraxynticos (Otte, D. & Perez-Gelabert, 2009)^{c g}
- Hapithus pelliciens (Otte, D. & Perez-Gelabert, 2009)^{c g}
- Hapithus perennans (Otte, D. & Perez-Gelabert, 2009)^{c g}
- Hapithus periphantos (Otte, D. & Perez-Gelabert, 2009)^{c g}
- Hapithus phasma (Otte, D. & Perez-Gelabert, 2009)^{c g}
- Hapithus piedrasense (Otte, D. & Perez-Gelabert, 2009)^{c g}
- Hapithus pilosa (Bolívar, I., 1888)^{c g}
- Hapithus pisina (Otte, D. & Perez-Gelabert, 2009)^{c g}
- Hapithus planodes (Otte, D. & Perez-Gelabert, 2009)^{c g}
- Hapithus planus (Walker, F., 1869)^{c g}
- Hapithus polymechanus Otte, D. & Perez-Gelabert, 2009^{c g}
- Hapithus polyplanes (Otte, D. & Perez-Gelabert, 2009)^{c g}
- Hapithus polypsophos (Otte, D. & Perez-Gelabert, 2009)^{c g}
- Hapithus properatos (Otte, D. & Perez-Gelabert, 2009)^{c g}
- Hapithus prosplatos (Otte, D. & Perez-Gelabert, 2009)^{c g}
- Hapithus protos Otte, D. & Perez-Gelabert, 2009^{c g}
- Hapithus proximus Gorochov, 2017^{c g}
- Hapithus pudens (Otte, D. & Perez-Gelabert, 2009)^{c g}
- Hapithus regificus (Otte, D. & Perez-Gelabert, 2009)^{c g}
- Hapithus regillus (Otte, D. & Perez-Gelabert, 2009)^{c g}
- Hapithus rodriguezi (Saussure, 1874)^{c g}
- Hapithus rolphi (Saussure, 1878)^{c g}
- Hapithus saba (Otte, D. & Perez-Gelabert, 2009)^{c g}
- Hapithus sabaensis (Otte, D. & Perez-Gelabert, 2009)^{c g}
- Hapithus sajoma (Otte, D. & Perez-Gelabert, 2009)^{c g}
- Hapithus saltator (Uhler, 1864)^{c g}
- Hapithus samanense Otte, D. & Perez-Gelabert, 2009^{c g}
- Hapithus saukros (Otte, D. & Perez-Gelabert, 2009)^{c g}
- Hapithus saulcyi (Guérin-Méneville, 1844)^{c g}
- Hapithus saussurei (Desutter-Grandcolas, 2003)^{c g}
- Hapithus selva Gorochov, 2017^{c g}
- Hapithus semnos (Otte, D. & Perez-Gelabert, 2009)^{c g}
- Hapithus sibilans (Saussure, 1878)^{c g}
- Hapithus similis (Walker, F., 1869)^{c g}
- Hapithus solivagus (Otte, D. & Perez-Gelabert, 2009)^{c g}
- Hapithus spectrum (Otte, D. & Perez-Gelabert, 2009)^{c g}
- Hapithus symphonos Otte, D., 2006^{c g}
- Hapithus taciturnus (Otte, D., 2006)^{c g}
- Hapithus tenuicornis (Walker, F., 1869)^{c g}
- Hapithus thaumasios (Otte, D. & Perez-Gelabert, 2009)^{c g}
- Hapithus thorybodes (Otte, D. & Perez-Gelabert, 2009)^{c g}
- Hapithus tibialis (Saussure, 1897)^{c g}
- Hapithus tintinnans (Otte, D. & Perez-Gelabert, 2009)^{c g}
- Hapithus trepida (Otte, D. & Perez-Gelabert, 2009)^{c g}
- Hapithus tricornis (Walker, T.J., 1969)^{c g}
- Hapithus turbulenta (Otte, D. & Perez-Gelabert, 2009)^{c g}
- Hapithus tychaeos (Otte, D. & Perez-Gelabert, 2009)^{c g}
- Hapithus tyrannicos (Otte, D. & Perez-Gelabert, 2009)^{c g}
- Hapithus tyrannos (Otte, D. & Perez-Gelabert, 2009)^{c g}
- Hapithus unicolor (Olivier, G.A., 1791)^{c g}
- Hapithus vaga (Otte, D. & Perez-Gelabert, 2009)^{c}
- Hapithus vagus Morse, 1916^{i c g}
- Hapithus valida (Walker, F., 1869)^{c g}
- Hapithus vexativa (Otte, D. & Perez-Gelabert, 2009)^{c g}
- Hapithus vigil (Otte, D. & Perez-Gelabert, 2009)^{c g}
- Hapithus vigilax (Otte, D. & Perez-Gelabert, 2009)^{c g}
- Hapithus vivus (Otte, D. & Perez-Gelabert, 2009)^{c g}
- Hapithus vocatus (Otte, D., 2015)^{c g}
- Hapithus volatus (Otte, D., 2015)^{c g}
- Hapithus vulgaris Gorochov, 2017^{c g}
- Hapithus xadani Gorochov, 2017^{c g}
- Hapithus xouthos (Otte, D. & Perez-Gelabert, 2009)^{c g}
- Hapithus zatheos (Otte, D. & Perez-Gelabert, 2009)^{c g}

Data sources: i = ITIS, c = Catalogue of Life, g = GBIF, b = Bugguide.net
