= Hapithus brevipennis =

Scientific classification
- Domain: Eukaryota
- Kingdom: Animalia
- Phylum: Arthropoda
- Class: Insecta
- Order: Orthoptera
- Suborder: Ensifera
- Family: Oecanthidae
- Supertribe: Hapithidi
- Tribe: Hapithini
- Genus: Hapithus
- Species: H. brevipennis

Binomial name
- Hapithus brevipennis (Saussure, 1897)

Species of cricket

Hapithus brevipennis, the short-winged bush cricket, is a species of bush cricket in the family Gryllidae. It is found in North America.
