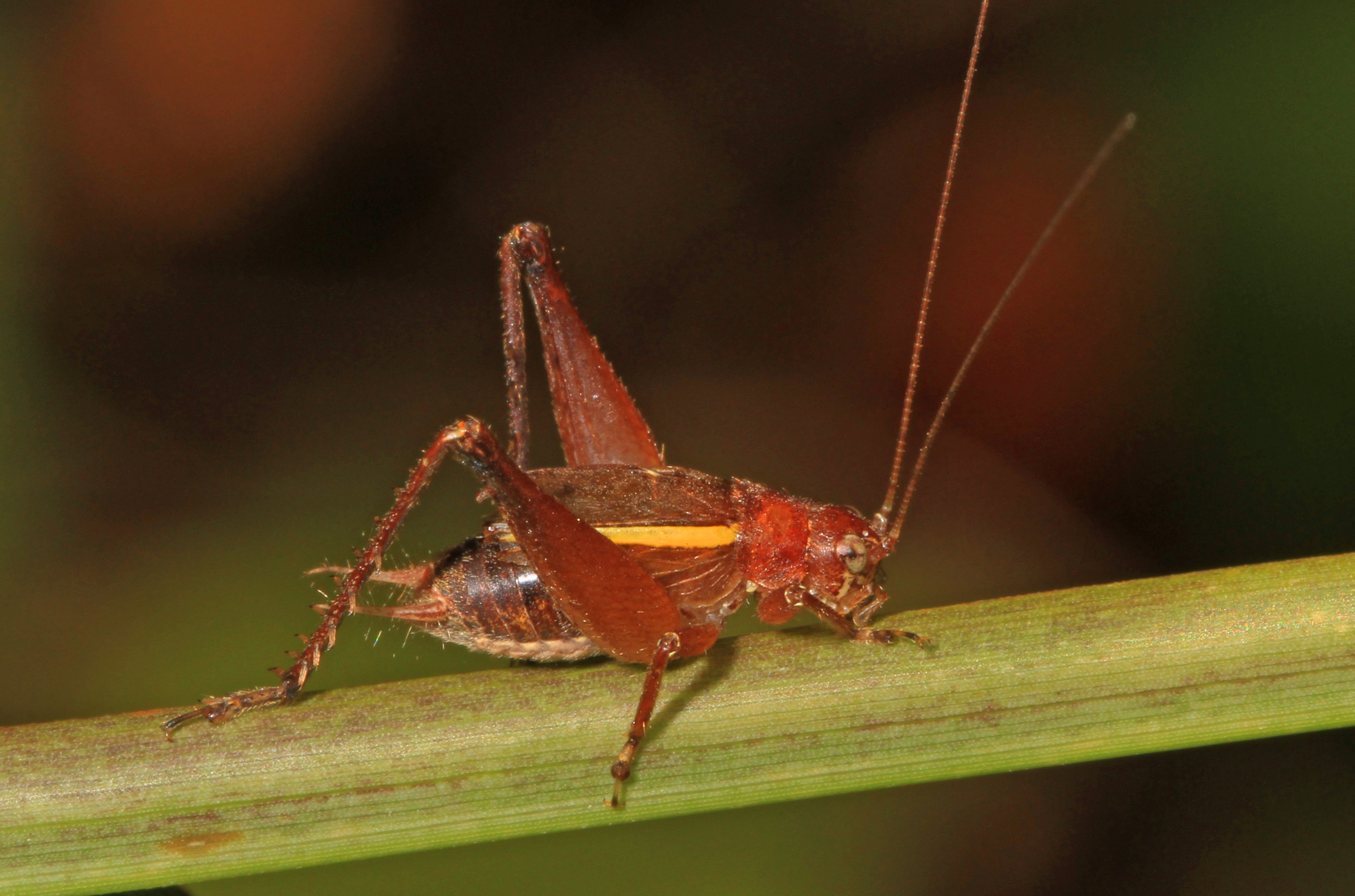

Scientific classification
- Kingdom: Animalia
- Phylum: Arthropoda
- Clade: Pancrustacea
- Class: Insecta
- Order: Orthoptera
- Suborder: Ensifera
- Family: Oecanthidae
- Subfamily: Podoscirtinae
- Supertribe: Hapithidi
- Tribe: Hapithini
- Genus: Hapithus
- Species: H. agitator

Binomial name
- Hapithus agitator Uhler, 1864

= Hapithus agitator =

Species of cricket

Hapithus agitator is a species of cricket in the genus Hapithus ("flightless bush crickets"), in the subfamily Hapithinae ("bush crickets"). A common name for it is "restless bush cricket". It is found in North America.

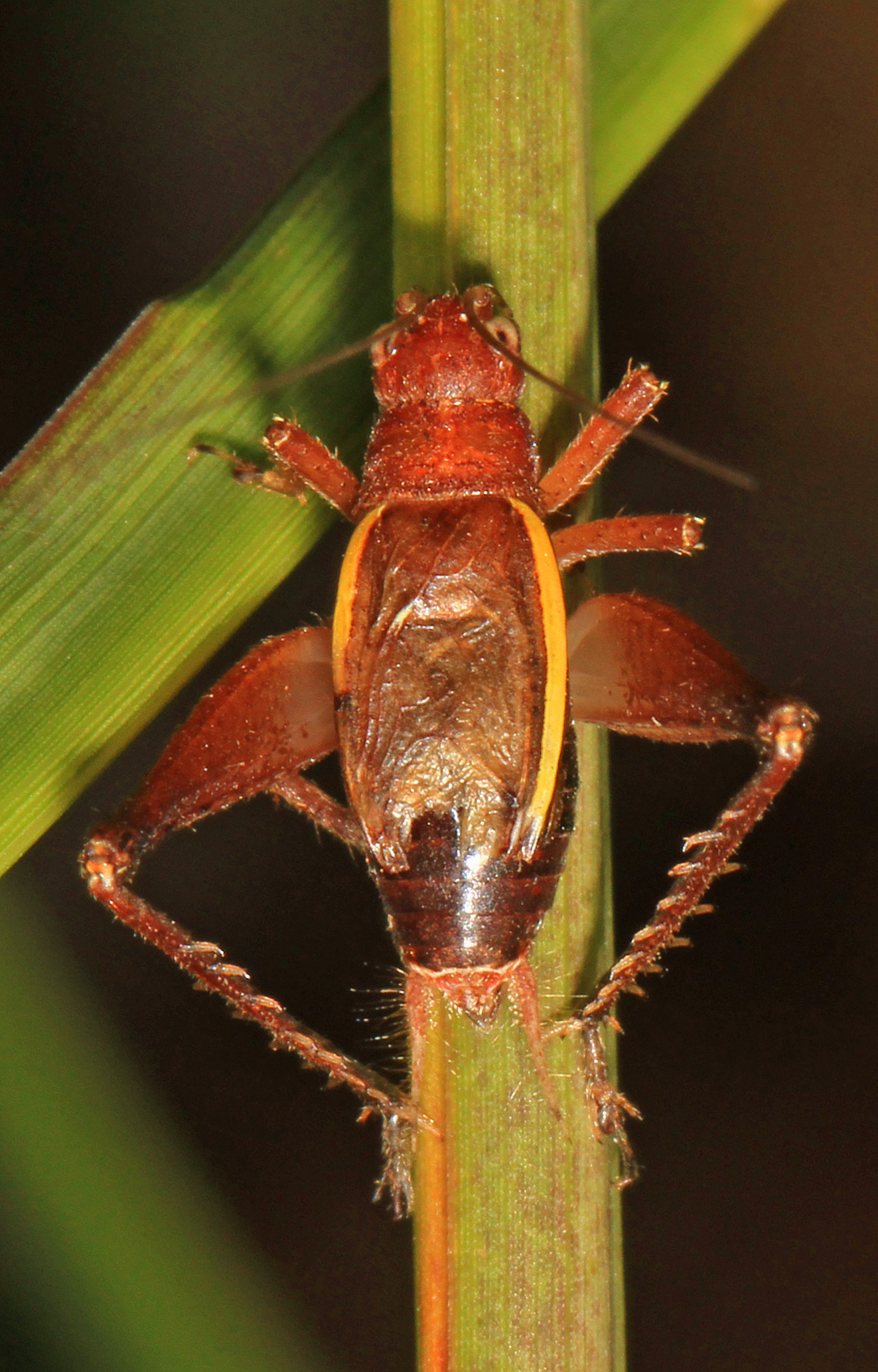

== Breeding ==
Males of this species make calls not to attract females, like other similar organisms do; they themselves choose with whom to mate thanks to chemical interactions which occur when both individuals connect their antennas together. When courting, the male silently vibrates its wings. The female may gnaw at the tegmina of the male during mating. This is theorized to be a strategy to keep the female in place longer during mating for better reproductive success.
