= List of Orthoptera of Sri Lanka =

Sri Lanka is a tropical island situated close to the southern tip of India. The invertebrate fauna is as large as it is common to other regions of the world. There are about 2 million species of arthropods found in the world, and still is counting.

The following list is about Orthopterans recorded in Sri Lanka.

== Orthopterans ==
Phylum: Arthropoda
Class: Insecta
Order: Orthoptera

The Orthoptera order of insects includes the grasshoppers, crickets, cave crickets, Jerusalem crickets, katydids, wētā, lubber, Acrida, and locusts. More than 27,000 species are distributed worldwide. Many insects in this order have paurometabolous or incomplete metamorphosis, and produce sound (known as a "stridulation") by rubbing their wings against each other or their legs, the wings or legs containing rows of corrugated bumps. The tympanum or ear is located in the front tibia in crickets, mole crickets, and katydids, and on the first abdominal segment in the grasshoppers and locusts. These organisms use vibrations to locate other individuals. There are two suborders and 235 subfamilies are in this order.

The following list provide the orthopterans currently identified in Sri Lanka. One of Sri Lanka's leading naturalist and expert on orthopterans, George Morrison Reid Henry, who was born in Sri Lanka, was appointed as Assistant in Systematic Entomology at Colombo National Museum from 1913-1946. He started much work on many micro arthropods including orthoptera as well. But the most comprehensive work confined to orthoptera was done by G. M. Henry, though no single monograph of Sri Lankan species is available. The world catalogues of Otte provide up-dated nomenclature and classification. In 2020, a new pygmy grasshopper was discovered from Sinharaja rainforest.

According to Sandrasagara, (1949 to 1954); and Chopard, (1936), 350 species of orthopterans identified from Sri Lanka.

Endemic species are denoted as E.

=== Family: Tridactylidae - Pygmy mole crickets ===
- Tridactylus variegatus
- Tridactylus nigroaenus
- Tridactylus curlus
- Tridactylus quadrimaculata
- Tridactylus thoracicus
- Tridactylus ceylonicus
- Xya frontomaculatus
- Xya nigripennis
- Xya opaca
- Xya riparia

=== Family: Acrididae ===
==== Sub family: Gomphocerinae - Slant-faced grasshoppers ====
- Dnopherula sp.

==== Sub family: Acridinae - Silent slant-faced grasshoppers ====
- Acrida exaltata

==== Sub family: Oedipodinae - Band-winged grasshoppers ====
- Aiolopus thalassinus
- Gastrimargus africanus

==== Sub family: Hemiacridinae ====
- Spathosternum prasiniferum

==== Sub family: Cyrtacanthacridinae - Bird grasshoppers ====
- Cyrtacanthacris tatarica

==== Sub family: Eyprepocnemidinae ====
- Cyrtacanthacris tatarica

==== Sub family: Catantopinae - Spur-throated grasshoppers ====
- Xenocatantops humilis
- Catantops pinguis

=== Family: Chorotypidae ===
- Orchetypus ceylonicus

=== Family: Gryllacrididae - Leaf-rolling crickets ===
- Brachyntheisogryllacris punicea
- Diaphanogryllacris aequalis
- Neanias squamatus
- Pardogryllacris pardalina
- Pardogryllacris spuria

=== Family: Gryllidae - Crickets ===
==== Sub family:Gryllinae - Field crickets ====
- Brachytrypes orientalis
- Gymnogryllus erythrocephalus
- Phonarellus humeralis
- Itaropsis tenellus
- Gryllus bimaculatus
- Gryllulus testaceus
- Gryllulus mitratus
- Gryllulus configuratus
- Gryllulus flavus
- Gryllulus confirmatus
- Gryllulus bucharicus
- Gryllulus brevicauda
- Gryllulus blennus
- Gryllulus pallipes
- Gryllodes sigillatus
- Gryllodes supplicans
- Gryllopsis falconneti
- Nemobiodes laeviceps
- Nemobiodes nigrocephalus
- Cophogryllus martini
- Scapsipedus aspersus
- Scapsipedus ceylonicus
- Coiblemmus compactus
- Loxoblemmus equestris
- Loxoblemmus longipalpis
- Staphoblemmus humbertiellus
- Scapsipedoides macrocephalus
- Scapsipedoides apterus
- Teleogryllus mitratus
- Teratodes monticollis
- Landreva clara
- Landreva subaptera
- Jareta insignis
- Landreva angustifrons
- Hemilandreva lamellipennis

==== Sub family:Nemobiinae - Ground crickets ====
- Paranemobius pictus
- Ptreonemobius concolor
- Ptreonemobius birmanus
- Ptreonemobius vagus
- Ptreonemobius taprobanensis
- Ptreonemobius fascipes
- Ptreonemobius csikii
- Ptreonemobius bicolor
- Scottia ceylonica
- Polionemobius taprobanensis
- Neanias squamatus

==== Sub family:Trigoniinae ====
- Trigonidium cicindeloides
- Trigonidium humbertianum
- Metioche unicolor
- Metiochodes greeni
- Metiochodes trilineatus
- Amusurgus oedemeroides
- Amusurgus speculifer
- Paranaxipha ornatipes
- Trigonidomorpha fuscifrons
- Homoeoxipha lycoides
- Anaxipha pubescens
- Anaxipha longipennis
- Anaxipha henryi

==== Sub family:Myrmecophilinae - Ant crickets ====
- Myrmecophila escherichi
- Myrmecophilellus pilipes

==== Sub family:Pentacentrinae - Anomalous crickets ====
- Pentacentrus pulchellus
- Homologryllus depressus

==== Sub family:Oecanthinae - Tree crickets ====
- Oecanthus indicus
- Oecanthus rufescens
- Oecanthus henryi

==== Sub family:Itarinae ====
- Heterotrypus vicinus
- Heterotrypus elegans

==== Sub family:Eneopterinae - Bush crickets ====
- Cardiodactylus praecipuus

==== Sub family:Podoscirtinae ====
- Madasumma marginipennis
- Madasumma greeni
- Madasumma albonotata
- Madasumma valida
- Madasumma varipennis
- Mnesibulus pallipes
- Euscyrtus hemelytrus
- Euscyrtus concinnus
- Euscyrtus necydaloides
- Euscyrtus laminifer
- Euscyrtus perforatus
- Patiscus quadripunctatus

=== Family:Gryllotalpidae - Mole crickets ===
- Gryllotalpa africana

=== Family:Mogoplistidae - Scaly crickets ===
- Cycloptiloides orientalis
- Ornebius guerini
- Ornebius varipennis
- Derectaotus ceylonicus
- Derectaotus henryi
- Derectaotus palpatus
- Ectotoderus ceylonicus

=== Family:Myrmecophilidae - Ant-loving crickets ===
- Myrmecophilellus pilipes
- Myrmecophilus escherichi

=== Family:Tetrigidae - Pygmy locusts ===
- Andriana hancocki
- Apterotettix obtusus
- Cingalotettix pterugodes
- Cladonotus bhaskari
- Coptotettix conspersus
- Coptotettix fossulatus
- Coptotettix rugosus
- Coptotettix testaceus
- Criotettix miliarius
- Deltonotus subcucullatus
- Ergatettix dorsifera
- Eucriotettix tricarinatus
- Euparatettix parvus
- Euparatettix variabilis
- Gavialidium crocodilum
- Hedotettix attenuatus
- Hedotettix festivus
- Hedotettix gracilis
- Loxilobus acutus
- Loxilobus novaebrittanniae
- Paratettix cingalensis
- Paratettix variegatus
- Spadotettix fletcheri
- Systoloderus greeni
- Tettilobus pelops
- Tetrix abortus
- Tettix atypicalis
- Tetrix discalis
- Xistrells stylsts

==== Sub family:Scelimeninae ====
- Criotettix curticornis
- Criotettix miliarius
- Criotettix subulatus
- Eucriotettix tricarinatus
- Eucriotettix spinilobus
- Euscelimena gavialis
- Euscelimena logani
- Loxilobus acutus
  - Loxilobus acutus acutus
- Euscelimena logani

=== Family:Phalangopsidae ===
==== Sub family:Phalangopsinae - Spider crickets ====
- Arachnomimus annulicornis
- Arachnomimus bicolor
- Arachnomimus brevipalpis
- Arachnomimus nietneri
- Luzaropsis confusa
- Luzaropsis ferruginea
- Luzaropsis henryi
- Luzaropsis omissa
- Paragryllodes ceylonicus
- Paragryllodes gravelyi
- Seychellsia ceylonica

=== Family:Podoscirtidae ===
- Ceyloria latissima
- Ceyloria vicina
- Euscyrtus concinnus
- Euscyrtus hemelytrus
- Euscyrtus laminifer
- Euscyrtus necydaloides
- Euscyrtus nigrifrons
- Heterotrypus elegans
- Homologryllus depressus
- Madasumma albonotata
- Madasumma valida
- Mnesibulus pallipes
- Patiscus quadripunctatus
- Pentacentrus pulchellus
- Poliotrella greeni
- Prozvenella saussureana
- Varitrella varipennis

=== Family:Pyrgomorphidae - Gaudy grasshoppers ===
- Aularches miliaris
- Atractomorpha crenulata
- Chrotogonus oxypterus
- Orthacris ceylonica
- Orthacris filiformis

=== Family:Stenopelmatidae - Jerusalem crickets ===
- Oryctopus lagenipes

=== Family:Tettigoniidae - Katydids ===
- Acrodonta subaptera
- Paramorsimus robustus
- Brunneriana ceylonica
- Brunneriana opaca
- Cratioma myops
- Euconocephalus incertus
- Mecopoda elongata
- Pseudophaneroptera turbida
- Vetralla difformis

==== Sub family:Conocephalinae - Meadow katydids ====
- Ruspolia differens
- Conocephalus maculatus
- Conocephalus signatus

==== Sub family:Pseudophyllinae - True katydids ====
- Cratioma sp.
- Olcinia sp.
- Onomarchus cretaceus
- Sathrophyllia rugosa
- Zabalius aridus

==== Sub family:Phaneropterinae - Phaneropterine katydids ====
- Deflorita deflorita
- Ducetia ceylanica
- Ducetia japonica
- Elimaea carinata
- Elimaea melanocantha
- Elimaea nigrosignata
- Himertula marmorata
- Holochlora brevifissa
- Letana inflata
- Molpa bilineolata
- Phaneroptera gracilis
- Pseudophaneroptera turbida
