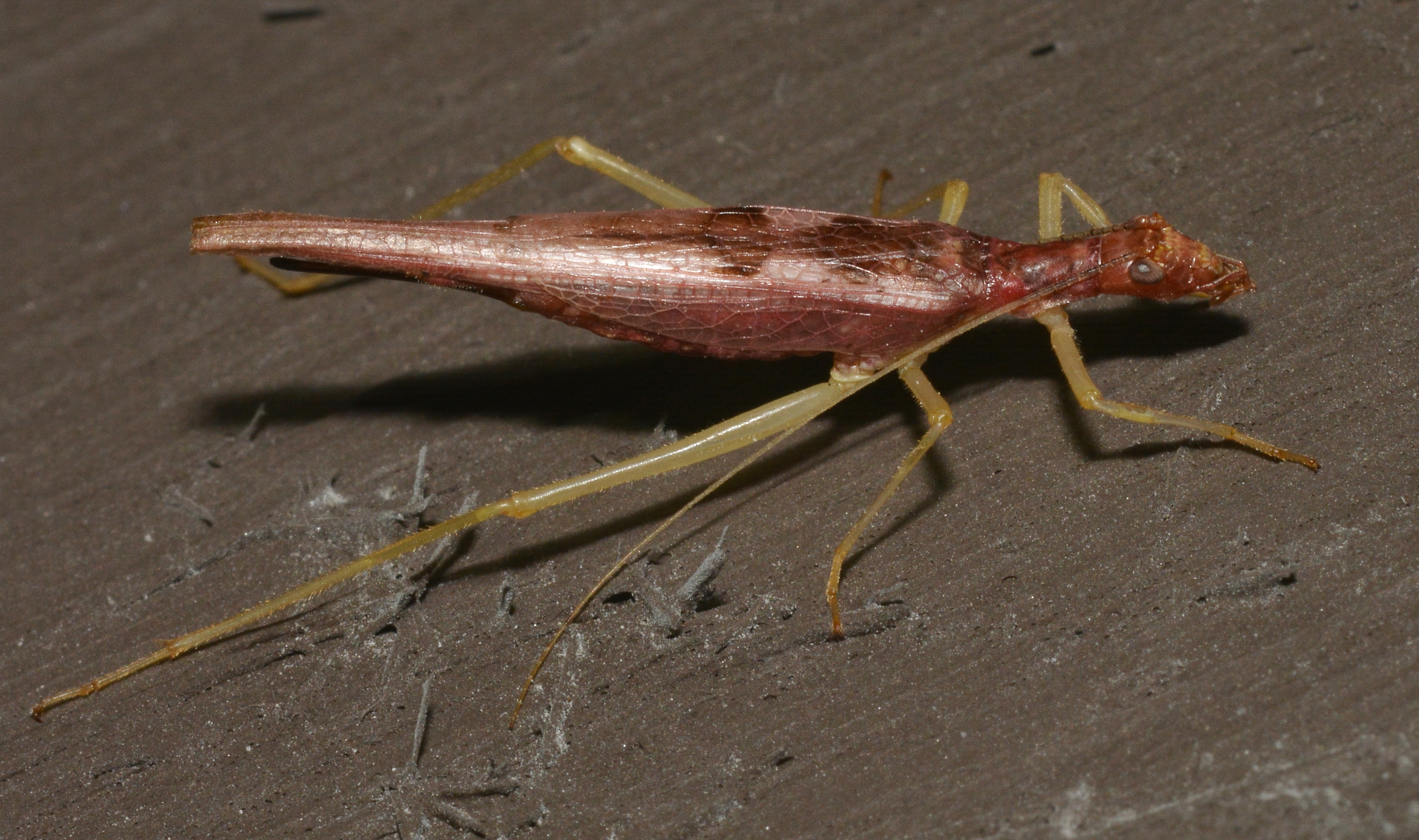
- Two-spotted Tree Cricket

Scientific classification
- Kingdom: Animalia
- Phylum: Arthropoda
- Class: Insecta
- Order: Orthoptera
- Suborder: Ensifera
- Family: Oecanthidae
- Subfamily: Oecanthinae
- Tribe: Xabeini
- Genus: Neoxabea; Kirby, 1906

= Neoxabea =

Genus of crickets

Neoxabea is a genus of smooth-legged tree crickets in the family Oecanthidae. There are about 14 described species in Neoxabea.

== Species ==
These 14 species belong to the genus Neoxabea:

- Neoxabea astales Walker, 1967
- Neoxabea bipunctata (De Geer, 1773) (two-spotted tree cricket)
- Neoxabea brevipes Rehn, 1913
- Neoxabea cerrojesusensis Collins & van den Berghe, 2014
- Neoxabea enodis Walker, 1967
- Neoxabea femorata Walker, 1967
- Neoxabea formosa (Walker, 1869)
- Neoxabea lepta Walker, 1967
- Neoxabea meridionalis Bruner, 1916
- Neoxabea mexicana Collins & Velazco-Macias, 2021
- Neoxabea obscurifrons Bruner, 1916
- Neoxabea ottei Collins & van den Berghe, 2014
- Neoxabea quadrula Walker, 1967
- Neoxabea trinodosa Hebard, 1928
