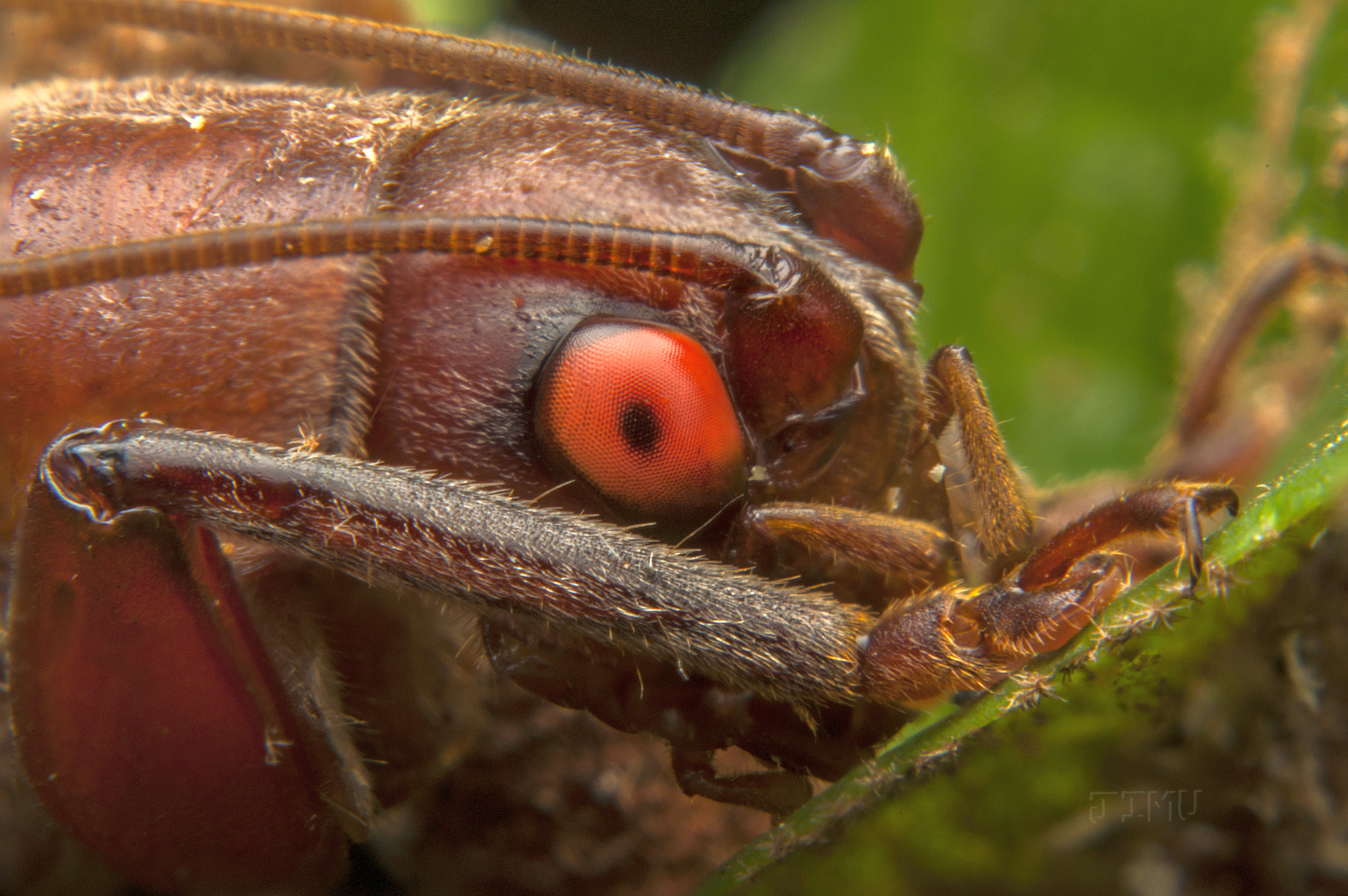
- Tafalisca lurida

Scientific classification
- Kingdom: Animalia
- Phylum: Arthropoda
- Clade: Pancrustacea
- Class: Insecta
- Order: Orthoptera
- Suborder: Ensifera
- Family: Oecanthidae
- Subfamily: Tafaliscinae
- Tribe: Tafaliscini
- Genus: Tafalisca
- Species: T. lurida

Binomial name
- Tafalisca lurida F. Walker, 1869

= Tafalisca lurida =

Species of cricket

Tafalisca lurida, known generally as the silent bush cricket or robust bush cricket, is a species of true cricket in the family Gryllidae. It is found in the Caribbean Sea, North America, and the Caribbean.
