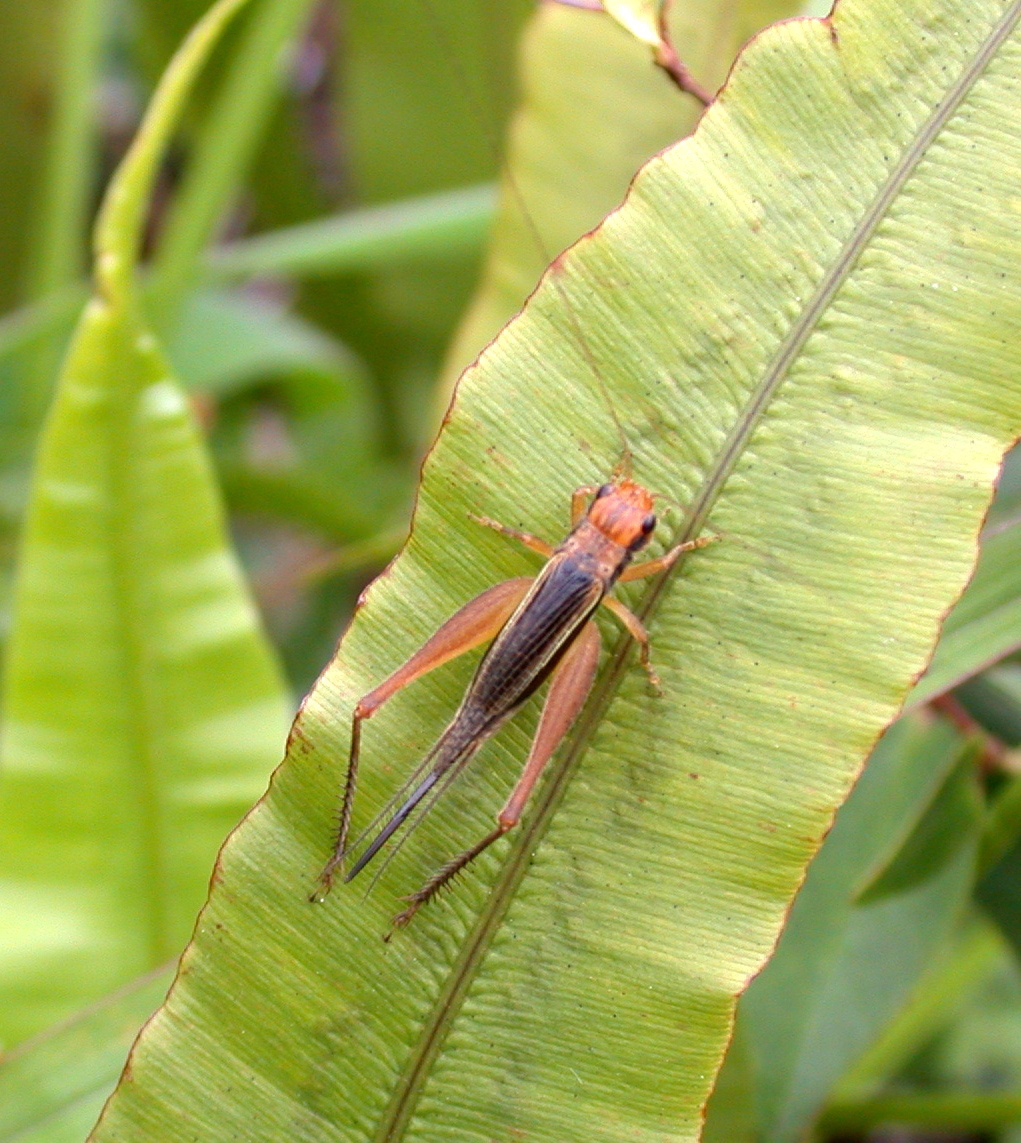
- Patiscus thaiensis

Scientific classification
- Kingdom: Animalia
- Phylum: Arthropoda
- Clade: Pancrustacea
- Class: Insecta
- Order: Orthoptera
- Suborder: Ensifera
- Family: Oecanthidae
- Subfamily: Euscyrtinae
- Genus: Patiscus; Stål, 1877

Synonyms
- Pasticus Bruner, 1915

= Patiscus =

Genus of crickets

Asian insects in the genus Patiscus are sometimes called "pale grass crickets"; this genus is placed in the subfamily Euscyrtinae and was erected by Carl Stål in 1877. Species records are from India, China, Taiwan, Indochina, the Philippines and New Guinea.

== Species ==
The Orthoptera Species File currently (April 2026) includes:

1. Patiscus brevipennis Chopard, 1969
2. Patiscus cephalotes (Saussure, 1878)
3. Patiscus dorsalis (Stål, 1877) - type species (as Euscirtus dorsalis Stål; locality: Philippines)
4. Patiscus elegans Otte, 2006
5. Patiscus maesoi (Bolívar, 1889)
6. Patiscus malayanus Chopard, 1969
7. Patiscus nagatomii Oshiro, 1999
8. Patiscus papuanus Gorochov, 1988
9. Patiscus quadripunctatus Bolívar, 1900
10. Patiscus tagalicus (Stål, 1877)
11. Patiscus thaiensis Ingrisch, 1987
