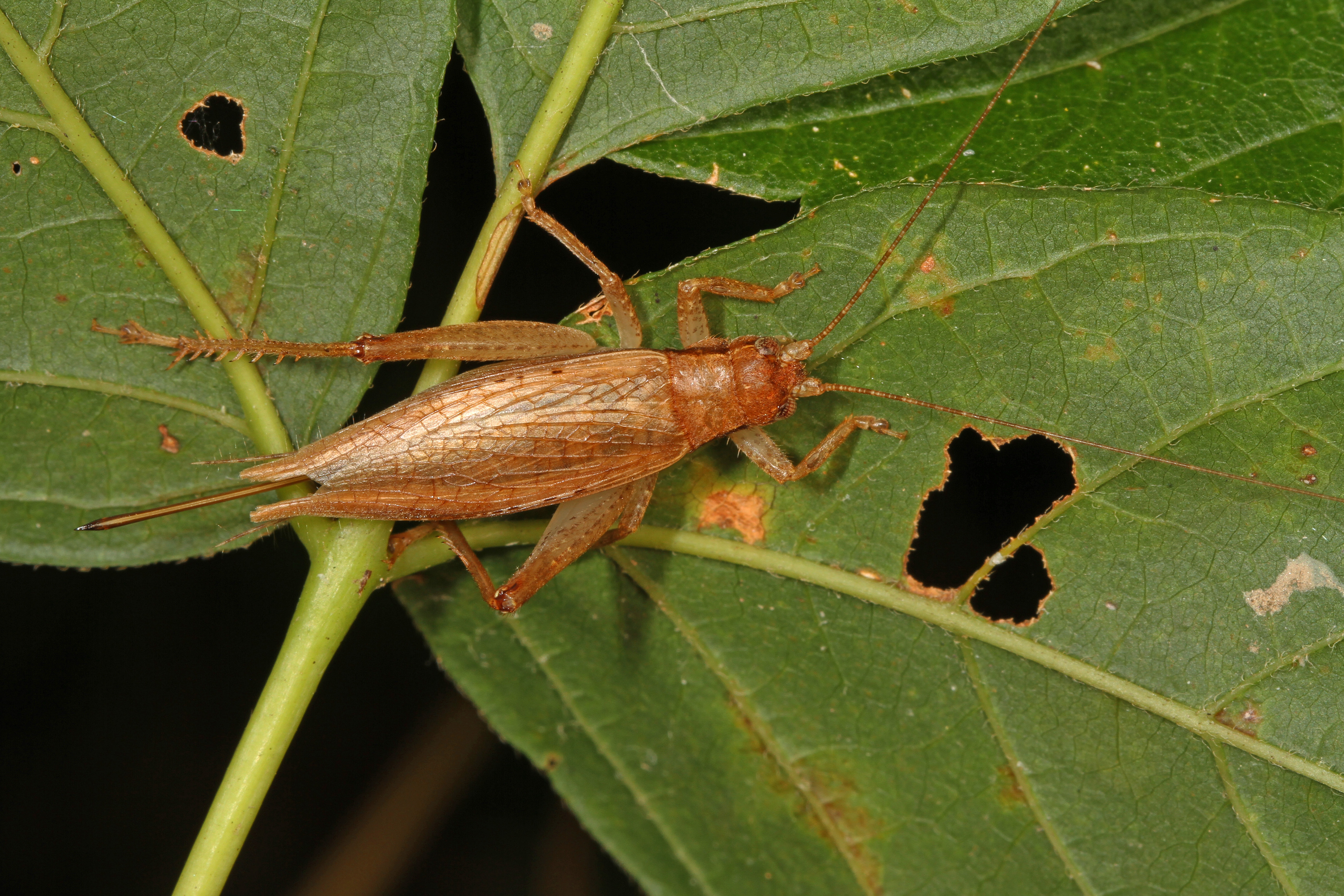
- Jumping Bush Cricket, Hapithus saltator

Scientific classification
- Kingdom: Animalia
- Phylum: Arthropoda
- Clade: Pancrustacea
- Class: Insecta
- Order: Orthoptera
- Suborder: Ensifera
- Family: Oecanthidae
- Genus: Hapithus
- Species: H. saltator

Binomial name
- Hapithus saltator (Uhler, 1864)

= Hapithus saltator =

Species of cricket

Hapithus saltator, the jumping bush cricket, is a species of cricket in the family Gryllidae. It is found in North America.

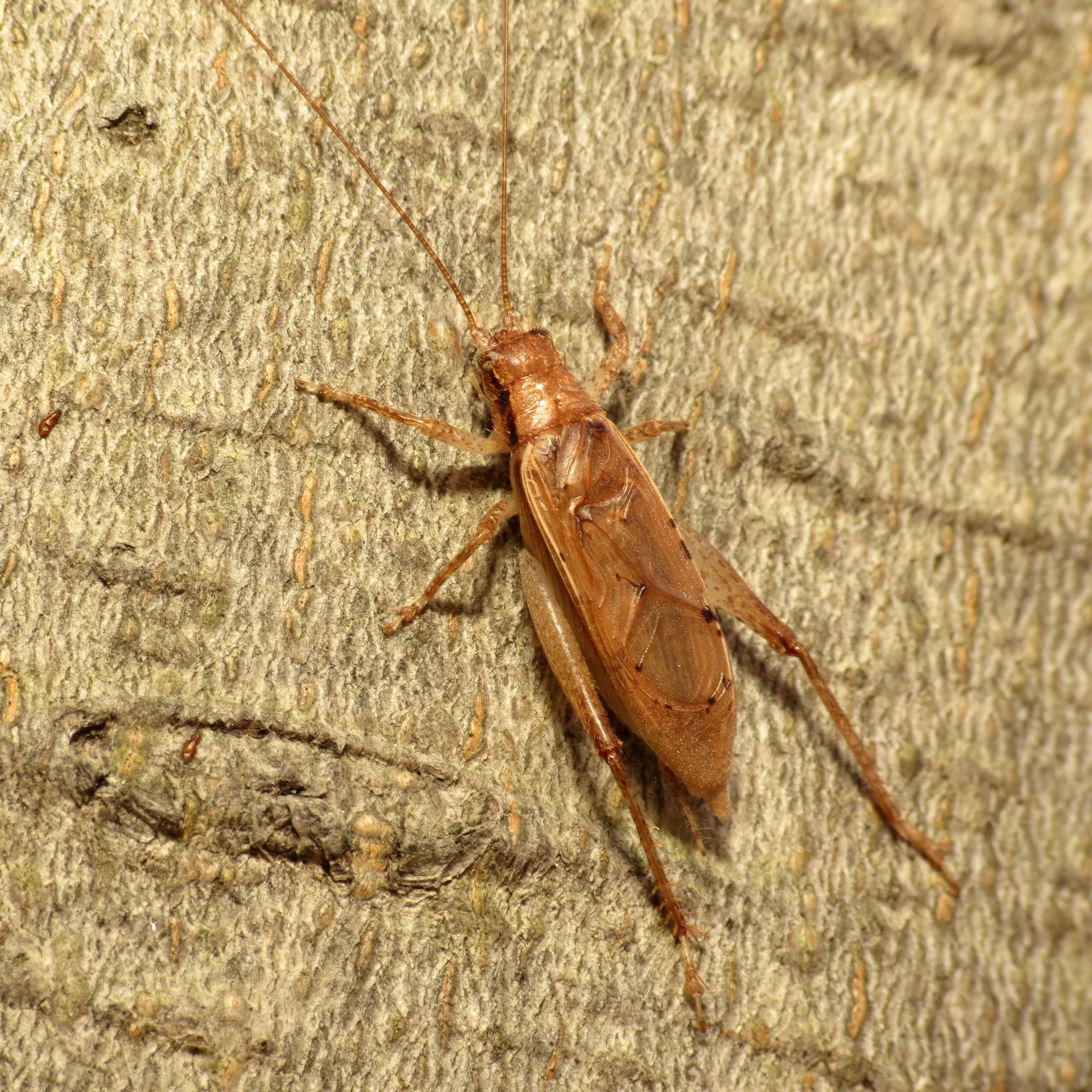
Jumping Bush Cricket, Hapithus saltator
