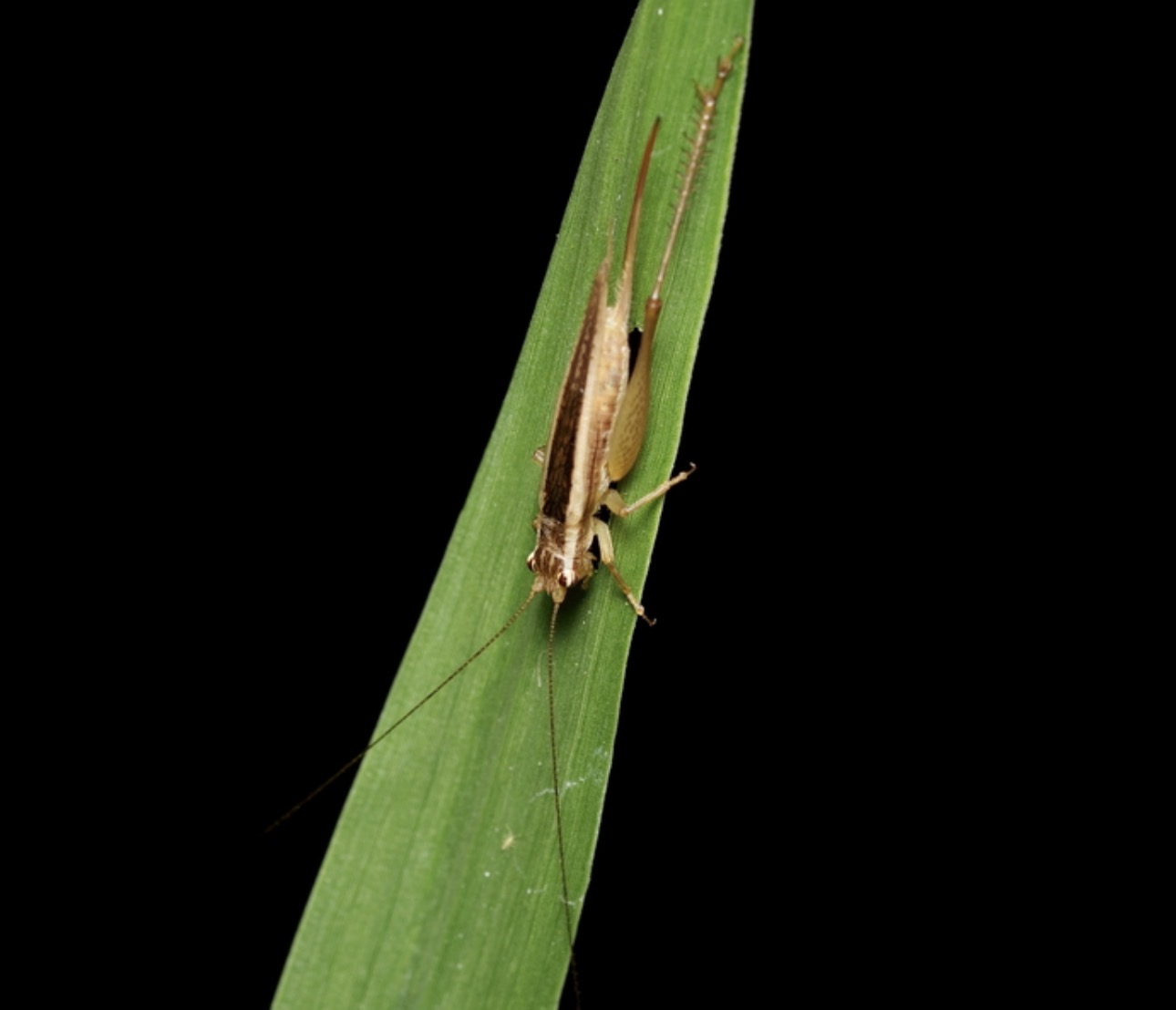
- Euscyrtus concinnus in Singapore

Scientific classification
- Kingdom: Animalia
- Phylum: Arthropoda
- Class: Insecta
- Order: Orthoptera
- Suborder: Ensifera
- Family: Oecanthidae
- Subfamily: Euscyrtinae
- Genus: Euscyrtus
- Species: E. concinnus

Binomial name
- Euscyrtus concinnus (Haan, 1844)

Synonyms
- Gryllus concinnus Haan, 1844

= Euscyrtus concinnus =

Species of cricket

Euscyrtus concinnus is a species of cricket found in South and Southeast Asia, including Sri Lanka, India, Bangladesh, Indonesia (Sumatra, Java, Borneo, Sulawesi), Thailand, and Vietnam.

== Description ==
Adults are small. The opening of the tibiae on each side is oval. The elytra cover two-thirds of the abdomen and are livid or brownish like the pronotum, with pale lateral angles. The wings exceed twice the length of the elytra and surpass the abdomen. The head is yellow, brown above, with two livid lines. The legs are tawny; the hind femora surpass the abdomen and have a very narrow apex. The hind tibiae have 9 spines on each side. The female's ovipositor is linear and about the length of the body.

The adult is pale brown, measuring 1.0 to 1.8 cm long, with long antennae and legs. The female is larger than the male and has a long, spear-shaped ovipositor. Nymphs are pale brown, resembling smaller versions of the adults but with wing pads, and have a pair of brown to black spots along the abdomen. Eggs are elongate-ovoid, whitish when newly laid, turning orange with age.

== Ecology and habitat ==
This species usually feeds on leaves, creating irregular to longitudinal exit holes. When feeding damage is excessive, they can cause deadheart by cutting the central portions of leaf blades, leaving only the midrib. They are active at night, and nymphs are more destructive than adults. They are common in irrigated rice environments and are found under weed piles in upland areas. The presence of weed piles and alternate hosts supports their continuous presence.
