= Hapithus melodius =

Scientific classification
- Kingdom: Animalia
- Phylum: Arthropoda
- Class: Insecta
- Order: Orthoptera
- Suborder: Ensifera
- Family: Oecanthidae
- Genus: Hapithus
- Species: H. melodius

Binomial name
- Hapithus melodius T. J. Walker, 1977

Species of cricket

Hapithus melodius, the musical bush cricket, is a species of bush cricket in the family Gryllidae. It is found in North America,.
