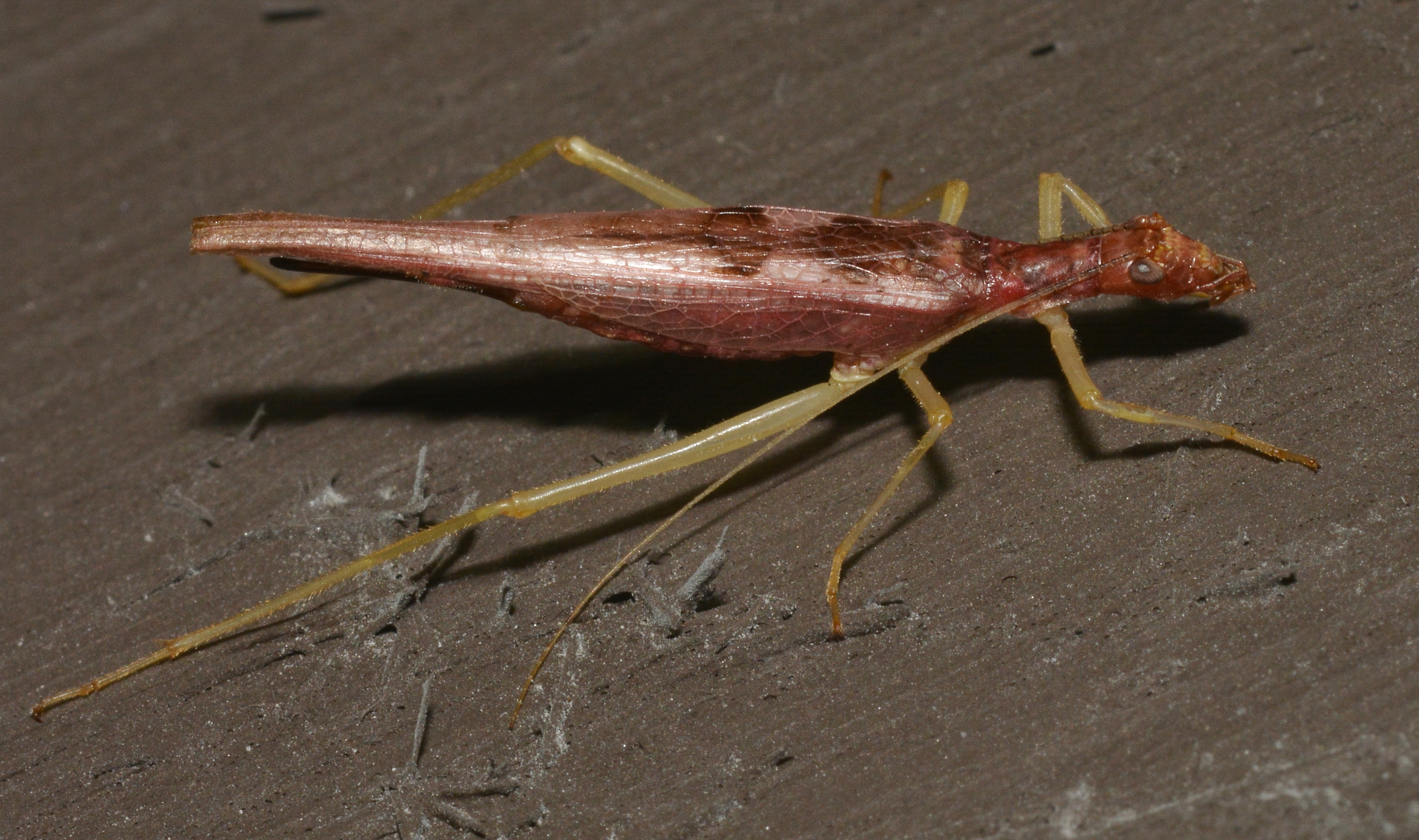

Scientific classification
- Kingdom: Animalia
- Phylum: Arthropoda
- Class: Insecta
- Order: Orthoptera
- Suborder: Ensifera
- Family: Oecanthidae
- Genus: Neoxabea
- Species: N. bipunctata

Binomial name
- Neoxabea bipunctata (De Geer, 1773)

= Neoxabea bipunctata =

Species of cricket

Neoxabea bipunctata, the two-spotted tree cricket, is a species of tree cricket in the family Oecanthidae. It is found in North America.
