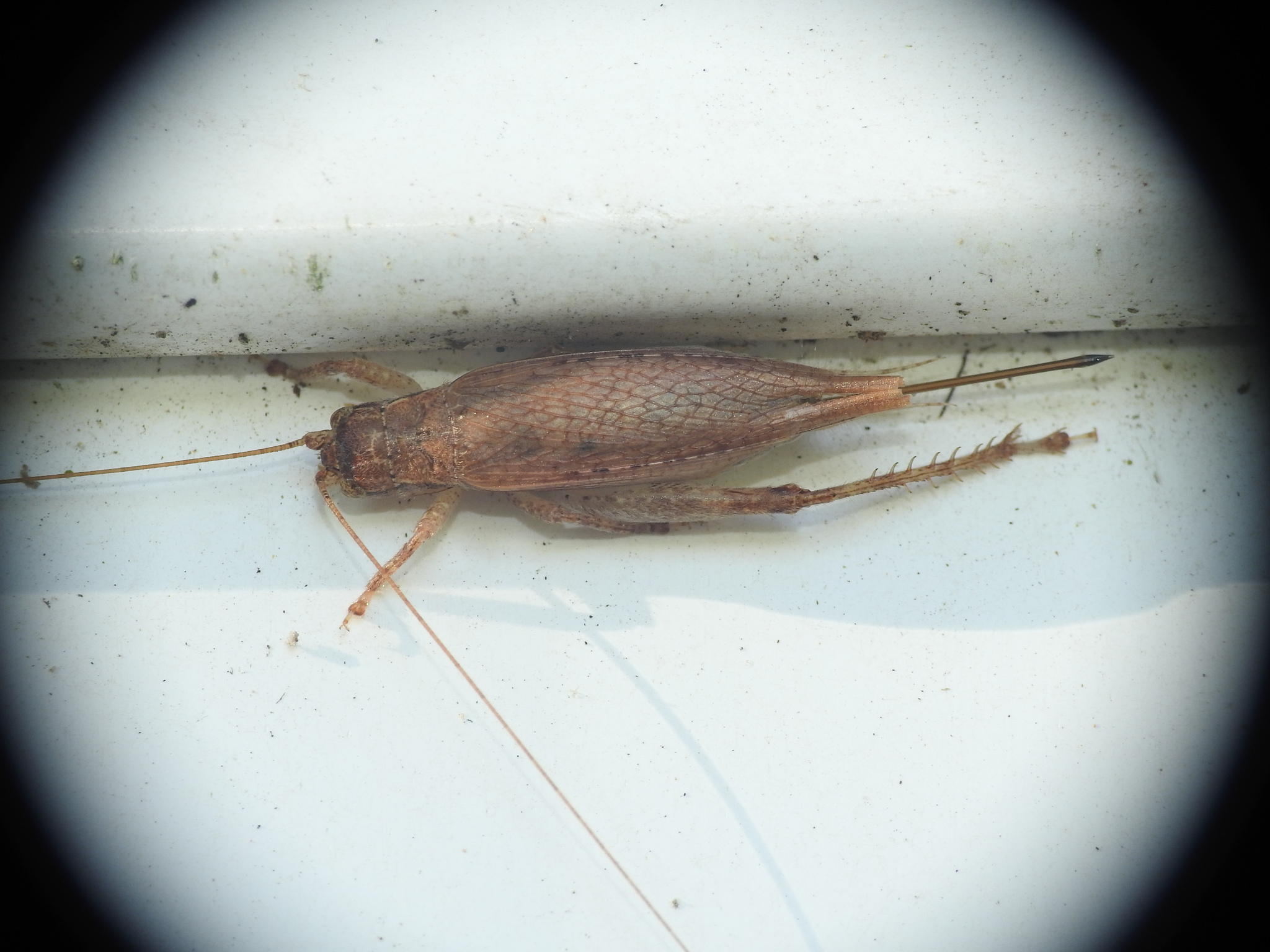

Scientific classification
- Domain: Eukaryota
- Kingdom: Animalia
- Phylum: Arthropoda
- Class: Insecta
- Order: Orthoptera
- Suborder: Ensifera
- Family: Oecanthidae
- Genus: Hapithus
- Species: H. luteolira

Binomial name
- Hapithus luteolira T. J. Walker, 1969

= Hapithus luteolira =

Species of cricket

Hapithus luteolira, the false jumping bush cricket, is a species of bush cricket in the family Gryllidae. It is found in North America.

This species was formerly a member of the genus Orocharis, which recently became a subgenus of Hapithus.
