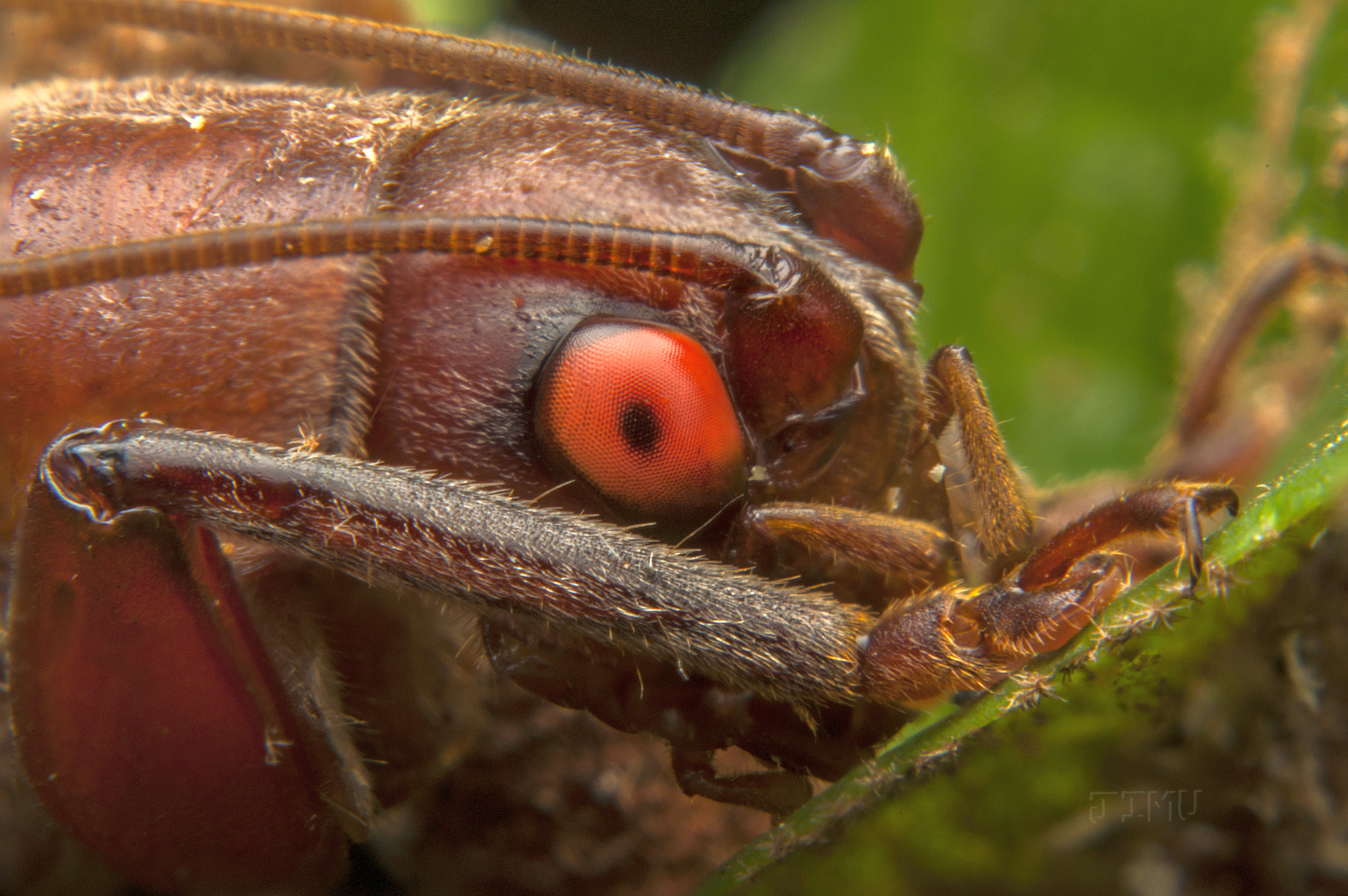

Scientific classification
- Kingdom: Animalia
- Phylum: Arthropoda
- Class: Insecta
- Order: Orthoptera
- Suborder: Ensifera
- Family: Oecanthidae
- Subfamily: Tafaliscinae
- Tribe: Tafaliscini
- Genus: Tafalisca; Walker, 1869

Synonyms
- Metrypa Brunner von Wattenwyl, 1873; Metrypus [sic] Saussure, 1878; Pseudogryllus Chopard, 1912

= Tafalisca =

Genus of crickets

External image
- Images at iNaturalist

Tafalisca is a genus of silent bush crickets in the family Oecanthidae. Records for described species in Tafalisca are mostly from Central and South America, with one species from Java.

== Species ==
These species belong to the genus Tafalisca:

- Tafalisca bahama Otte & Perez-Gelabert, 2009
- Tafalisca bahiensis (Saussure, 1878)
- Tafalisca bogotensis (Saussure, 1878)
- Tafalisca brasiliana (Saussure, 1878)
- Tafalisca claudicans (Brunner von Wattenwyl, 1893)
- Tafalisca crypsiphonus (Saussure, 1878)
- Tafalisca ecuador Gorochov, 2011
- Tafalisca eleuthera Otte & Perez-Gelabert, 2009
- Tafalisca evimon Otte & Perez-Gelabert, 2009
- Tafalisca furfurosa Otte, 2006
- Tafalisca gnophos Otte & Perez-Gelabert, 2009
- Tafalisca heros (Brunner von Wattenwyl, 1893)
- Tafalisca huanchaca Gorochov, 2017
- Tafalisca lineatipes Bruner, 1916
- Tafalisca lurida F. Walker, 1869 (silent bush cricket) - type species
- Tafalisca maroniensis Chopard, 1930
- Tafalisca mexico Gorochov, 2011
- Tafalisca muta (Saussure, 1878)
- Tafalisca pallidocincta (Kirby, 1890)
- Tafalisca periplanes Otte & Perez-Gelabert, 2009
- Tafalisca porteri Chopard, 1930
- Tafalisca proxima Gorochov, 2011
- Tafalisca rico Otte & Perez-Gelabert, 2009
- Tafalisca virescens (Saussure, 1878) - Java
