= Aphonomorphini =

Scientific classification
- Domain: Eukaryota
- Kingdom: Animalia
- Phylum: Arthropoda
- Class: Insecta
- Order: Orthoptera
- Suborder: Ensifera
- Family: Oecanthidae
- Supertribe: Hapithidi
- Tribe: Aphonomorphini; Desutter-Grandcolas, 1988

Synonyms
- Aphonomorphina Desutter-Grandcolas, 1988

Tribe of bush crickets

Aphonomorphini is a tribe of crickets in the supertribe Hapithidi. There are more than 90 described species in Aphonomorphini, all found in South America.

== Genera ==
These genera belong to the tribe Aphonomorphini:

1. Aenigmaphonus Gorochov, 2010
2. Aphonomorphus Rehn, 1903
3. Eneopteroides Chopard, 1956
4. Paraphonus Hebard, 1928
5. Podoscirtodes Chopard, 1956
6. Spiraphonus Gorochov, 2010
