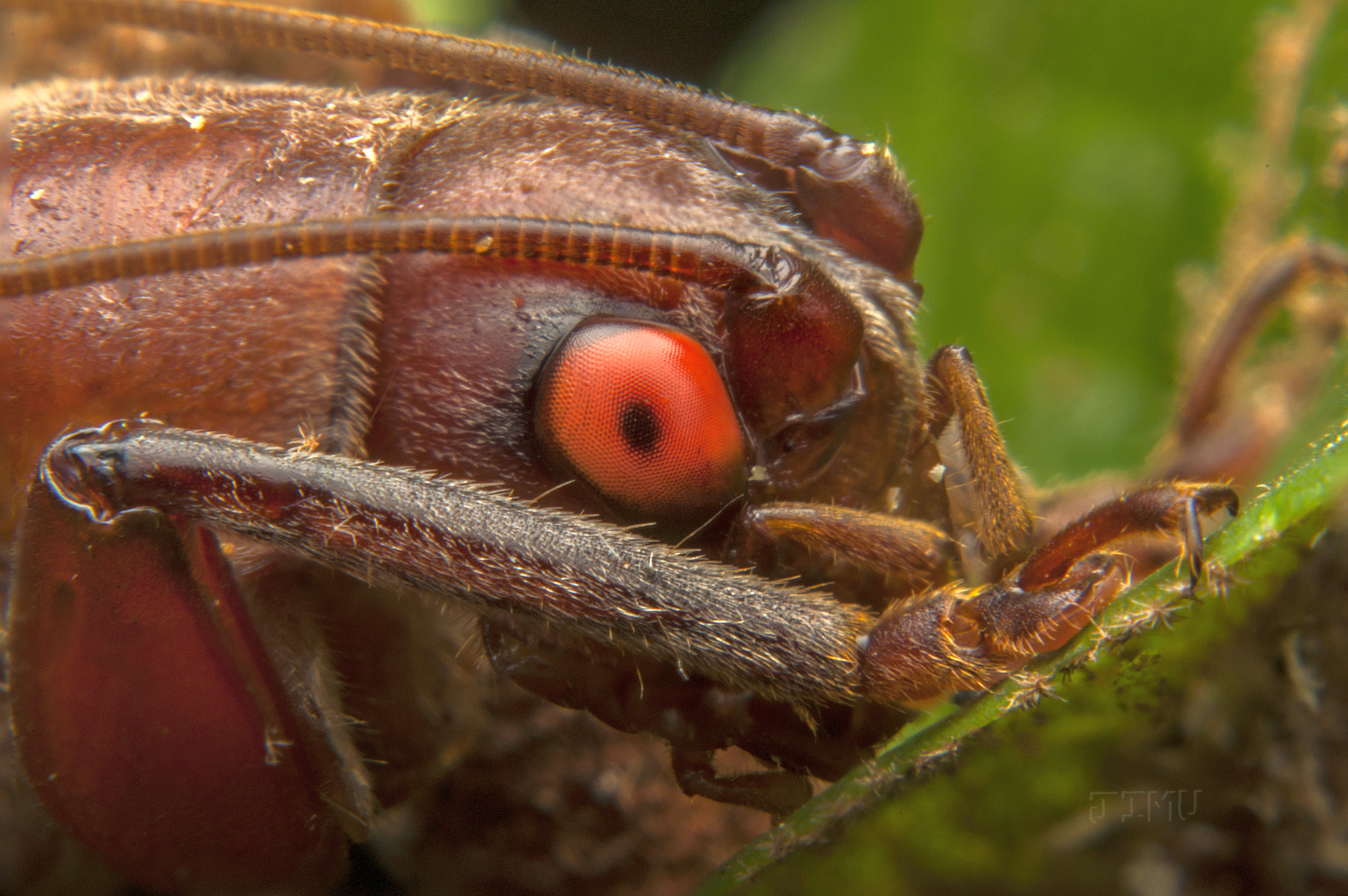
- Tafalisca lurida

Scientific classification
- Kingdom: Animalia
- Phylum: Arthropoda
- Clade: Pancrustacea
- Class: Insecta
- Order: Orthoptera
- Suborder: Ensifera
- Superfamily: Grylloidea
- Family: Oecanthidae
- Subfamily: Tafaliscinae; Desutter-Grandcolas, 1988

Tribes (in 2 supertribes)
- Neometrypini; Paroecanthini; Tafaliscini

= Tafaliscinae =

Subfamily of crickets

External image
- Images at iNaturalist

The Tafaliscinae are a subfamily of mostly Neotropical crickets in the recently restored family Oecanthidae and based on the type genus Tafalisca Walker, 1869. They can be found in warmer parts of the Americas (south of approximately 30° N) and there is a species record from Java.

== Tribes and genera ==
The Tafaliscinae currently (2024) consist of three tribes (in two supertribes):

supertribe Paroecanthidi Gorochov, 1986

=== Neometrypini ===
Auth.: Desutter-Grandcolas, 1988

1. Apterotrypa Gorochov, 2017
2. Brazitrypa Gorochov, 2011
3. Cylindrogryllus Saussure, 1878
4. Dicerorostrum – monotypic D. diceros Gorochov, 2017
5. Neometrypus Desutter-Grandcolas, 1988
6. Nessa Walker, 1869

=== Paroecanthini ===
Auth.: Gorochov, 1986

1. Adenophallusia de Mello & de Camargo e Mello, 1996
2. Angustitrella Gorochov, 2011
3. Bofana Otte & Perez-Gelabert, 2009
4. Ectotrypa Saussure, 1874
5. Paroecanthus Saussure, 1859
6. Prodiatrypa Desutter-Grandcolas, 1988
7. Selvagryllus Otte, 2006
8. Siccotrella Gorochov, 2011

supertribe Tafaliscidi Desutter-Grandcolas, 1988

=== Tafaliscini ===
Auth.: Desutter-Grandcolas, 1988

1. Amblyrhethus Kirby, 1906
2. Eubezverkhovia Gorochov & Izerskyy, 2020
3. Mexitrypa Gorochov, 2011
4. Perutrella Gorochov, 2011
5. Stenaphonus Saussure, 1878
6. Tafalisca Walker, 1869
7. Veredatrypa Campos, 2020
