= Cearacesaini =

Scientific classification
- Kingdom: Animalia
- Phylum: Arthropoda
- Class: Insecta
- Order: Orthoptera
- Suborder: Ensifera
- Family: Oecanthidae
- Supertribe: Hapithidi
- Tribe: Cearacesaini; Koçak & Kemal, 2010

Tribe of crickets

Cearacesaini is a tribe of crickets in the subfamily Hapithinae: found in North, Central, and South America. There are at least 4 genera and about 16 described species in Cearacesaini.

== Genera ==
These four genera belong to the tribe Cearacesaini:

- Barota Gorochov, 2017
- Cearacesa Koçak & Kemal, 2010
- Najtaecesa Desutter-Grandcolas, 2017
- Taroba de Mello & Souza-Dias, 2010
