= Beybienkoana =

Scientific classification
- Domain: Eukaryota
- Kingdom: Animalia
- Phylum: Arthropoda
- Class: Insecta
- Order: Orthoptera
- Suborder: Ensifera
- Superfamily: Grylloidea
- Family: Oecanthidae
- Subfamily: Euscyrtinae
- Genus: Beybienkoana; Gorochov, 1988

Genus of crickets

External image
- Images at iNaturalist

Beybienkoana is a genus of crickets in the subfamily Euscyrtinae. Species can be found mostly in Africa, Asia and Australia.

== Species ==
Beybienkoana includes the following species:

- Beybienkoana africana Chopard, 1962
- Beybienkoana australica Chopard, 1925
- Beybienkoana bakboensis Gorochov, 1988 - type species
- Beybienkoana ditrapeza Liu & Shi, 2012
- Beybienkoana formosana Shiraki, 1930
- Beybienkoana gregaria Yang & Yang, 2012
- Beybienkoana karnyi Shiraki, 1930
- Beybienkoana longecaudata Chopard, 1925
- Beybienkoana longipennis Liu & Yin, 1993
- Beybienkoana luteola Yang & Yang, 2012
- Beybienkoana majora Liu & Shi, 2012
- Beybienkoana parvula Shi & Liu, 2007
- Beybienkoana splendida Yang & Yang, 2012
- Beybienkoana tenuis Bey-Bienko, 1966
- Beybienkoana trapeza Liu & Shi, 2012
