= Euscyrtodes =

Scientific classification
- Domain: Eukaryota
- Kingdom: Animalia
- Phylum: Arthropoda
- Class: Insecta
- Order: Orthoptera
- Suborder: Ensifera
- Superfamily: Grylloidea
- Family: Oecanthidae
- Subfamily: Euscyrtinae
- Genus: Euscyrtodes; Gorochov, 1987

Genus of crickets

Euscyrtodes is a genus of crickets in the subfamily Euscyrtinae. Species can be found in Asia, with records from Taiwan, Vietnam and Java.

== Species ==
Euscyrtodes includes the following species:

- Euscyrtodes crassiceps Saussure, 1878
- Euscyrtodes ogatai Shiraki, 1930
- Euscyrtodes orientalis Gorochov, 1987 - type species (locality: Cuc Phuong, Vietnam)
- Euscyrtodes pliginskii Gorochov, 1987
- Euscyrtodes vietnamensis Gorochov, 1988
