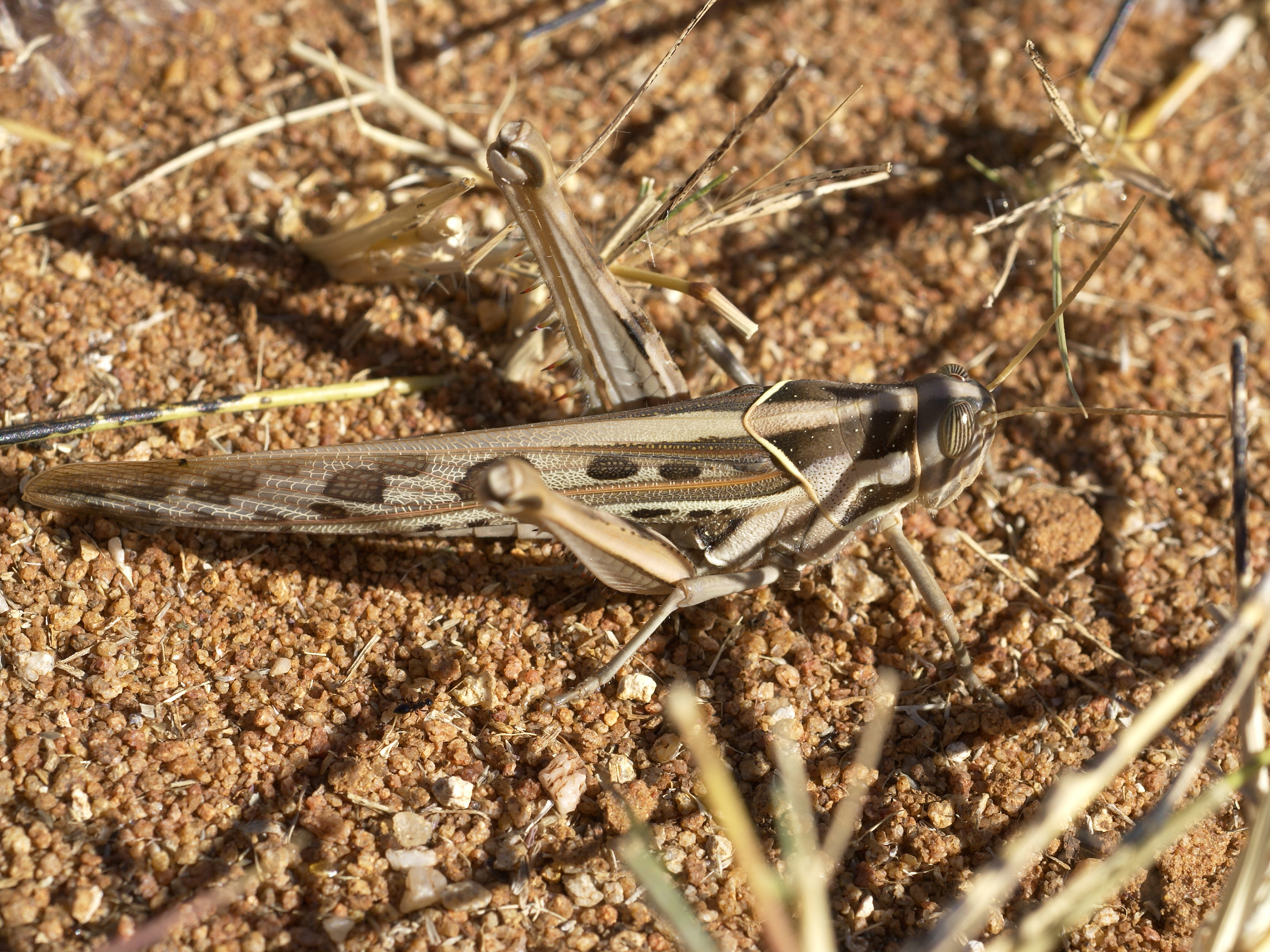
- Cyrtacanthacris tatarica, Namibia

Scientific classification
- Kingdom: Animalia
- Phylum: Arthropoda
- Clade: Pancrustacea
- Class: Insecta
- Order: Orthoptera
- Suborder: Caelifera
- Family: Acrididae
- Subfamily: Cyrtacanthacridinae
- Tribe: Cyrtacanthacridini
- Genus: Cyrtacanthacris
- Species: C. tatarica

Binomial name
- Cyrtacanthacris tatarica (Linnaeus, 1758)

= Cyrtacanthacris tatarica =

Species of grasshopper

Cyrtacanthacris tatarica, the brown-spotted locust, is a species of bird grasshopper in the family Acrididae. It is found in the Afrotropics and Indomalaya.

== Subspecies ==
These subspecies belong to the species Cyrtacanthacris tatarica:

- Cyrtacanthacris tatarica abyssinica Uvarov, 1941
- Cyrtacanthacris tatarica tatarica (Linnaeus, 1758)
