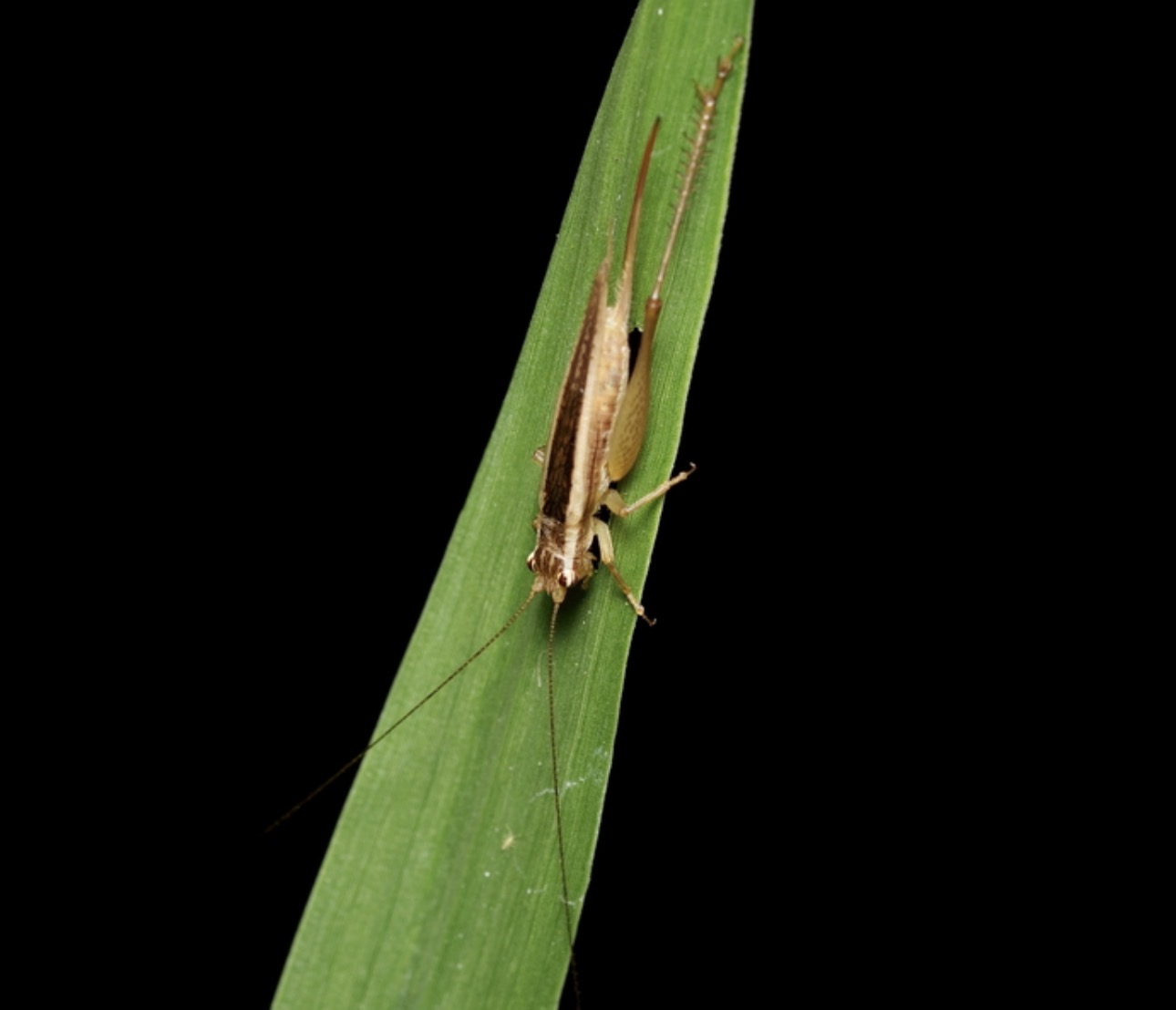
- Euscyrtus concinnus in Singapore

Scientific classification
- Kingdom: Animalia
- Phylum: Arthropoda
- Class: Insecta
- Order: Orthoptera
- Suborder: Ensifera
- Superfamily: Grylloidea
- Family: Oecanthidae
- Subfamily: Euscyrtinae
- Genus: Euscyrtus; Guérin-Méneville, 1844

Synonyms
- Euscirtus Brunner von Wattenwyl, 1873

= Euscyrtus =

Genus of crickets

External image
- Images at iNaturalist

Euscyrtus is a genus of crickets in the subfamily Euscyrtinae. Species can be found mostly (with the exception of E. mexicanus) in Africa, Asia and Australia.

== Species ==
Euscyrtus includes the following species:

subgenus Euscyrtus Guérin-Méneville, 1844

1. Euscyrtus angustifrons Chopard, 1969
2. Euscyrtus bipunctatus Chopard, 1958
3. Euscyrtus bivittatus Guérin-Méneville, 1844 - type species (E. bivittatus bivittatus)
4. Euscyrtus bolivari Chopard, 1969
5. Euscyrtus fuscus Ingrisch, 1987
6. Euscyrtus intermedius Ingrisch, 1987
7. Euscyrtus laminifer Chopard, 1936
8. Euscyrtus lineoculus Ingrisch, 1987
9. Euscyrtus madagascarensis Gorochov, 1988
10. Euscyrtus major Chopard, 1925
11. Euscyrtus mexicanus Saussure, 1874
12. Euscyrtus necydaloides Walker, 1869
13. Euscyrtus nigrifrons Chopard, 1945
14. Euscyrtus pallens Karny, 1907
15. Euscyrtus pallidus Stål, 1877
16. Euscyrtus planiceps Karsch, 1893
17. Euscyrtus quadripunctatus Ingrisch, 1987
18. Euscyrtus sigmoidalis Saussure, 1878
19. Euscyrtus tubus Meena, Swaminathan & Swaminathan, 2020

subgenus Osus Gorochov, 1987

1. Euscyrtus concinnus Haan, 1842
2. Euscyrtus hemelytrus Haan, 1842
3. Euscyrtus japonicus Shiraki, 1930
