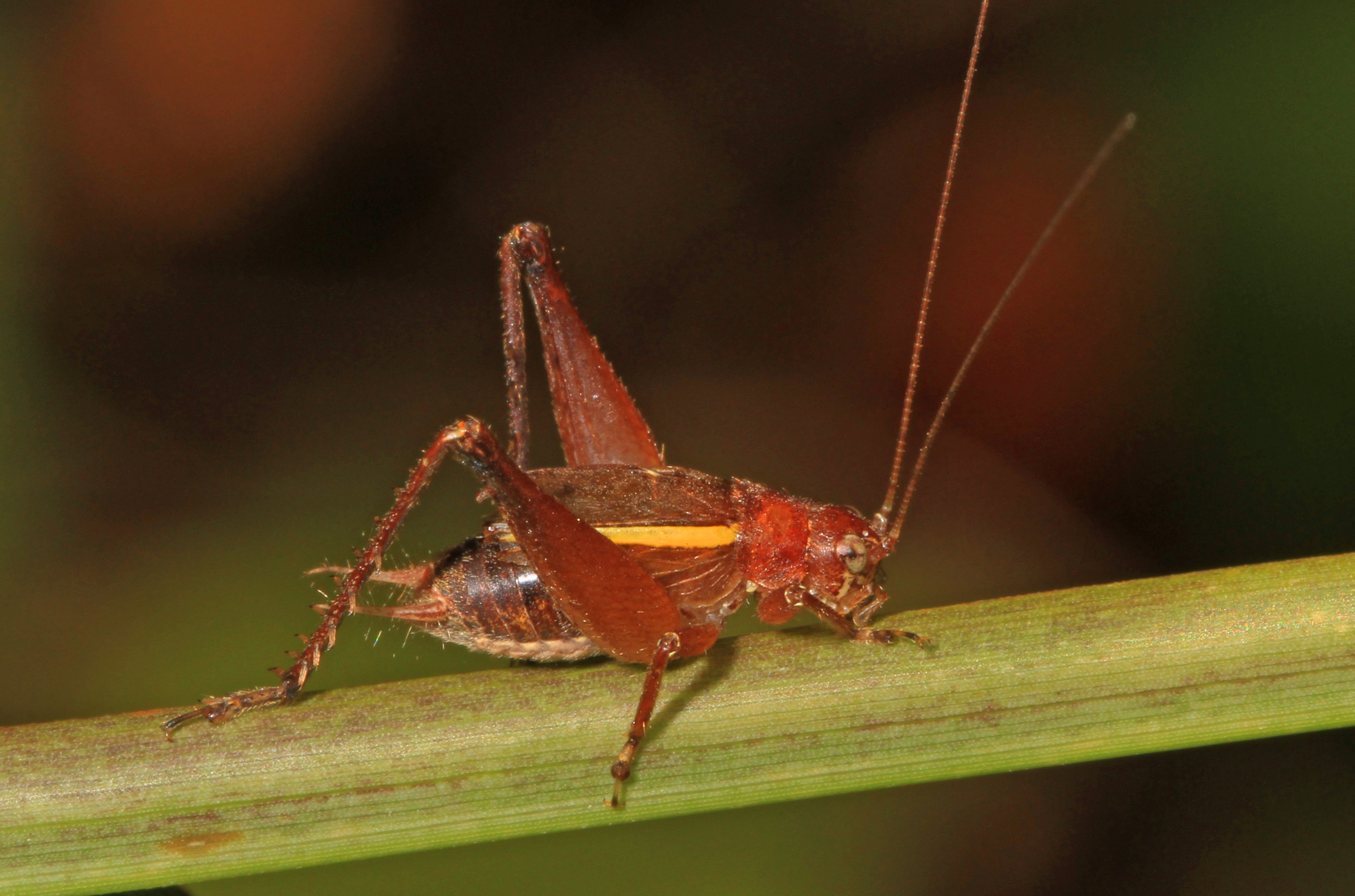
- Hapithus agitator

Scientific classification
- Domain: Eukaryota
- Kingdom: Animalia
- Phylum: Arthropoda
- Class: Insecta
- Order: Orthoptera
- Suborder: Ensifera
- Family: Oecanthidae
- Subfamily: Podoscirtinae
- Supertribe: Hapithidi; Gorochov, 1986

Tribes
- Aphonomorphini; Cearacesaini; Hapithini; Phyllogryllini

= Hapithidi =

Subfamily of crickets

The Hapithidi, previously placed as subfamily Hapithinae, is a supertribe of crickets in the family Oecanthidae and subfamily Podoscirtinae. It is one of several groups referred to in American English as "bush crickets" (along with Eneopterinae and Trigonidiinae), although this term can be confused with the Tettigoniidae.

== Taxonomy ==
The Orthoptera Species File lists four tribes:

Tribe Aphonomorphini

Auth.: Desutter-Grandcolas, 1988 (Central & S. America)

- type genus Aenigmaphonus Gorochov, 2010

=== Cearacesaini ===
Auth.: Koçak & Kemal, 2010 (South America)

1. Barota Gorochov, 2017^{c g}
2. Cearacesa Koçak & Kemal, 2010^{c g}
3. Najtaecesa Desutter-Grandcolas, 2017^{i c g b} (flightless bush crickets)
4. Taroba de Mello & Souza-Dias, 2010^{c g}

=== Hapithini ===
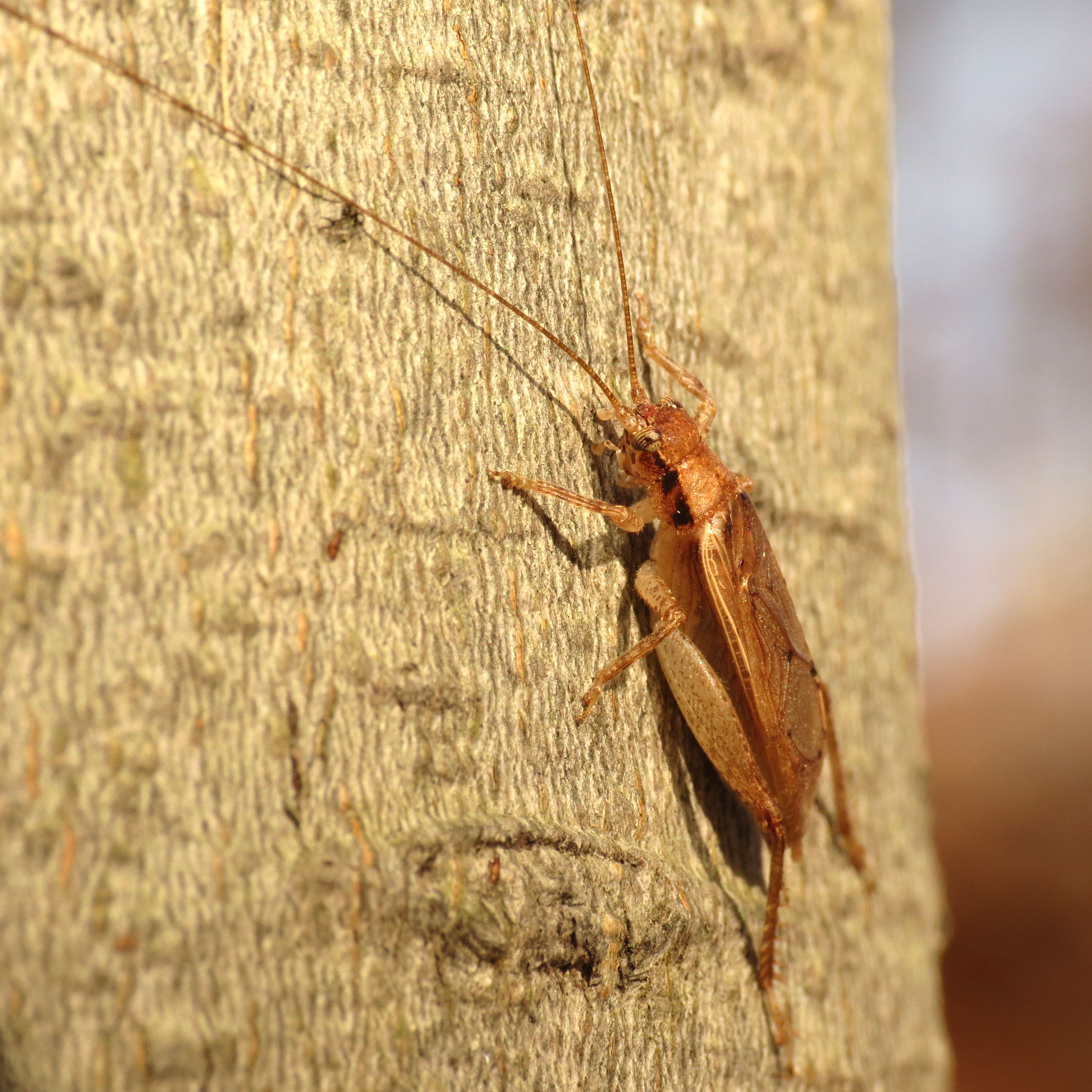
Orocharis saltator

Auth.: Gorochov, 1986 (Central & S. America)

subtribe Hapithina Gorochov, 1986

- Hapithus Uhler, 1864 - Flightless Bush Crickets
  - subgenus Antillicharis Otte & Perez-Gelabert, 2009
  - subgenus Curiocharis Gorochov, 2017
  - subgenus Hapithus Uhler, 1864
  - subgenus Laurepa Walker, 1869
  - subgenus Mashiyana Otte & Perez-Gelabert, 2009
  - subgenus Orocharis Uhler, 1864
- Jabulania Otte & Perez-Gelabert, 2009
- Stenogryllus Gorochov, 2017^{c g}

other genera

1. Carylla Gorochov, 2002^{c g}
2. Hapithoides - monotypic H. insolitum Hebard, 1928^{c g} (S. America)
3. Knyella de Mello & Souza-Dias, 2010^{c g}
4. Laurellia Otte & Perez-Gelabert, 2009^{c g}
5. Margarettia Gorochov, 2017^{c g}
6. Sabelo Otte & Perez-Gelabert, 2009^{c g}
7. Sipho Saussure, 1878^{c g}
8. Tomwalkerella Otte & Perez-Gelabert, 2024 - Note not Walkerana Otte & Perez-Gelabert, 2009 (Walkerana Dahanukar et al. 2016 is a frog genus).

=== Phyllogryllini ===
Auth.: Campos, 2022 (Central & S. America)

1. Gryllophyllus Gorochov, 2017^{c g}
2. Phyllogryllus Saussure, 1878
3. Somnambula (cricket) Gorochov, 2017

Data sources: i = ITIS, c = Catalogue of Life, g = GBIF, b = Bugguide.net
