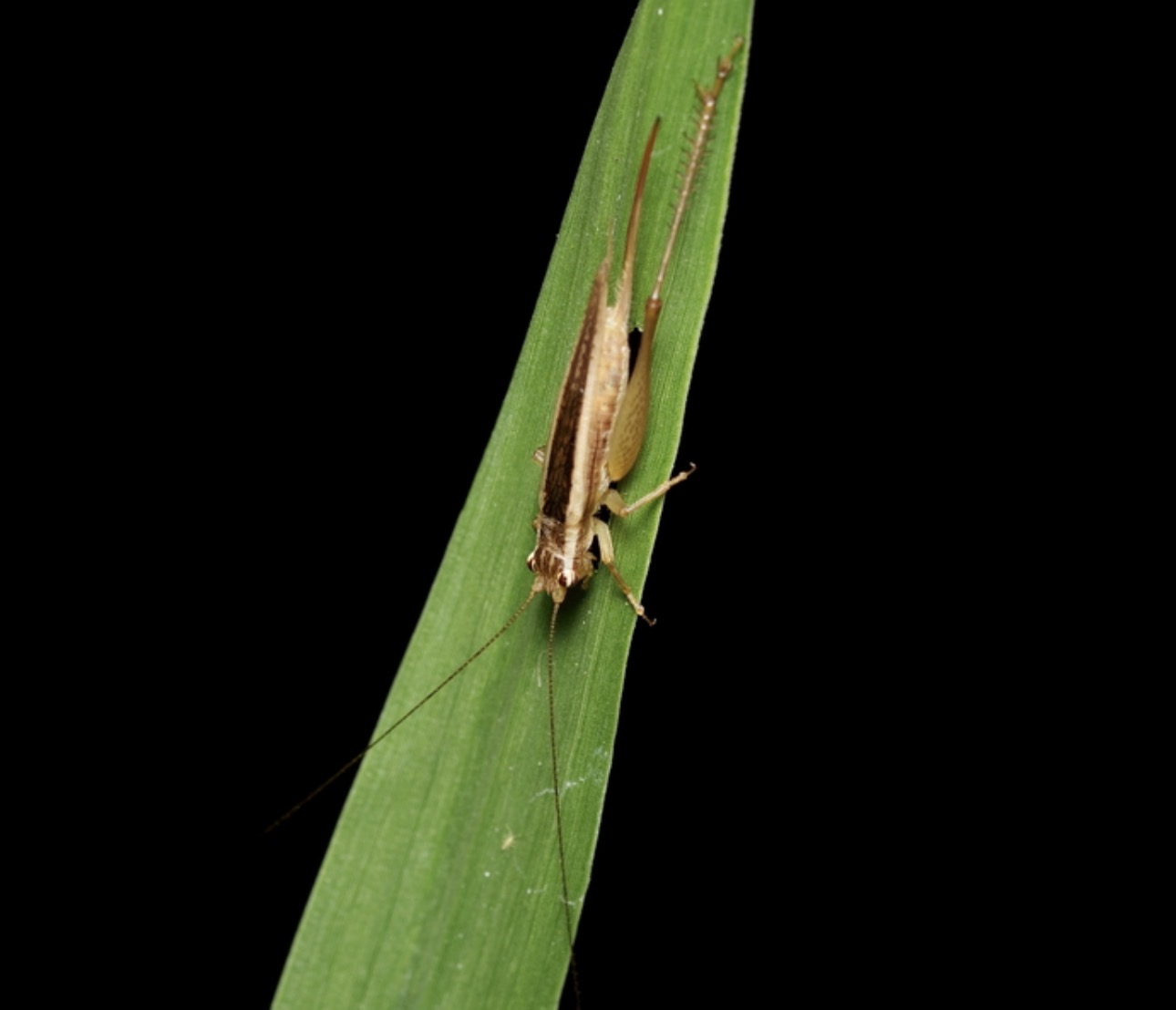
- Euscyrtus concinnus

Scientific classification
- Kingdom: Animalia
- Phylum: Arthropoda
- Clade: Pancrustacea
- Class: Insecta
- Order: Orthoptera
- Suborder: Ensifera
- Infraorder: Gryllidea
- Superfamily: Grylloidea
- Family: Oecanthidae
- Subfamily: Euscyrtinae; Gorochov, 1985

= Euscyrtinae =

Subfamily of crickets

This female field cricket was seen in Ohio in September.

External image
- Images at iNaturalist

The Euscyrtinae are a subfamily of crickets, in the family Oecanthidae, based on the type genus Euscyrtus. They are terrestrial and omnivorous and can be found in: Central America, Africa, Asia and Australia.

== Genera ==
The Orthoptera Species File lists:

1. Beybienkoana Gorochov, 1988
2. Burrianus – monotypic – B. pachyceros Chopard, 1962
3. Euscyrtodes Gorochov, 1987
4. Euscyrtus Guérin-Méneville, 1844
5. Merrinella Otte & Alexander, 1983
6. Patiscodes Gorochov, 1988
7. Patiscus Stål, 1877
8. Proturana Otte, 1987 – monotypic – P. subapterus (Chopard, 1970)
9. Tozeria – monotypic – T. muwitiwallina Otte & Alexander, 1983
10. Turana Otte & Alexander, 1983
