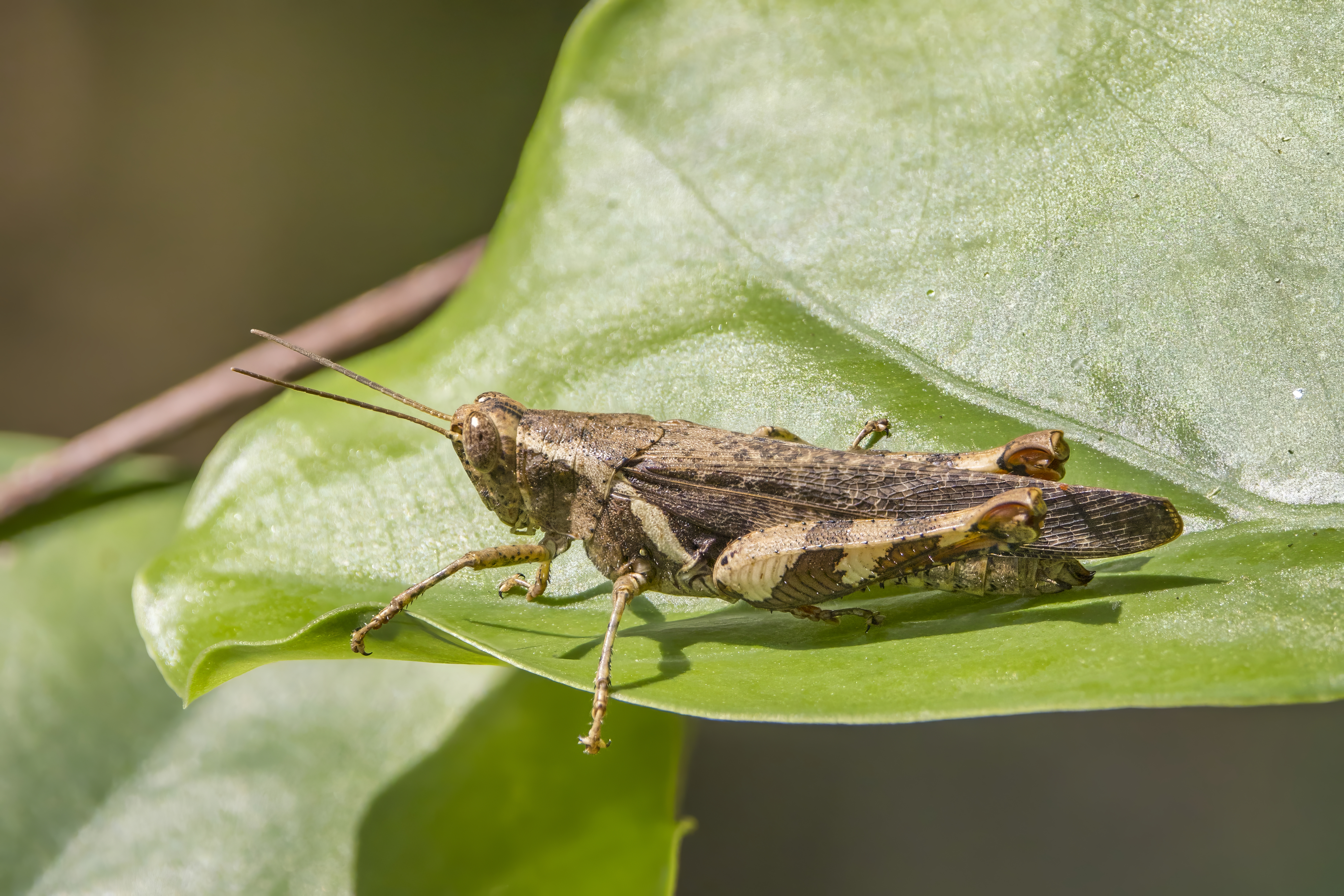
- in Laos

Scientific classification
- Kingdom: Animalia
- Phylum: Arthropoda
- Clade: Pancrustacea
- Class: Insecta
- Order: Orthoptera
- Suborder: Caelifera
- Family: Acrididae
- Subfamily: Catantopinae
- Tribe: Catantopini
- Genus: Xenocatantops
- Species: X. humilis

Binomial name
- Xenocatantops humilis (Serville, 1838)

Synonyms
- Caloptenus dominans (Walker, 1870); Caloptenus strictus (Walker, 1870); Catantops speciosus (Brancsik, 1896); Catantops humilis Willemse, C., 1957; Catantops humilis Kirby, 1910; Cyrtacanthacris punctipennis Walker, F., 1871; Xenocatantops dominans (Walker, F., 1870); Xenocatantops strictus (Walker, F., 1870)

= Xenocatantops humilis =

Species of grasshopper

Xenocatantops humilis is the type species of grasshoppers in its genus, belonging to the family Acrididae and subfamily Catantopinae.

== Subspecies ==
The Catalogue of Life lists:

- X. humilis humilis
- X. humilis brachycerus

== Distribution ==
X. humilis in Singapore. Video clip

This species can be found in India, Indo-China, Malaysia (the type locality is Java), and Papua New Guinea.

== Description ==
The head of Xenocatantops humilis shows a straight frons in the profile and filiform antennae. Hind femora are rather slender, with wide black spots on the back. In the males cerci are quite short, without clear apical bifurcation, bilaterally compressed and apically incurved.

== Biology ==
Xenocatantops humilis must go through about five stages before becoming a winged adult.

== Bibliography ==
- Woo, H .P. M., M.K. Tan, 2011. Grasshoppers. Pp. 331–332. In: Ng, P. K. L., R. T. Corlett & *H. T. W. Tan (editors). Singapore Biodiversity. An Encyclopedia of the Natural Environment and Sustainable Development. Editions Didier Millet, Singapore. 552 pp.
- Tan, M. K., R. W. J. Ngiam & M. R. B. Ismail, 2012. A checklist of Orthoptera in Singapore parks. Nature in Singapore, 5: 61–67.
- Ari Sugiarto - Comparison of Jumping Distance on Several Grasshopper Species (Orthoptera)
