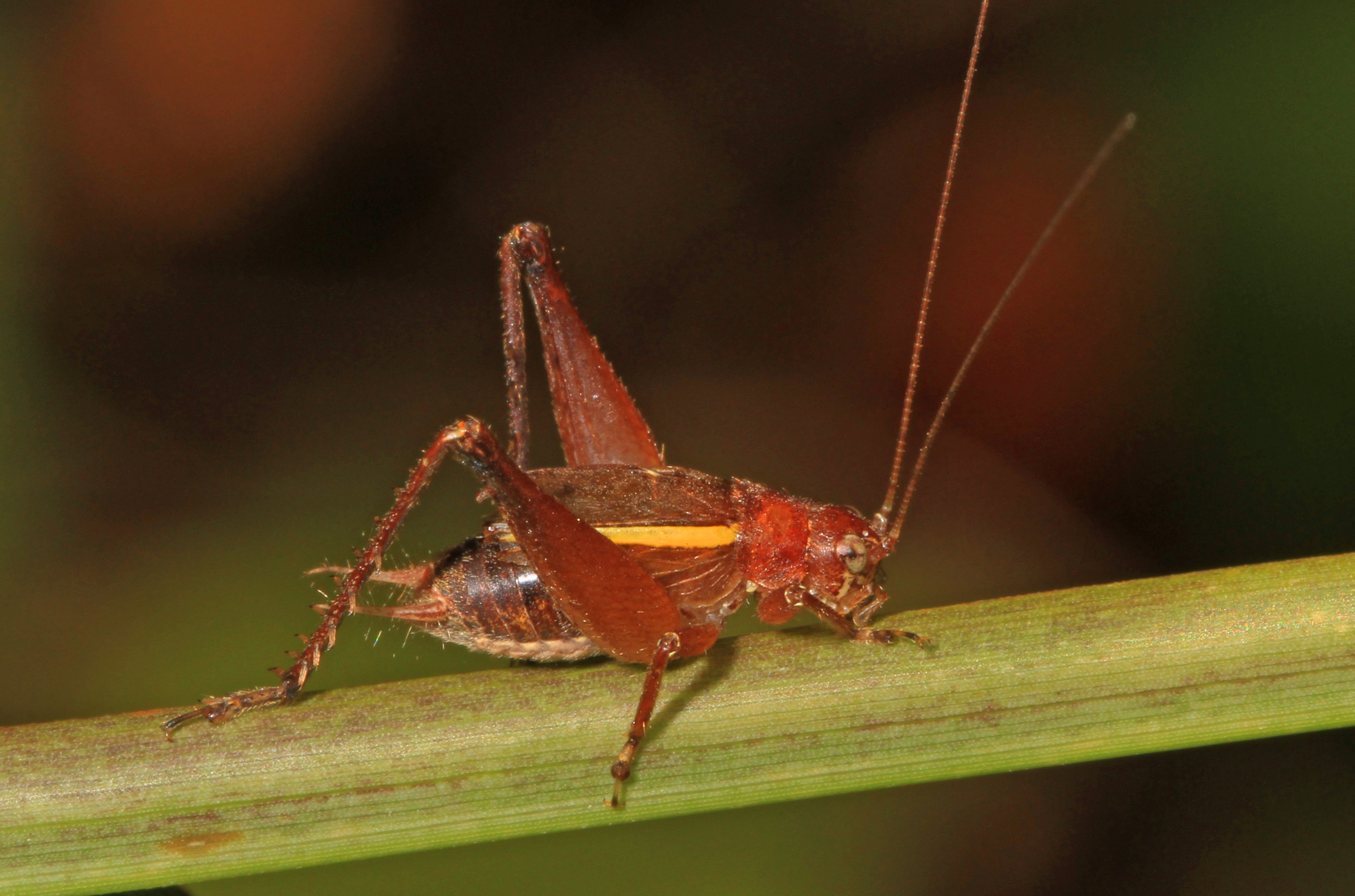
- Hapithus agitator, Virginia

Scientific classification
- Domain: Eukaryota
- Kingdom: Animalia
- Phylum: Arthropoda
- Class: Insecta
- Order: Orthoptera
- Suborder: Ensifera
- Family: Oecanthidae
- Supertribe: Hapithidi
- Tribe: Hapithini; Gorochov, 1986

Synonyms
- Stenogryllinae Chopard, 1912

= Hapithini =

Tribe of crickets

Hapithini is a tribe of crickets in the subfamily Hapithinae. Described species have been found in Central and South America.

== Genera ==
These genera belong to the tribe Hapithini:

1. Carylla Otte & Perez-Gelabert, 2009
2. Hapithus Uhler, 1864 (flightless bush crickets)
3. Jabulania Otte & Perez-Gelabert, 2009
4. Knyella Otte & Perez-Gelabert, 2009
5. Laurellia Otte & Perez-Gelabert, 2009
6. Margarettia Otte & Perez-Gelabert, 2009
7. Phyllogryllus Saussure, 1878
8. Sabelo Otte & Perez-Gelabert, 2009
9. Sipho Otte & Perez-Gelabert, 2009
10. Stenogryllus Saussure, 1878
11. Tomwalkerella Otte & Perez-Gelabert, 2024 - Note not Walkerana Otte & Perez-Gelabert, 2009
