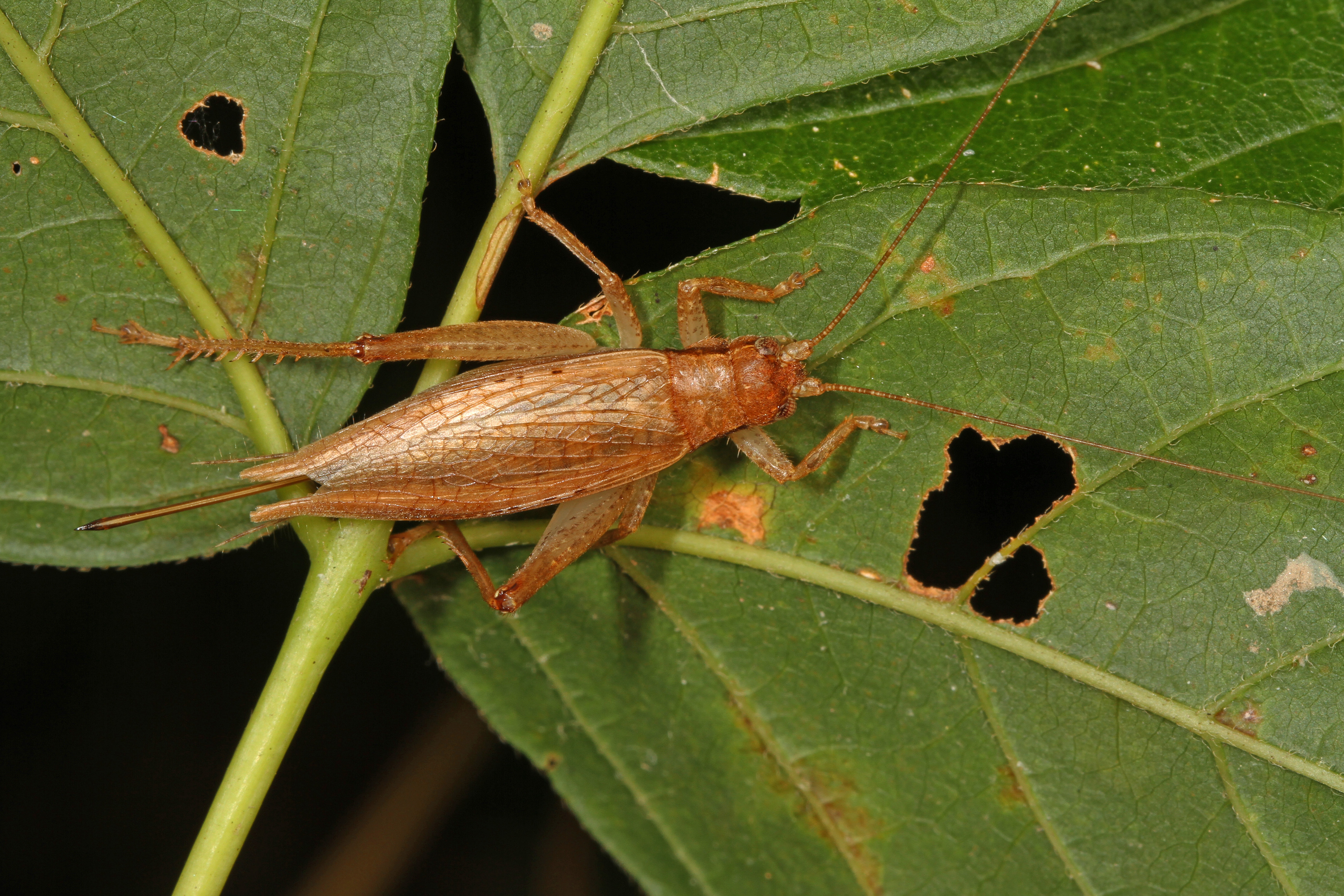
- Hapithus saltator, Maryland

Scientific classification
- Domain: Eukaryota
- Kingdom: Animalia
- Phylum: Arthropoda
- Class: Insecta
- Order: Orthoptera
- Suborder: Ensifera
- Family: Oecanthidae
- Tribe: Hapithini
- Genus: Hapithus; Uhler, 1864

Subgenera
- Antillicharis Otte & Perez-Gelabert, 2009; Curiocharis Gorochov, 2017; Hapithus Uhler, 1864; Laurepa Walker, 1869; Mashiyana Otte & Perez-Gelabert, 2009; Orocharis Uhler, 1864

= Hapithus =

Genus of crickets

Hapithus is a genus of flightless bush crickets in the family Oecanthidae and typical of the tribe Hapithini, from the Americas. There are more than 200 described species in Hapithus.

The genus Orocharis was recently determined to be a taxonomic synonym of Hapithus, and is now considered a subgenus of the genus Hapithus.

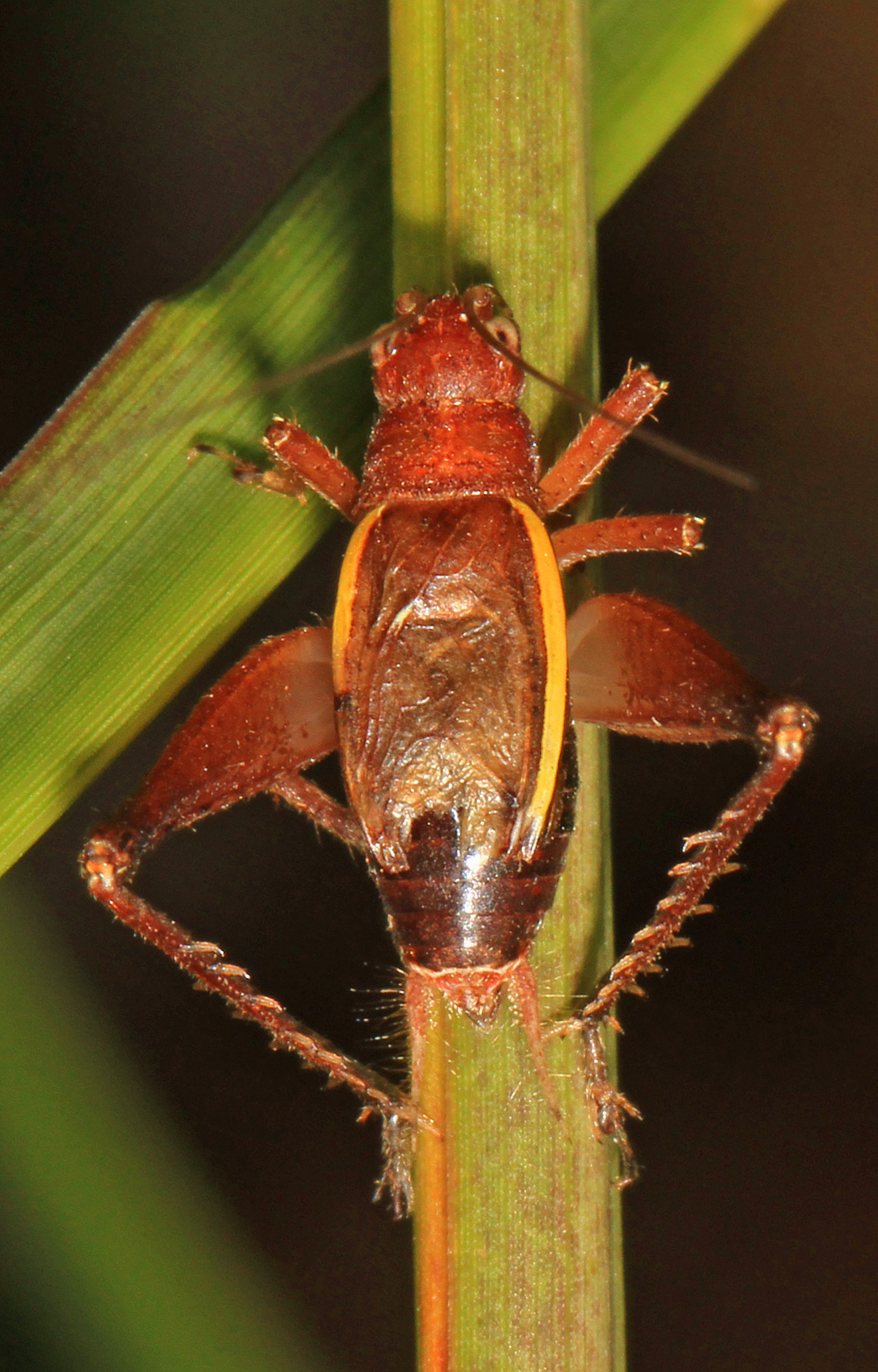
Hapithus agitator

== See also ==
- List of Hapithus species
