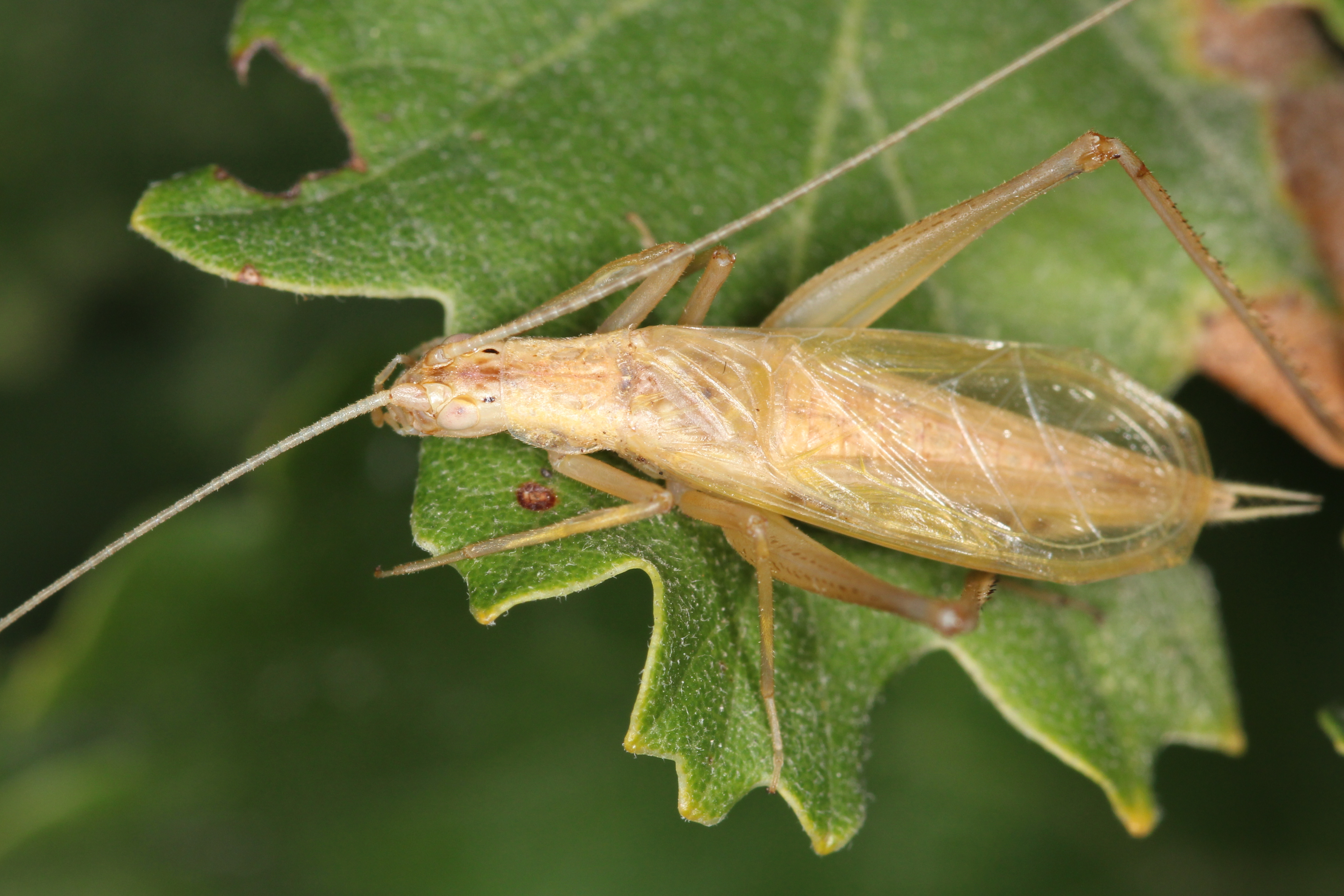
- Oecanthus pellucens (male)

Scientific classification
- Domain: Eukaryota
- Kingdom: Animalia
- Phylum: Arthropoda
- Class: Insecta
- Order: Orthoptera
- Suborder: Ensifera
- Infraorder: Gryllidea
- Superfamily: Grylloidea
- Family: Oecanthidae; Blanchard, 1845

Synonyms
- Oecanthites Blanchard, 1845

= Oecanthidae =

Family of crickets

The Oecanthidae are a recently (2022) restored family of crickets based on the type genus Oecanthus Serville, 1831. They include "tree crickets", "anomalous crickets" and "bush crickets" (American usage) and can be found in warmer parts of most of the world (not the northern Palaearctic, Nearctic or Antarctica).

== Origin and circumscription ==
The family and lower taxonomic names are based on "Oecanthites" used by Émile Blanchard in 1845, with the first use as Oecanthidae by Carl Brunner von Wattenwyl in 1873. Campos et al. (2022) provide a key to the four subfamilies and tribes.

=== subfamily Euscyrtinae ===
Auth: Gorochov, 1985; selected genera:

- Beybienkoana Gorochov, 1988
- Euscyrtodes Gorochov, 1987
- Euscyrtus Guérin-Méneville, 1844 - type genus
- Patiscus Stål, 1877

=== subfamily Oecanthinae ===
Auth: Blanchard, 1845: the tree crickets which are delicate white or pale green insects with transparent fore wings. Three tribes are now placed in two supertribes:

supertribe Diatrypidi Desutter-Grandcolas, 1988

1. monotypic genus Diatrypa Saussure, 1874

supertribe Oecanthidi Blanchard, 1845

- tribe Oecanthini Blanchard, 1845
- tribe Xabeini Vickery & Kevan, 1983
- unplaced genera

=== Podoscirtinae ===
Auth: Saussure, 1878; : previously a subfamily group containing the "anomalous crickets"

supertribe Hapithidi Gorochov, 1986

- tribe Aphonomorphini Desutter-Grandcolas, 1988
- tribe Cearacesaini Koçak & Kemal, 2010
- tribe Hapithini Gorochov, 1986
- tribe Phyllogryllini Campos, 2022

supertribe Podoscirtidi Saussure, 1878

- tribe Aphonoidini Gorochov, 2008
- tribe Podoscirtini Saussure, 1878
- tribe Truljaliini Gorochov, 2020
- Unplaced genera (extinct)

=== Tafaliscinae ===
Auth: Desutter-Grandcolas, 1988: previously incorporated in the Oecanthinae

supertribe Paroecanthidi Gorochov, 1986

- tribe Neometrypini Desutter-Grandcolas, 1988
- tribe Paroecanthini Gorochov, 1986

supertribe Tafaliscidi Desutter-Grandcolas, 1988

- tribe Tafaliscini Desutter-Grandcolas, 1988
  - Tafalisca Walker, 1869 - type genus
