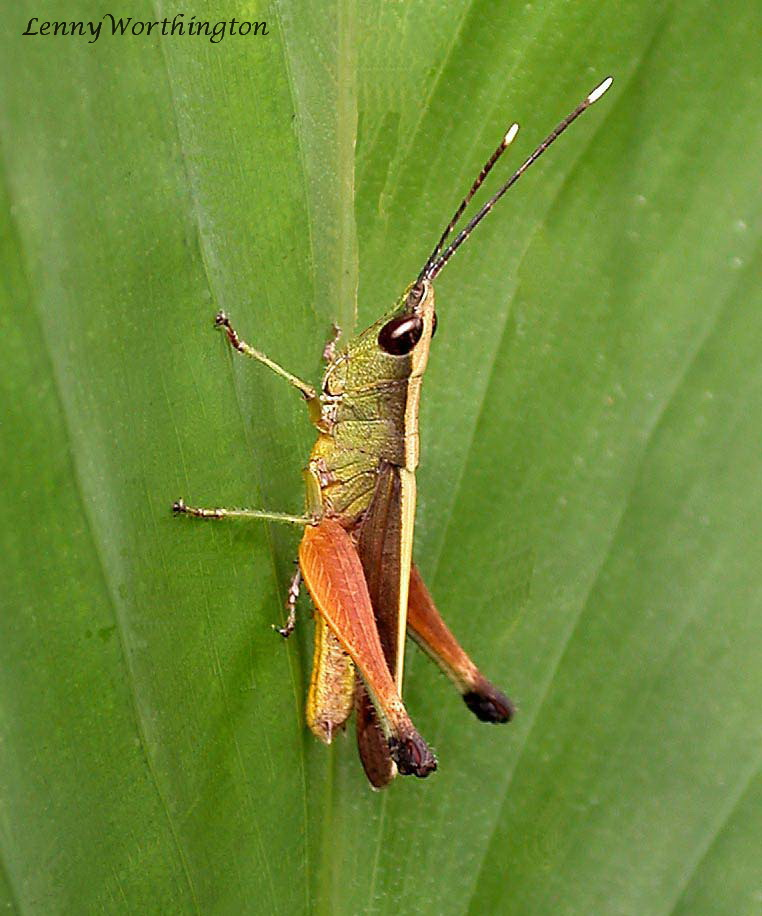
- Phlaeoba antennata, Thailand

Scientific classification
- Kingdom: Animalia
- Phylum: Arthropoda
- Clade: Pancrustacea
- Class: Insecta
- Order: Orthoptera
- Suborder: Caelifera
- Family: Acrididae
- Subfamily: Acridinae
- Tribe: Phlaeobini
- Genus: Phlaeoba
- Species: P. antennata

Binomial name
- Phlaeoba antennata Brunner von Wattenwyl, 1893

= Phlaeoba antennata =

Species of grasshopper

Phlaeoba antennata is a species of short-horned grasshopper in the family Acrididae. It is found in Indomalaya.

== Subspecies ==
These subspecies belong to the species Phlaeoba antennata:

- Phlaeoba antennata antennata Brunner von Wattenwyl, 1893
- Phlaeoba antennata malayensis Bolívar, 1914
