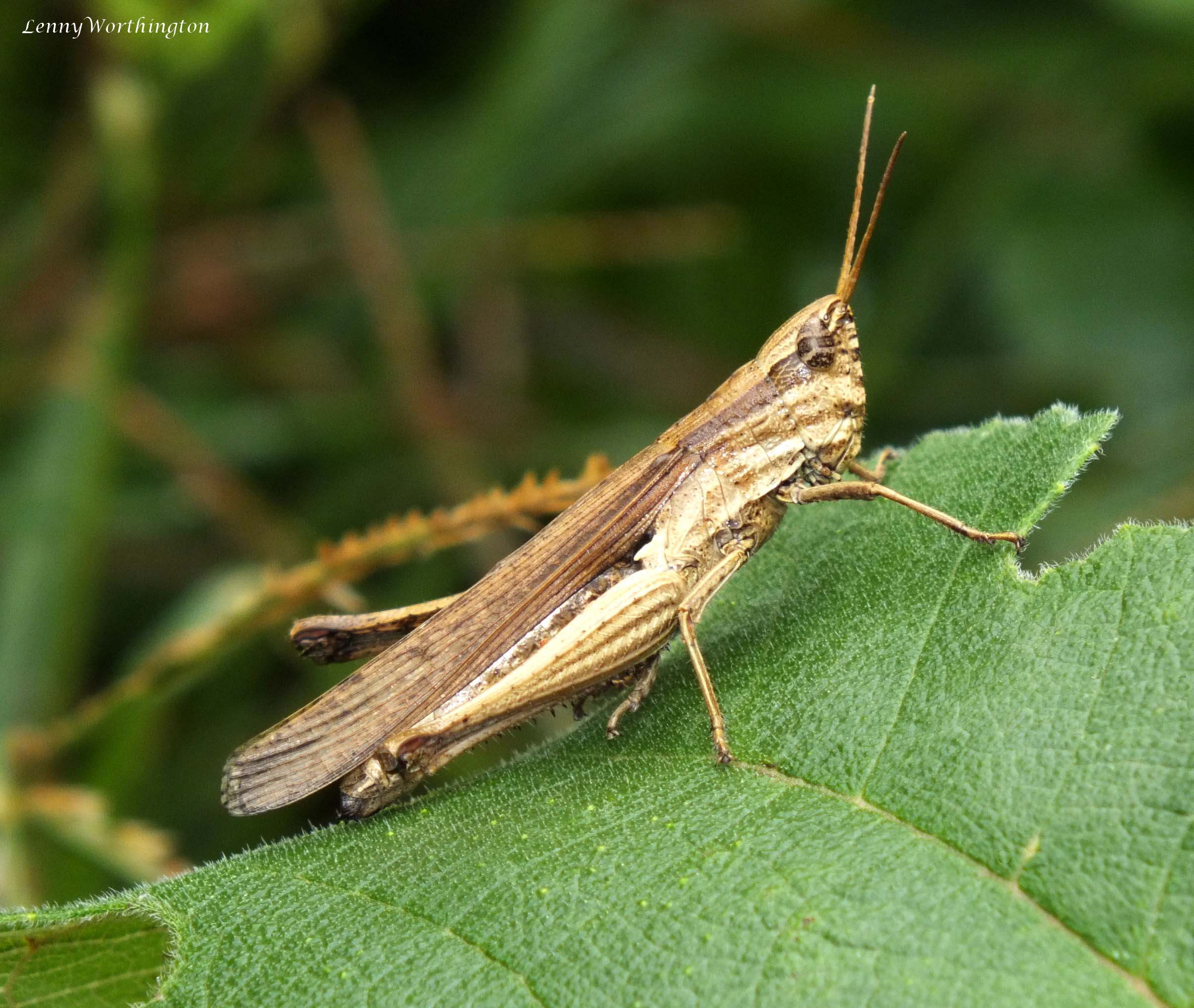
- Phlaeoba infumata, Thailand

Scientific classification
- Kingdom: Animalia
- Phylum: Arthropoda
- Clade: Pancrustacea
- Class: Insecta
- Order: Orthoptera
- Suborder: Caelifera
- Family: Acrididae
- Subfamily: Acridinae
- Tribe: Phlaeobini
- Genus: Phlaeoba
- Species: P. infumata

Binomial name
- Phlaeoba infumata Brunner von Wattenwyl, 1893

= Phlaeoba infumata =

Species of grasshopper

Phlaeoba infumata is a species of short-horned grasshopper in the family Acrididae. It is found in Indomalaya.
