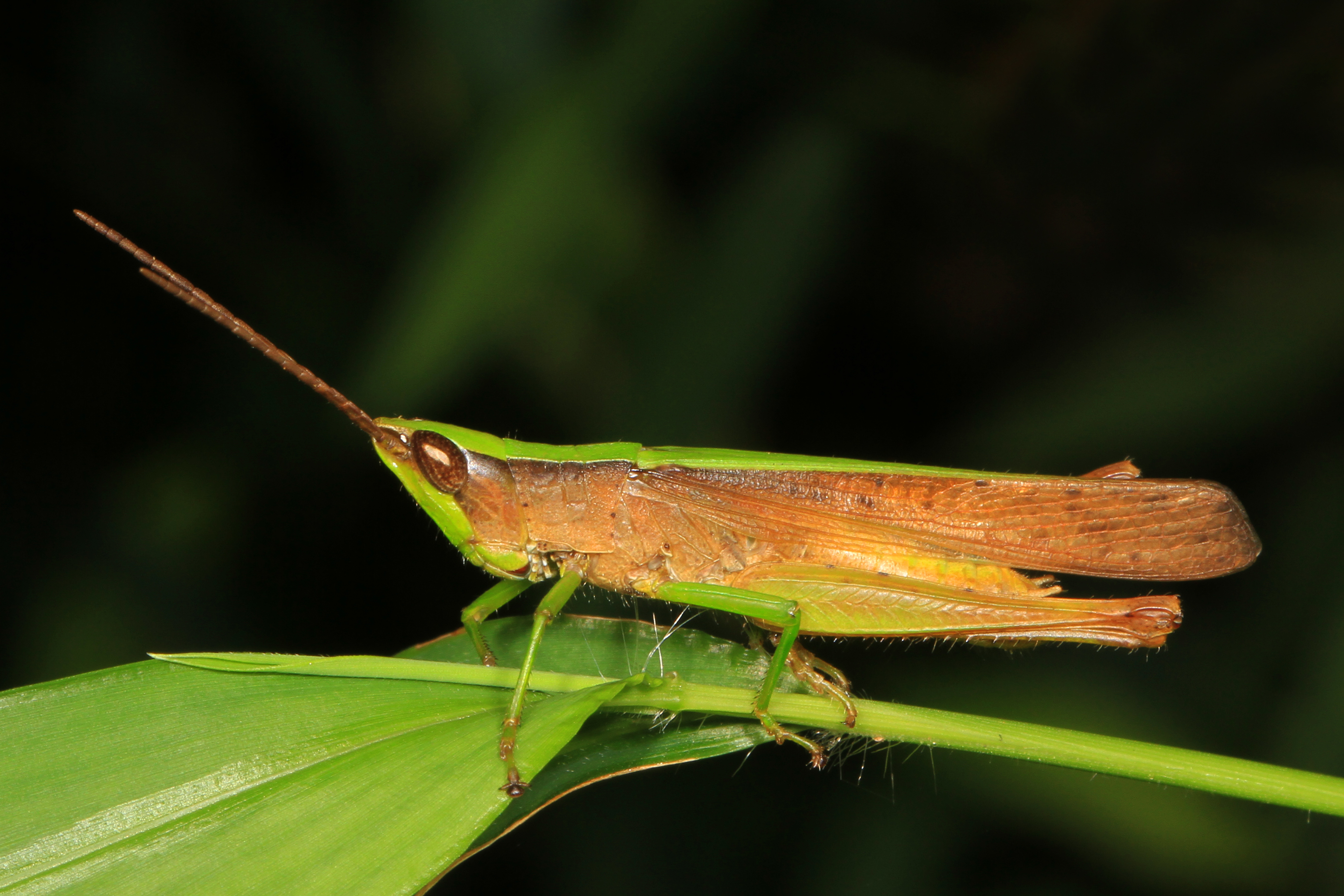

Scientific classification
- Kingdom: Animalia
- Phylum: Arthropoda
- Class: Insecta
- Order: Orthoptera
- Suborder: Caelifera
- Family: Acrididae
- Genus: Metaleptea
- Species: M. brevicornis

Binomial name
- Metaleptea brevicornis (Linnaeus, 1763)

Synonyms
- Gryllus brevicornis Linnaeus, 1763

= Metaleptea brevicornis =

Species of grasshopper

Metaleptea brevicornis, the clipped-wing grasshopper, is a species of grasshopper from North America.

== Distribution ==
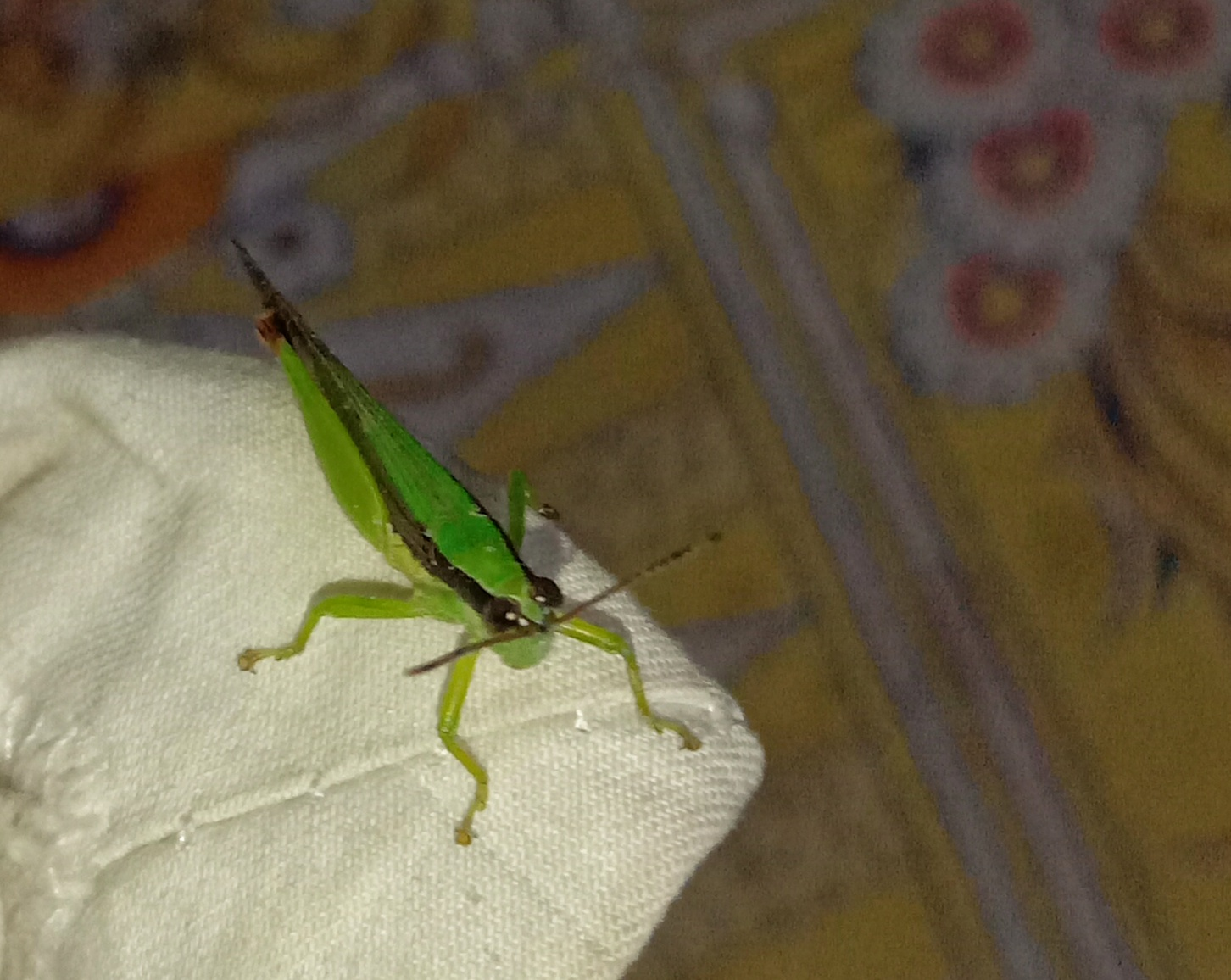
A clipped-wing grasshopper captured at night

Metaleptea brevicornis is found in wetlands across a large part of eastern North America, from the Great Lakes region south to Florida and Mexico.

== Taxonomy ==
Carl Linnaeus described Metaleptea brevicornis in his 1763 work Centuria Insectorum under the name Gryllus brevicornis. The genus Metaleptea was erected in 1893 by Carl Brunner von Wattenwyl to hold the "American species of the genus Truxalis Fabricius", including M. brevicornis. In 1897, Ermanno Giglio-Tos designated M. brevicornis as the type species of the genus Metaleptea, and included a second species, "Metaleptea minor", now treated as a subspecies of Eutryxalis filata. For some time, the genus contained only M. brevicornis, with two subspecies – M. b. brevicornis and M. b. adspersa – but the latter is now treated as a separate species, Metaleptea adspersa.
