= Vitalisia =

Scientific classification
- Domain: Eukaryota
- Kingdom: Animalia
- Phylum: Arthropoda
- Class: Insecta
- Order: Orthoptera
- Suborder: Caelifera
- Superfamily: Acridoidea
- Family: Acrididae
- Subfamily: Acridinae
- Genus: Vitalisia; Bolívar, 1914

Genera of insects

Vitalisia is a genus of grasshoppers in the subfamily Acridinae, with no tribe assigned. Two species have been recorded from Indochina from Bangladesh to peninsular Malaysia.

== Species ==
The Orthoptera Species File includes:

- Vitalisia bangiensus Mahmood, Samira & Idris, 2007
- Vitalisia cerambycina Bolívar, 1914 – type species

== Cerambycidae ==
Vitalisia Pic (1924) is an invalid junior homonym, applied to a genus of beetles in the family Cerambycidae. The genus of beetles with this name is in the family Cerambycidae, tribe Apomecynini; species were originally placed in the genus Zotale, which is presently treated as a subgenus within Mycerinopsis (e.g.,).

== See also ==
- Vitalisia alternata, a species of Longhorn beetle
- Vitalisia sumatrana, another species of Longhorn beetle
