= Oxyphlaeobella =

Scientific classification
- Kingdom: Animalia
- Phylum: Arthropoda
- Clade: Pancrustacea
- Class: Insecta
- Order: Orthoptera
- Suborder: Caelifera
- Family: Acrididae
- Subfamily: Acridinae
- Tribe: Phlaeobini
- Genus: Oxyphlaeobella; Ramme, 1941

Type species
- Oxyphlaeobella rugosa Ramme, 1941

Genus of grasshoppers

Oxyphlaeobella is a genus of grasshoppers in the family Acrididae, subfamily Acridinae. Species can be found in southern China, Indochina and more recently, the Philippines.

== Description ==
The head is narrow and pointed with the fastigium slightly longer than wide. The head, pronotum, and rear of the abdomen are heavily wrinkled. It differs from Chlorophlaeoba in the shape of its forewings and fastigium.

The genus was formally described by German entomologist Willy Ramme in 1940. The type species is a male O. rugosa, collected at an elevation of 2,800 m (9,200 ft) above sea level on Mt. Victoria (Nat Ma Taung) of the Chin Hills range in Myanmar.

== Species ==
Species and type localities include:

1. Oxyphlaeobella doitungensis Dawwrueng, Storozhenko & Suwannapoom, 2026 - N. Thailand
2. Oxyphlaeobella kongtumensis Mistshenko & Storozhenko, 1990 — Vietnam
3. Oxyphlaeobella philippina Storozhenko & Lapteva, 2026 - Mindoro Island, Philippines
4. Oxyphlaeobella rugosa Ramme, 1941 — Chin Hills, Myanmar
