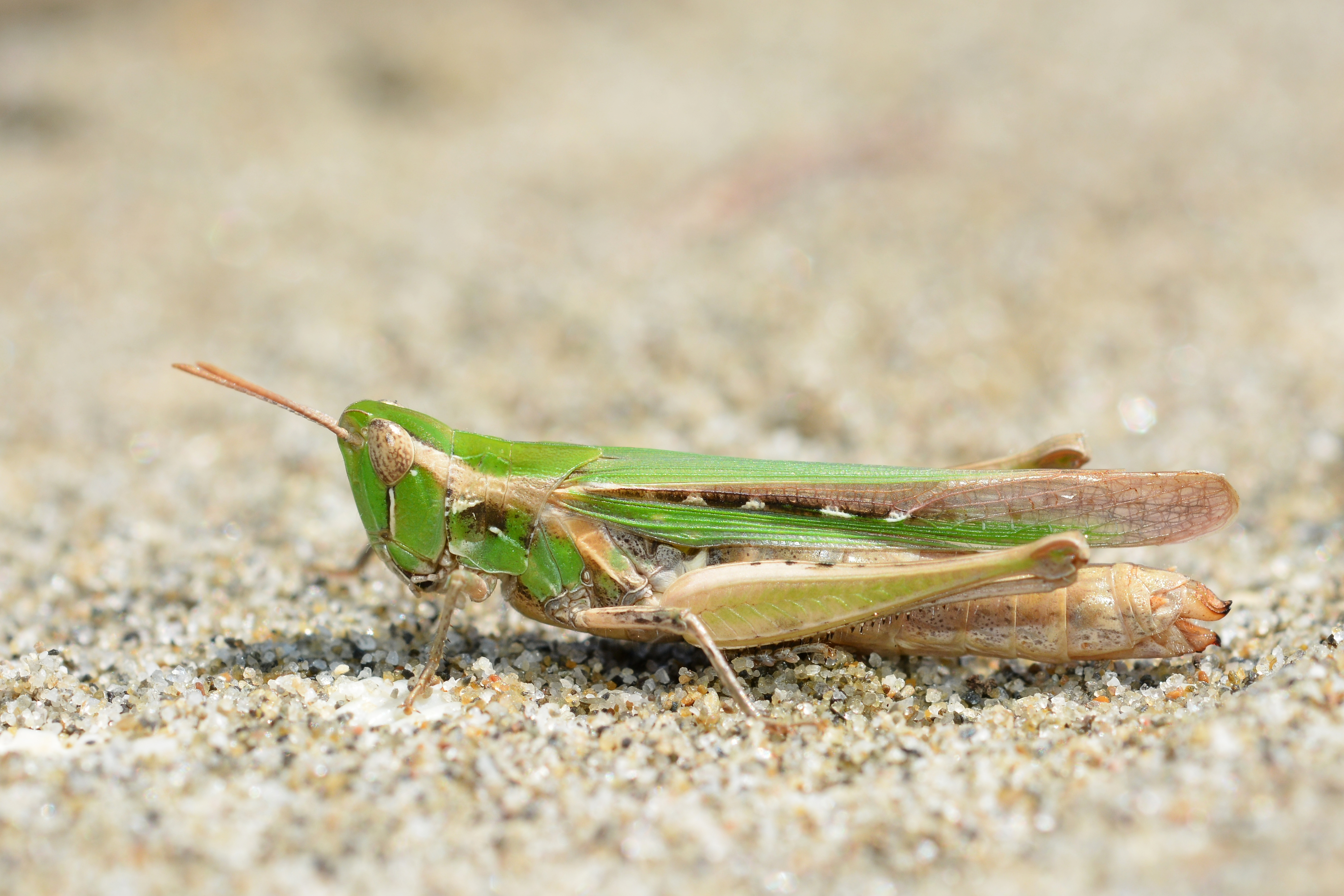

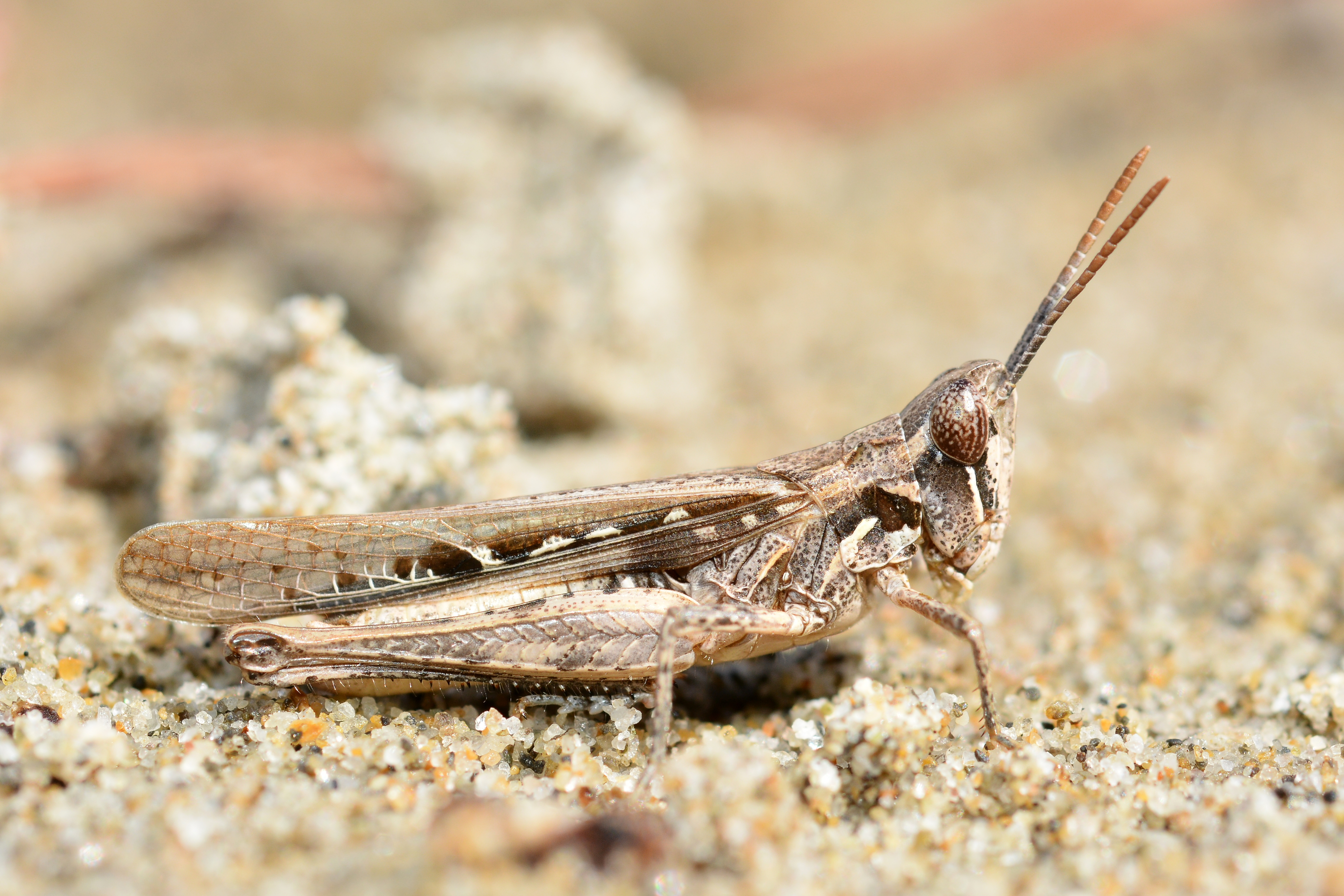
- Female and male (below)

Scientific classification
- Kingdom: Animalia
- Phylum: Arthropoda
- Clade: Pancrustacea
- Class: Insecta
- Order: Orthoptera
- Suborder: Caelifera
- Family: Acrididae
- Subfamily: Acridinae
- Tribe: Calephorini
- Genus: Calephorus
- Species: C. compressicornis

Binomial name
- Calephorus compressicornis (Latreille, 1804)

Synonyms
- Acrydium compressicornis Latreille 1804; Calephorus compressicornis camerunensis Sjöstedt 1931; Calephorus dubius (Rambur, 1838); Calephorus elegans Fieber, 1853; Calephorus venustus (Walker, 1870); Calephorus laetus (Walker, 1870); Gryllus dubius Rambur, 1838; Oxycoryphus compressicornis (Latreille, 1804); Oxycoryphus venustus Walker, 1870; Stenobothrus laetus Walker, 1870

= Calephorus compressicornis =

Species of grasshopper

Calephorus compressicornis (French: criquet des dunes) is a species of grasshopper in the tribe Calephorini found in Europe (France, Spain) and Africa.

Pierre André Latreille first described the species (as Acrydium compressicornis) in 1804. The type locality is the vicinity of Bordeaux, France.
