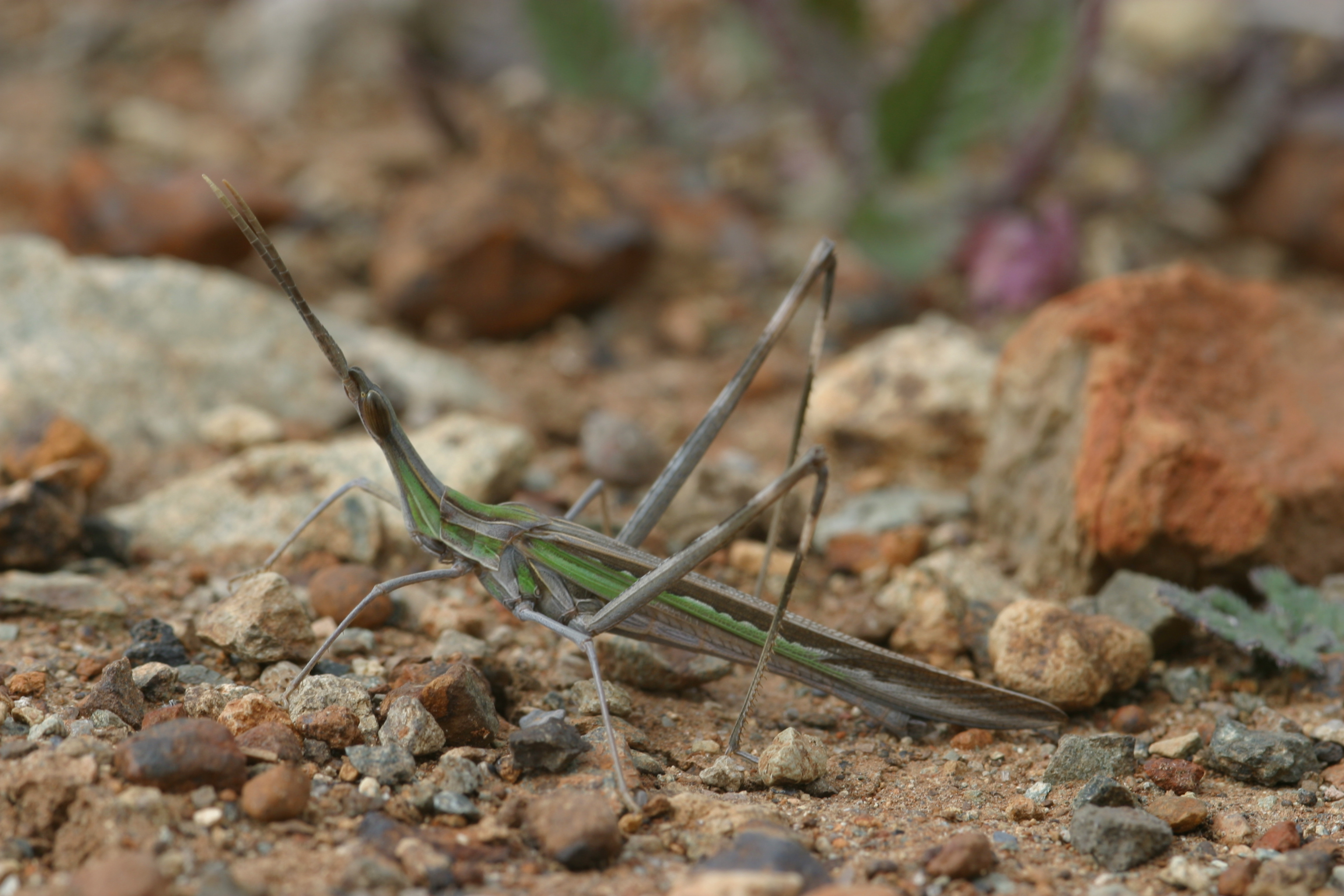
- Truxalis nasuta, Canary Islands

Scientific classification
- Kingdom: Animalia
- Phylum: Arthropoda
- Clade: Pancrustacea
- Class: Insecta
- Order: Orthoptera
- Suborder: Caelifera
- Family: Acrididae
- Subfamily: Acridinae
- Tribe: Truxalini
- Genus: Truxalis
- Species: T. nasuta

Binomial name
- Truxalis nasuta (Linnaeus, 1758)

= Truxalis nasuta =

Species of grasshopper

Truxalis nasuta is a species of short-horned grasshopper in the family Acrididae. It is found in Africa, Europe, and Asia.
