= Chlorophlaeoba =

Scientific classification
- Kingdom: Animalia
- Phylum: Arthropoda
- Clade: Pancrustacea
- Class: Insecta
- Order: Orthoptera
- Suborder: Caelifera
- Family: Acrididae
- Tribe: Phlaeobini
- Genus: Chlorophlaeoba; Ramme, 1941

Type species
- Chlorophlaeoba tonkinensis Ramme, 1941

Genus of grasshoppers

Chlorophlaeoba is a genus of grasshoppers in the family Acrididae, subfamily Acridinae. Species can be found in southern China and Indo-China.

The genus was formally described by German entomologist Willy Ramme in 1940. It was placed in the tribe Phlaeobini in a 2014 checklist of Vietnamese Orthoptera; the holotype is a male C. tonkinensis tonkinensis from Vietnam.

Chlorophlaeoba is similar to the genus Phlaeoba. In contrast with Phlaeoba, the head of Chlorophlaeoba substantially pointed, as long or longer than the pronotum, and the name suggests that species have an olive green colouration.

== Species ==
The Orthoptera Species File lists six species and two subspecies:

1. Chlorophlaeoba hongkongensis Zheng & Li, 2012
2. Chlorophlaeoba longiceps Liang & Zheng, 1988
3. Chlorophlaeoba longusala Zheng, 1982 – sometimes considered a synonym of C. tonkinensis
4. Chlorophlaeoba nigripennis Zheng, Lin, Xu & Ma, 2013
5. Chlorophlaeoba taiwanensis Yin, Li & Yin, 2007
6. Chlorophlaeoba tonkinensis Ramme, 1941
  1. Chlorophlaeoba tonkinensis tonkinensis Ramme, 1941
  2. Chlorophlaeoba tonkinensis siamensis Ingrisch, 1989
