= Machaeridia (insect) =

Scientific classification
- Kingdom: Animalia
- Phylum: Arthropoda
- Clade: Pancrustacea
- Class: Insecta
- Order: Orthoptera
- Suborder: Caelifera
- Superfamily: Acridoidea
- Family: Acrididae
- Subfamily: Acridinae
- Genus: Machaeridia; Stål, 1873

Synonyms
- Wilverthia Bolívar, 1908; Wilwerthia Uvarov, 1938

Genus of grasshoppers

Machaeridia is a genus of African grasshoppers in the subfamily Acridinae and tribe Pargaini.

== Species ==
The Orthoptera Species File lists:

1. Machaeridia bilineata Stål, 1873 - type species
2. Machaeridia conspersa Bolívar, 1889
