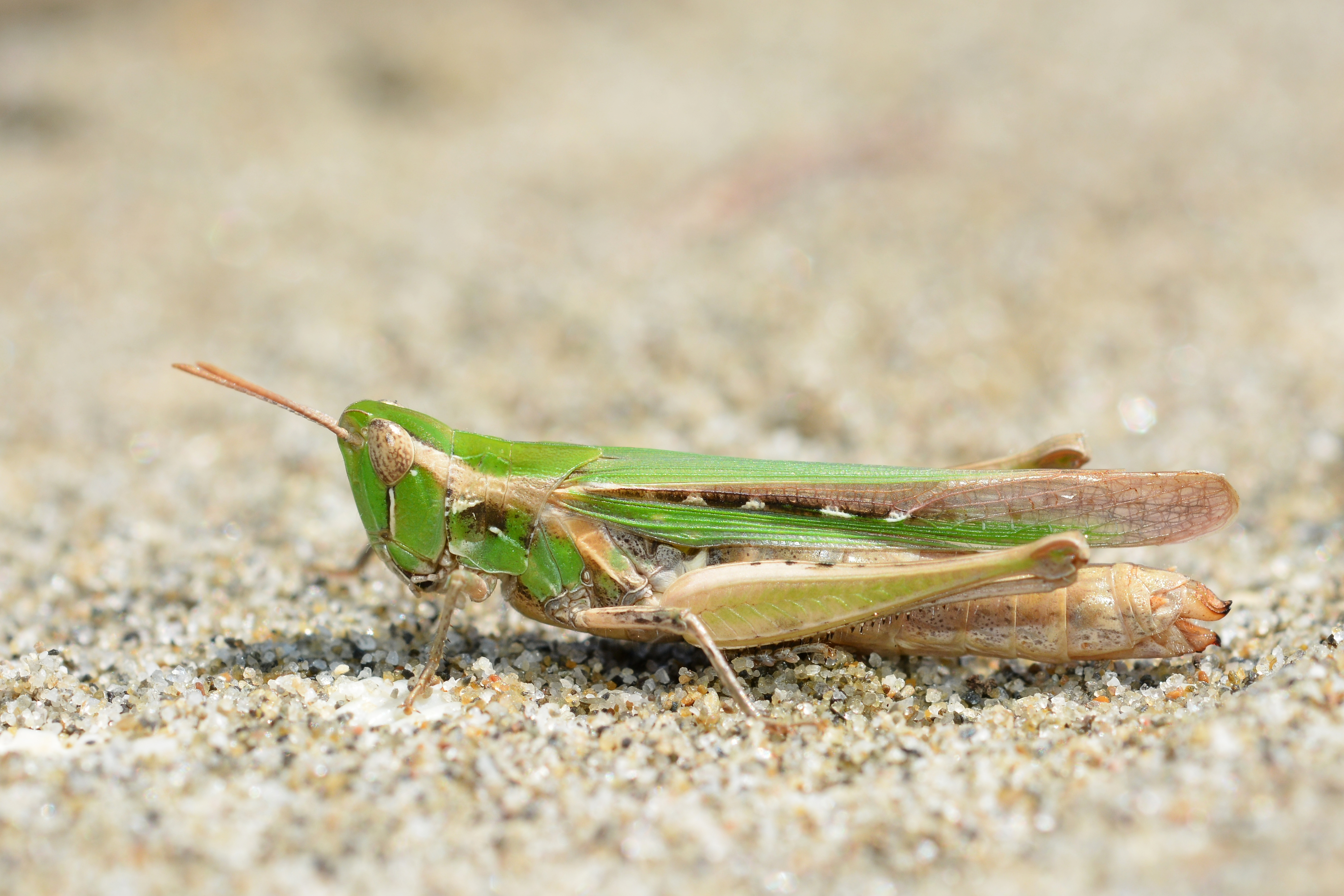
- Calephorus compressicornis

Scientific classification
- Kingdom: Animalia
- Phylum: Arthropoda
- Clade: Pancrustacea
- Class: Insecta
- Order: Orthoptera
- Suborder: Caelifera
- Family: Acrididae
- Subfamily: Acridinae
- Tribe: Calephorini
- Genus: Calephorus; Fieber, 1854

Synonyms
- Oxycoryphus Fischer, 1853

= Calephorus =

Genus of grasshoppers

Calephorus is the type genus of the Calephorini; a tribe of grasshoppers found in Africa, Europe and Indo-China.

== Species ==
1. Calephorus compressicornis (Latreille, 1804) - Europe, N Africa - type species (as "Acrydium compressicornis" Latreille)
2. Calephorus ornatus (Walker, F., 1870) - Madagascar
3. Calephorus vitalisi Bolivar, I., 1914 - Indo-China
