= Duroniella =

Scientific classification
- Kingdom: Animalia
- Phylum: Arthropoda
- Clade: Pancrustacea
- Class: Insecta
- Order: Orthoptera
- Suborder: Caelifera
- Family: Acrididae
- Subfamily: Acridinae
- Tribe: Phlaeobini
- Genus: Duroniella; Bolívar, 1908

Genus of grasshoppers

External image
- Images at iNaturalist

Duroniella is a genus of Palaearctic grasshoppers in the tribe Phlaeobini and now placed in genus group Duronia, erected by Ignacio Bolívar in 1908. Distribution records (probably incomplete) include: the North and Horn of Africa, Sardinia, Greece and the Balkans, through to central Asia.

== Species ==
The Orthoptera Species File lists:

1. Duroniella acuta Uvarov, 1952
2. Duroniella afghana Shumakov, 1956
3. Duroniella angustata Mistshenko, 1951
4. Duroniella brachyptera Umnov, 1931
5. Duroniella carinata Mistshenko, 1951
6. Duroniella cooperi Uvarov, 1943
7. Duroniella fracta (Krauss, 1890) - type species (as Duronia fracta Krauss)
8. Duroniella gracilis Uvarov, 1926
9. Duroniella iranica Bey-Bienko, 1948
10. Duroniella kalmyka (Adelung, 1906)
11. Duroniella kostylevi Bey-Bienko, 1948
12. Duroniella laeviceps Uvarov, 1938
13. Duroniella laticornis (Krauss, 1909)
14. Duroniella laurae (Bormans, 1885)
15. Duroniella lucasii (Bolívar, 1881)
16. Duroniella parallella Uvarov, 1952
17. Duroniella sogdiana Mistshenko, 1949
18. Duroniella turcomana Mistshenko, 1951
19. Duroniella volucris Uvarov, 1938
