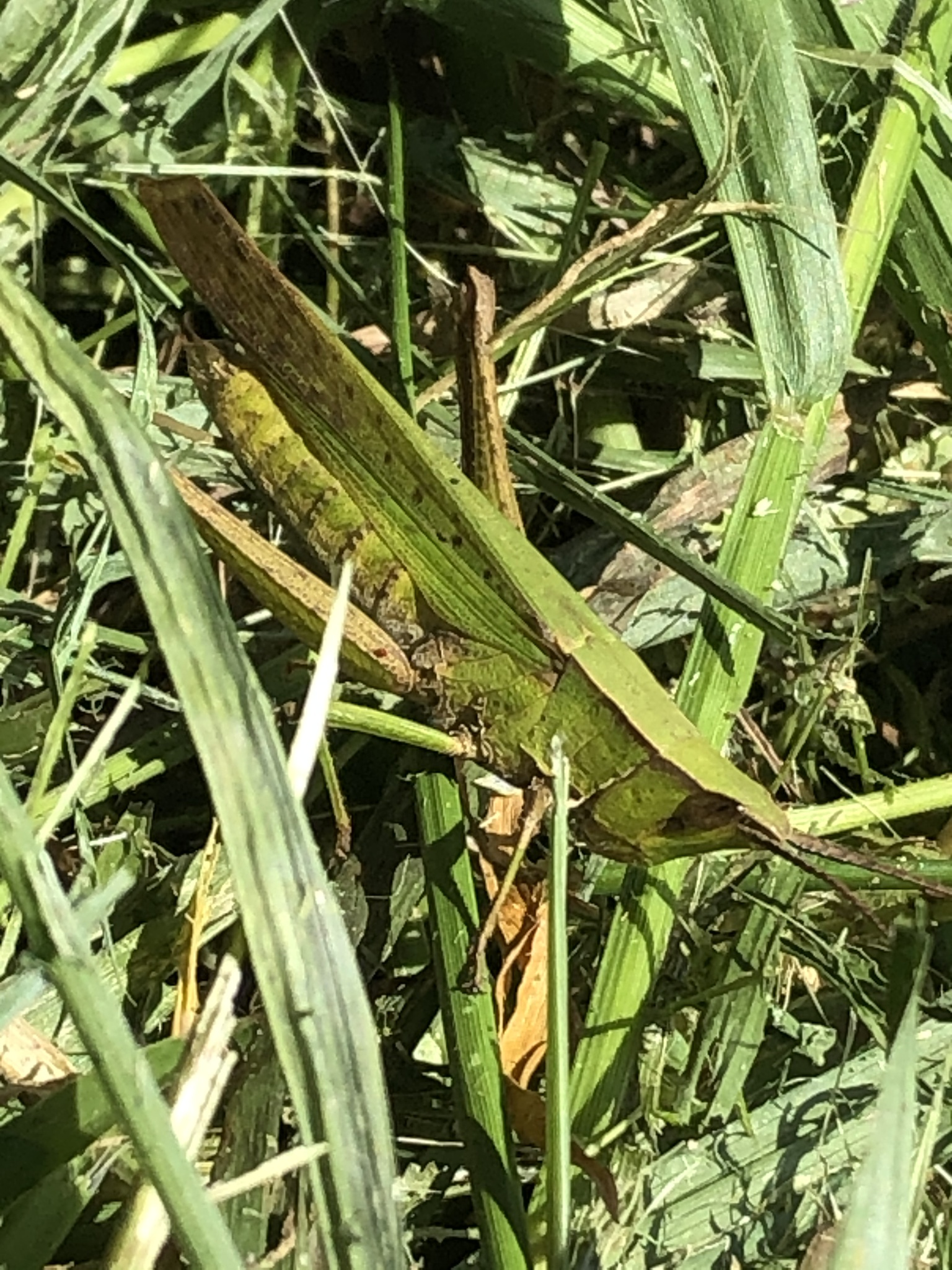
- Metaleptea adspersa, Perú

Scientific classification
- Domain: Eukaryota
- Kingdom: Animalia
- Phylum: Arthropoda
- Class: Insecta
- Order: Orthoptera
- Suborder: Caelifera
- Family: Acrididae
- Subfamily: Acridinae
- Tribe: Hyalopterygini
- Genus: Metaleptea; Giglio-Tos, 1897

= Metaleptea =

Genus of grasshoppers

Metaleptea is a genus of short-horned grasshoppers in the family Acrididae. There are at least two described species in Metaleptea, found in North, Central, and South America.

== Species ==
These species belong to the genus Metaleptea:

- Metaleptea adspersa (Blanchard, 1843)
- Metaleptea brevicornis (Johannson, 1763) (clip-wing grasshopper)
