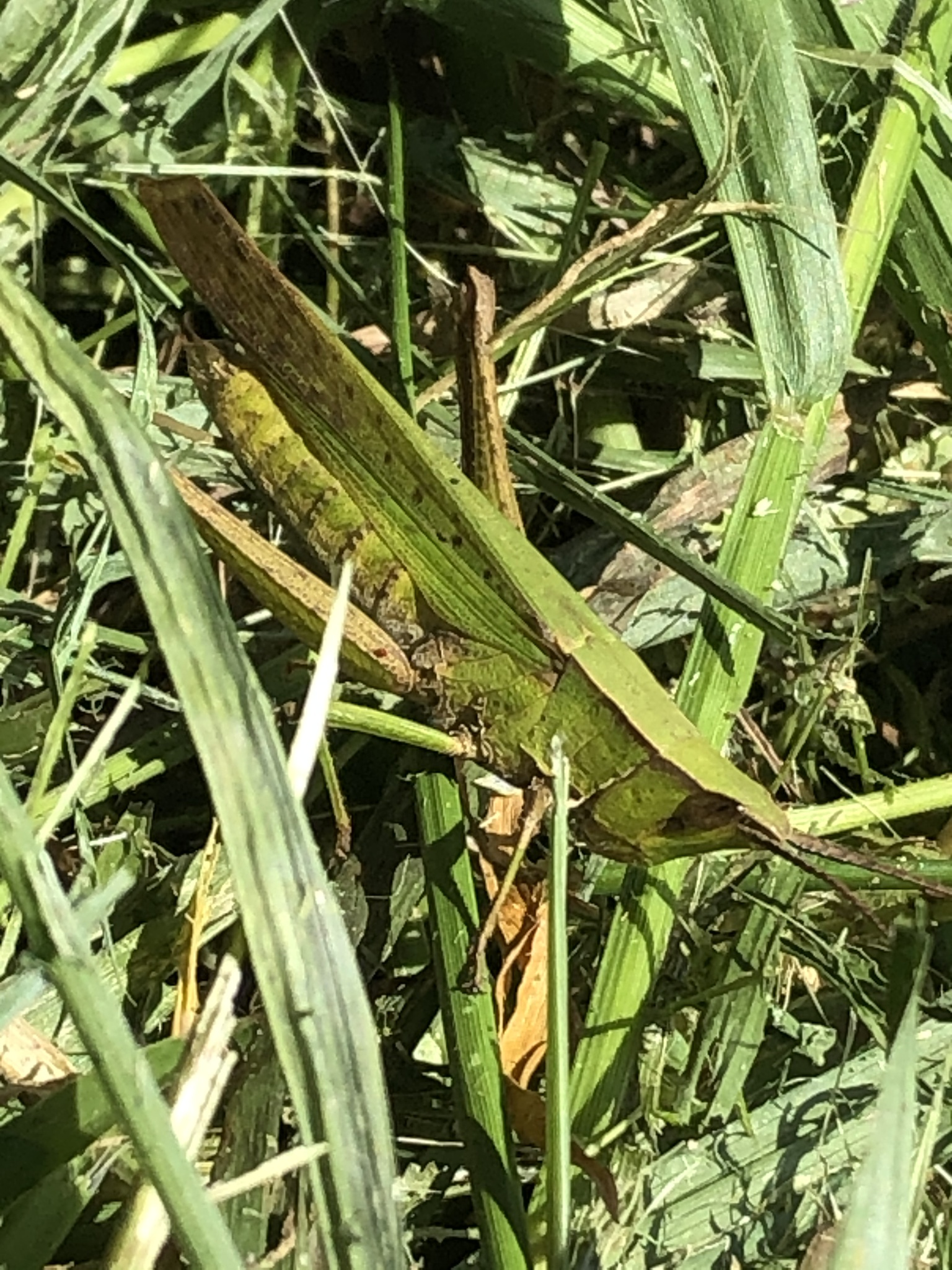
- Metaleptea adspersa, Perú

Scientific classification
- Domain: Eukaryota
- Kingdom: Animalia
- Phylum: Arthropoda
- Class: Insecta
- Order: Orthoptera
- Suborder: Caelifera
- Family: Acrididae
- Subfamily: Acridinae
- Tribe: Hyalopterygini
- Genus: Metaleptea
- Species: M. adspersa

Binomial name
- Metaleptea adspersa (Blanchard, 1843)

= Metaleptea adspersa =

Species of short-horned grasshopper

Metaleptea adspersa is a species of short-horned grasshopper in the family Acrididae. It is found in Central and South America.
