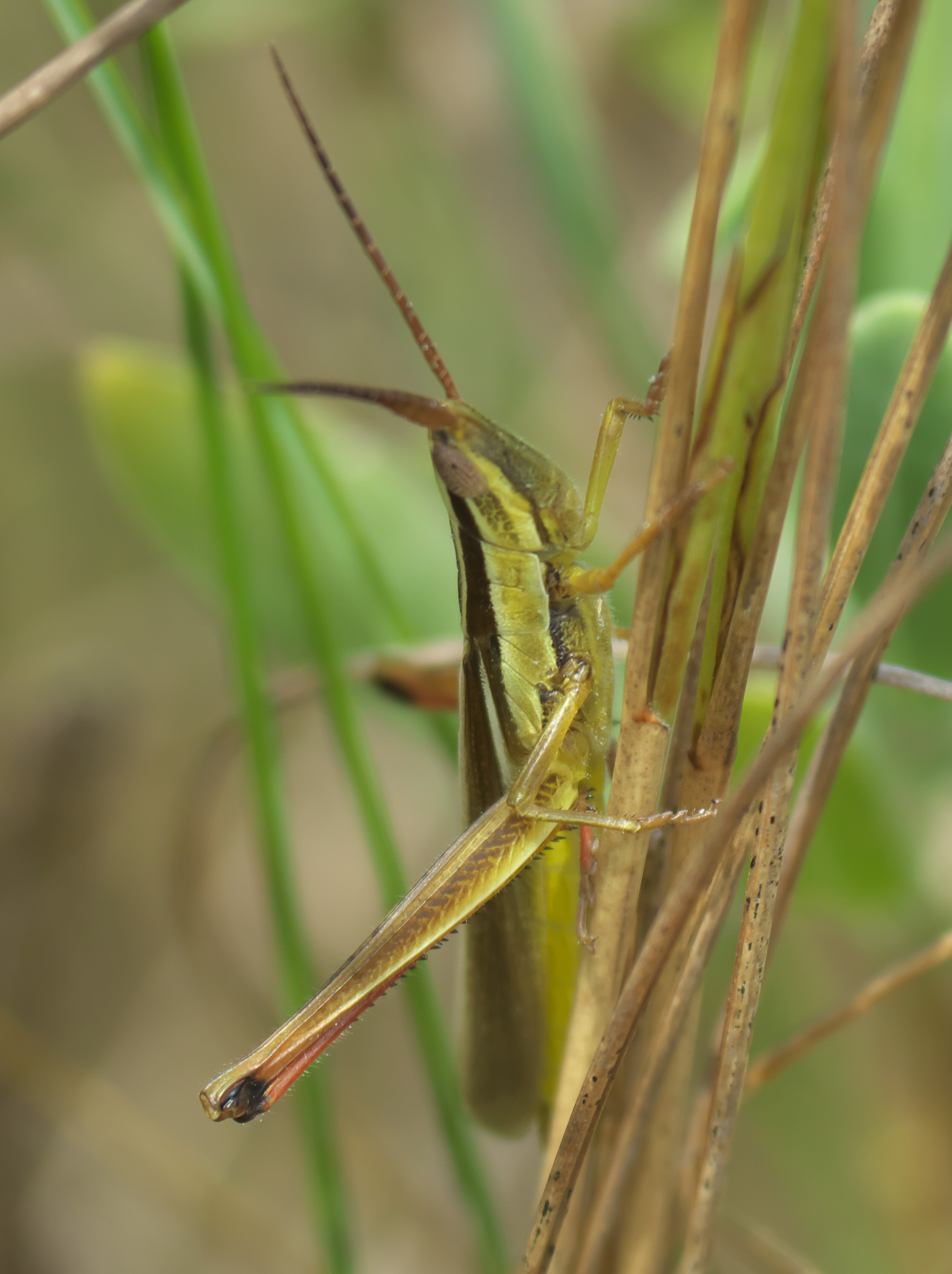

Scientific classification
- Kingdom: Animalia
- Phylum: Arthropoda
- Clade: Pancrustacea
- Class: Insecta
- Order: Orthoptera
- Suborder: Caelifera
- Family: Acrididae
- Tribe: Mermiriini
- Genus: Mermiria
- Species: M. intertexta

Binomial name
- Mermiria intertexta Scudder, 1899

= Mermiria intertexta =

Species of grasshopper

Mermiria intertexta, the eastern mermiria, is a species of slant-faced grasshopper in the family Acrididae. It is found in North America.
