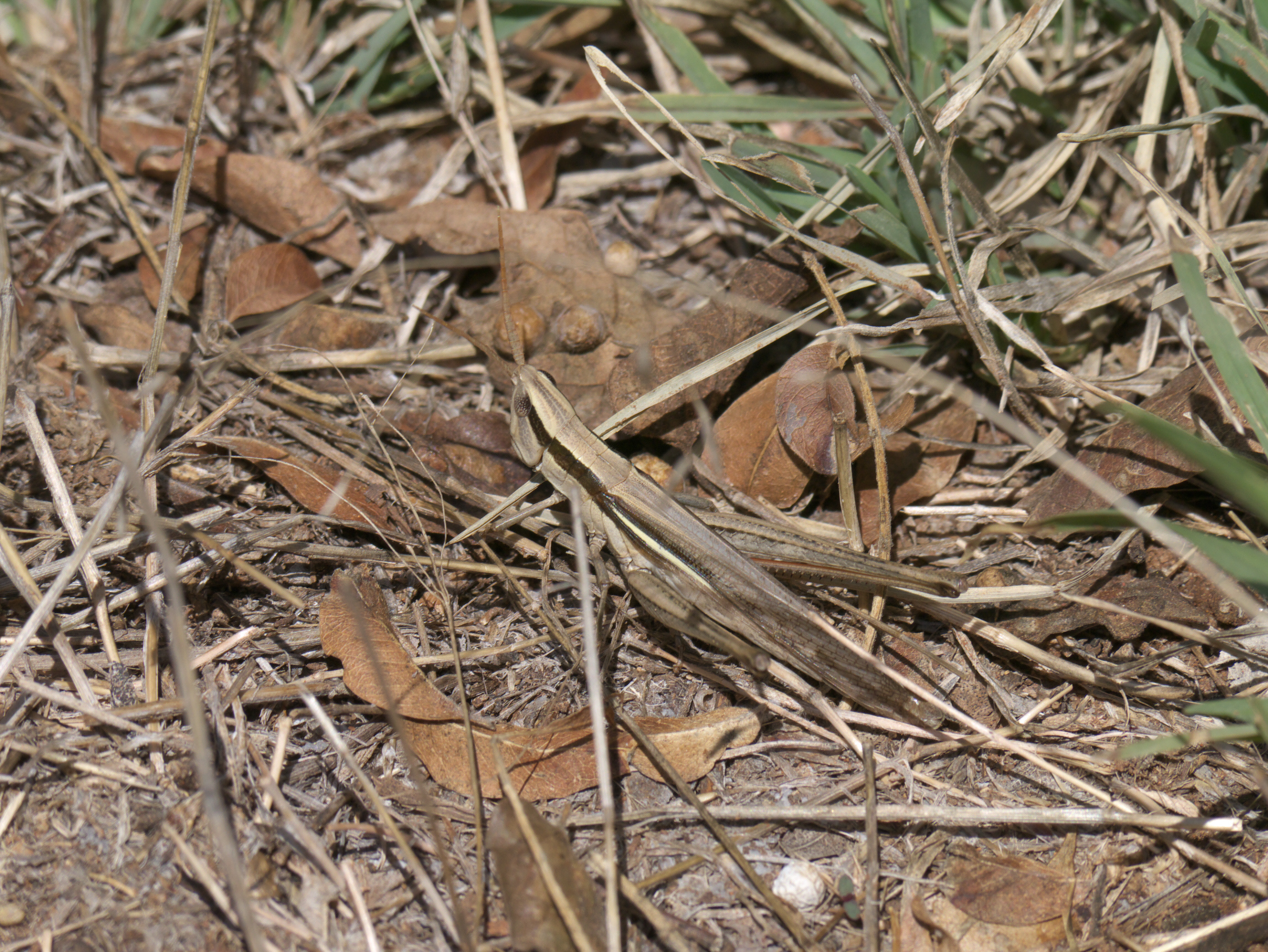

Scientific classification
- Kingdom: Animalia
- Phylum: Arthropoda
- Clade: Pancrustacea
- Class: Insecta
- Order: Orthoptera
- Suborder: Caelifera
- Family: Acrididae
- Tribe: Mermiriini
- Genus: Mermiria
- Species: M. bivittata

Binomial name
- Mermiria bivittata (Serville, 1839)

= Mermiria bivittata =

Species of grasshopper

Mermiria bivittata, known generally as two-striped mermiria, is a species of slant-faced grasshopper in the family Acrididae. Other common names include the two-striped slantface grasshopper and mermiria grasshopper. It is found in Central America and North America.

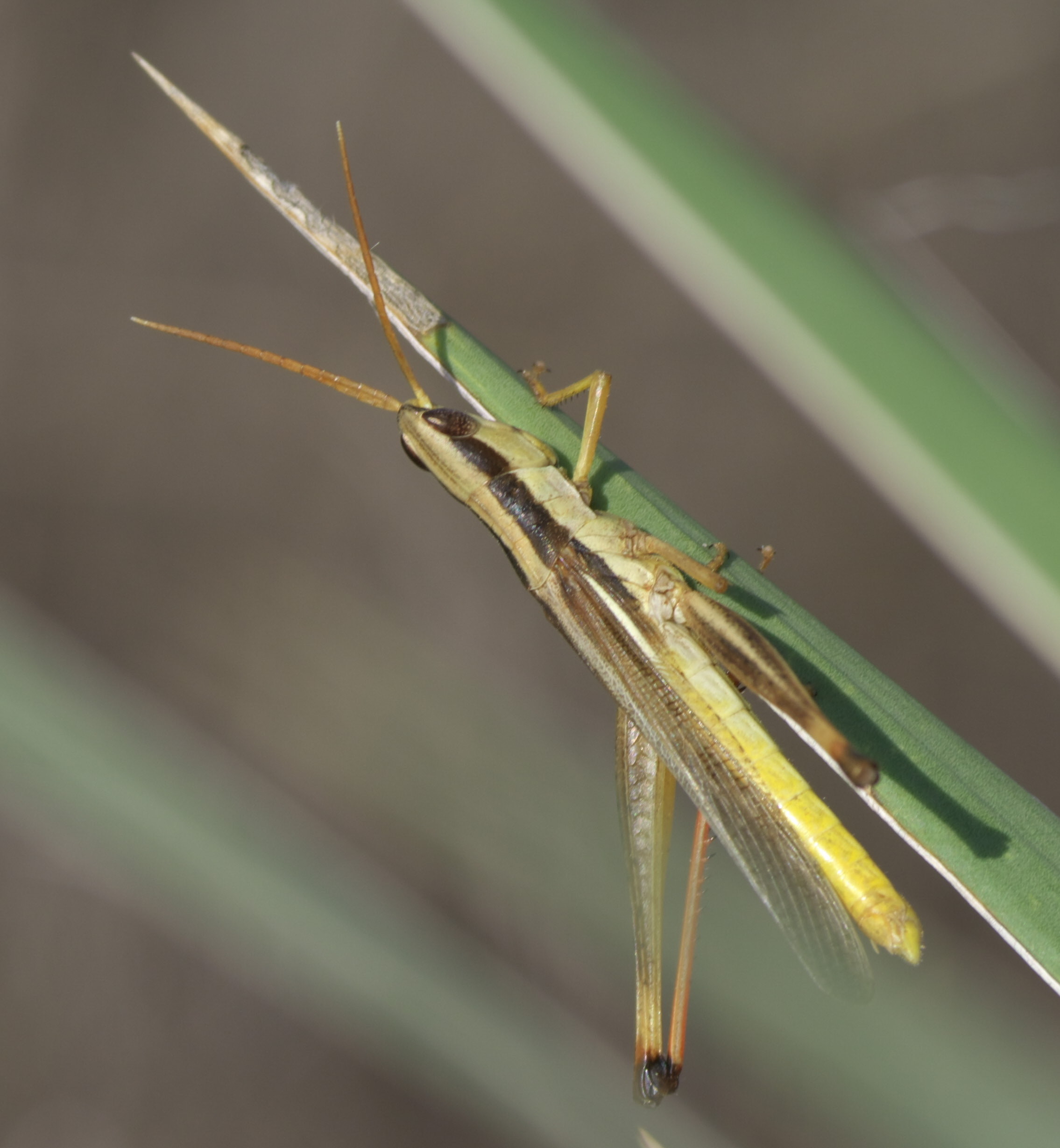
Two-striped mermiria, Mermiria bivittata

== Subspecies ==
The two subspecies belong to the species Mermiria bivittata:

- Mermiria bivittata bivittata
- Mermiria bivittata maculipennis
