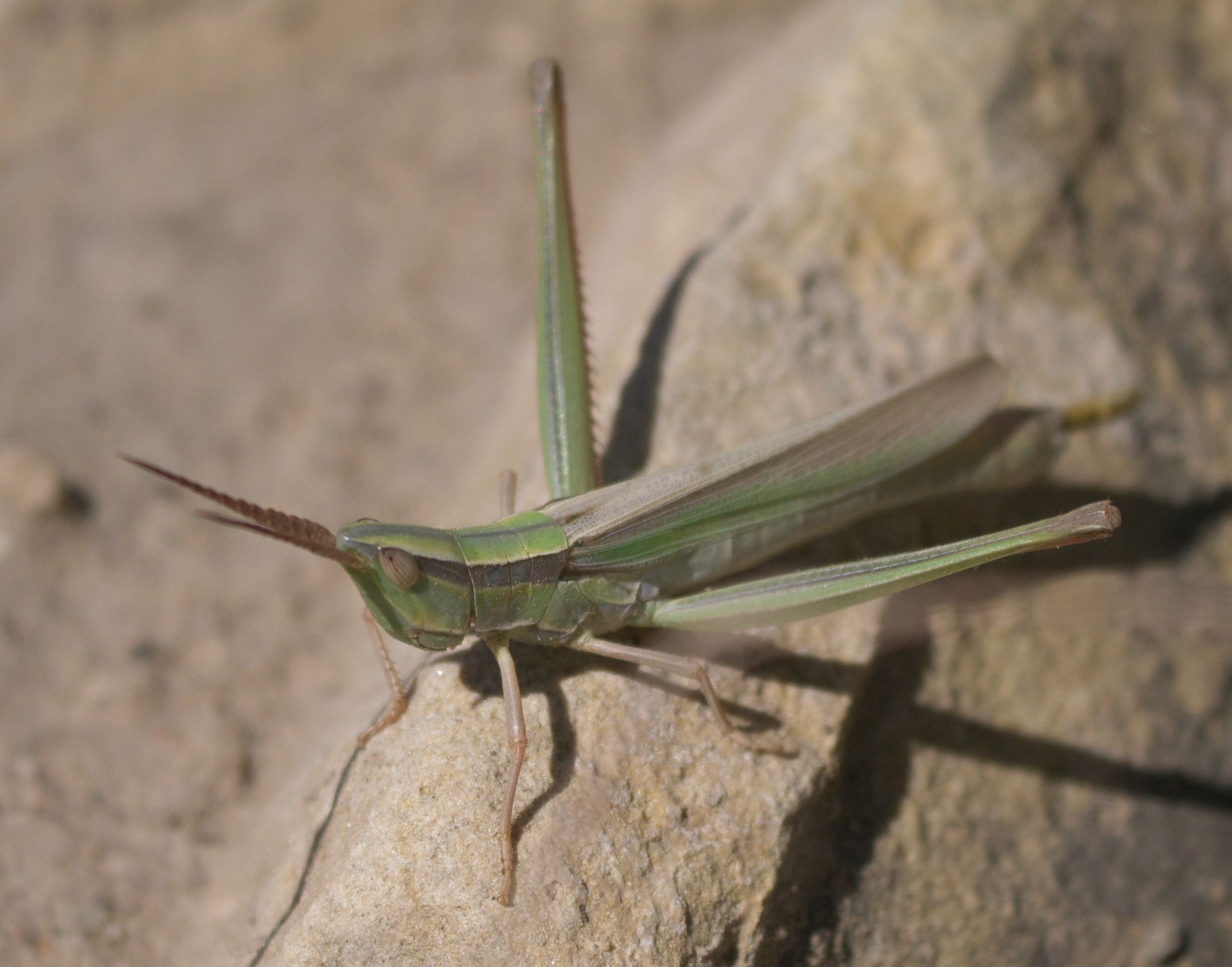

Scientific classification
- Kingdom: Animalia
- Phylum: Arthropoda
- Clade: Pancrustacea
- Class: Insecta
- Order: Orthoptera
- Suborder: Caelifera
- Family: Acrididae
- Tribe: Mermiriini
- Genus: Mermiria
- Species: M. picta

Binomial name
- Mermiria picta (Walker, 1870)

= Mermiria picta =

Species of grasshopper

Mermiria picta, the lively mermiria, is a species of slant-faced grasshopper in the family Acrididae. It is found in Central America and North America.
