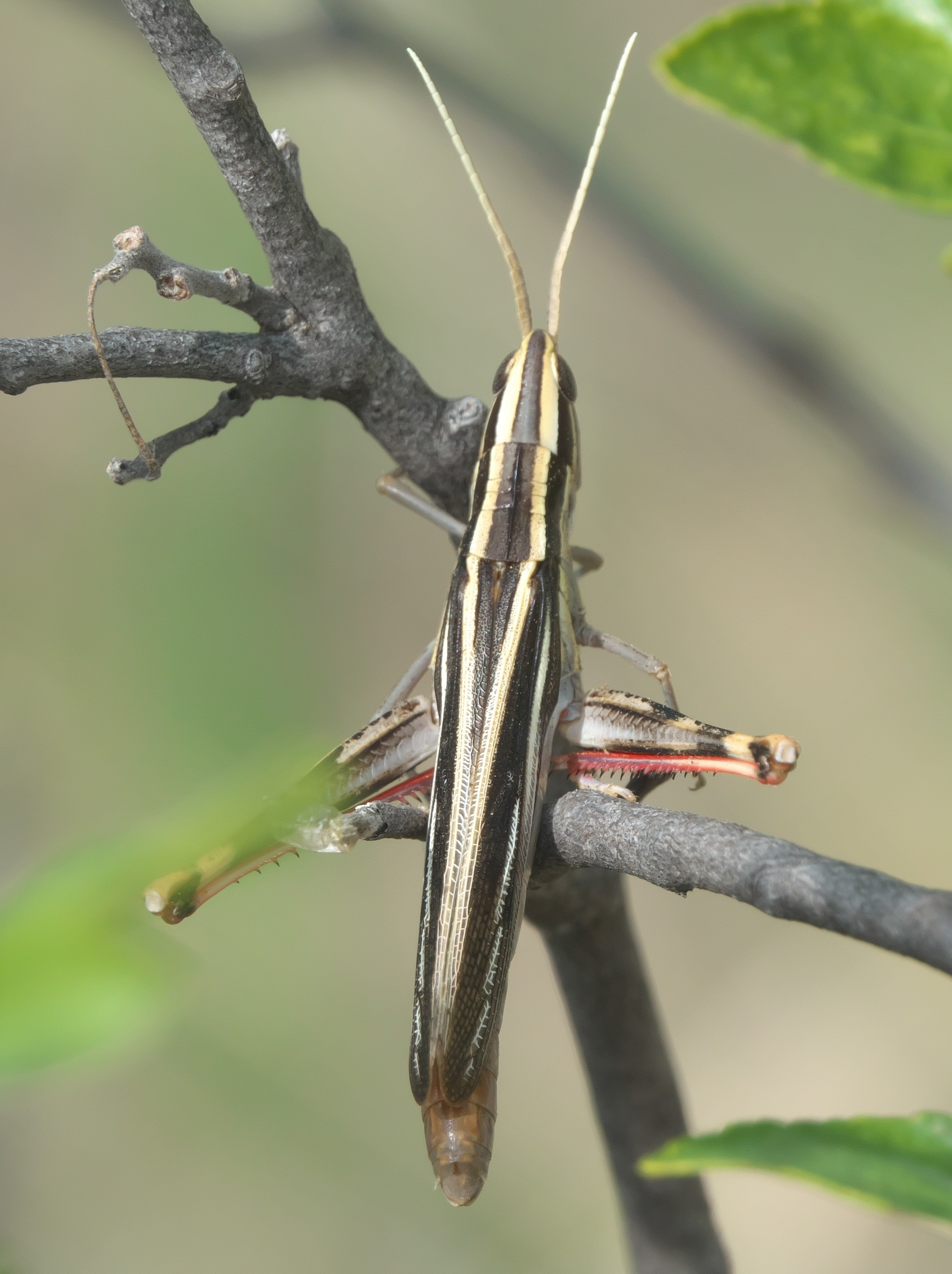
- Mermiria texana, Oklahoma

Scientific classification
- Kingdom: Animalia
- Phylum: Arthropoda
- Clade: Pancrustacea
- Class: Insecta
- Order: Orthoptera
- Suborder: Caelifera
- Family: Acrididae
- Tribe: Mermiriini
- Genus: Mermiria
- Species: M. texana

Binomial name
- Mermiria texana Bruner, 1889

= Mermiria texana =

Species of grasshopper

Mermiria texana, known generally as the Texas mermiria or Texas slant-face grasshopper, is a species of slant-faced grasshopper in the family Acrididae. It is found in Central America and North America.
