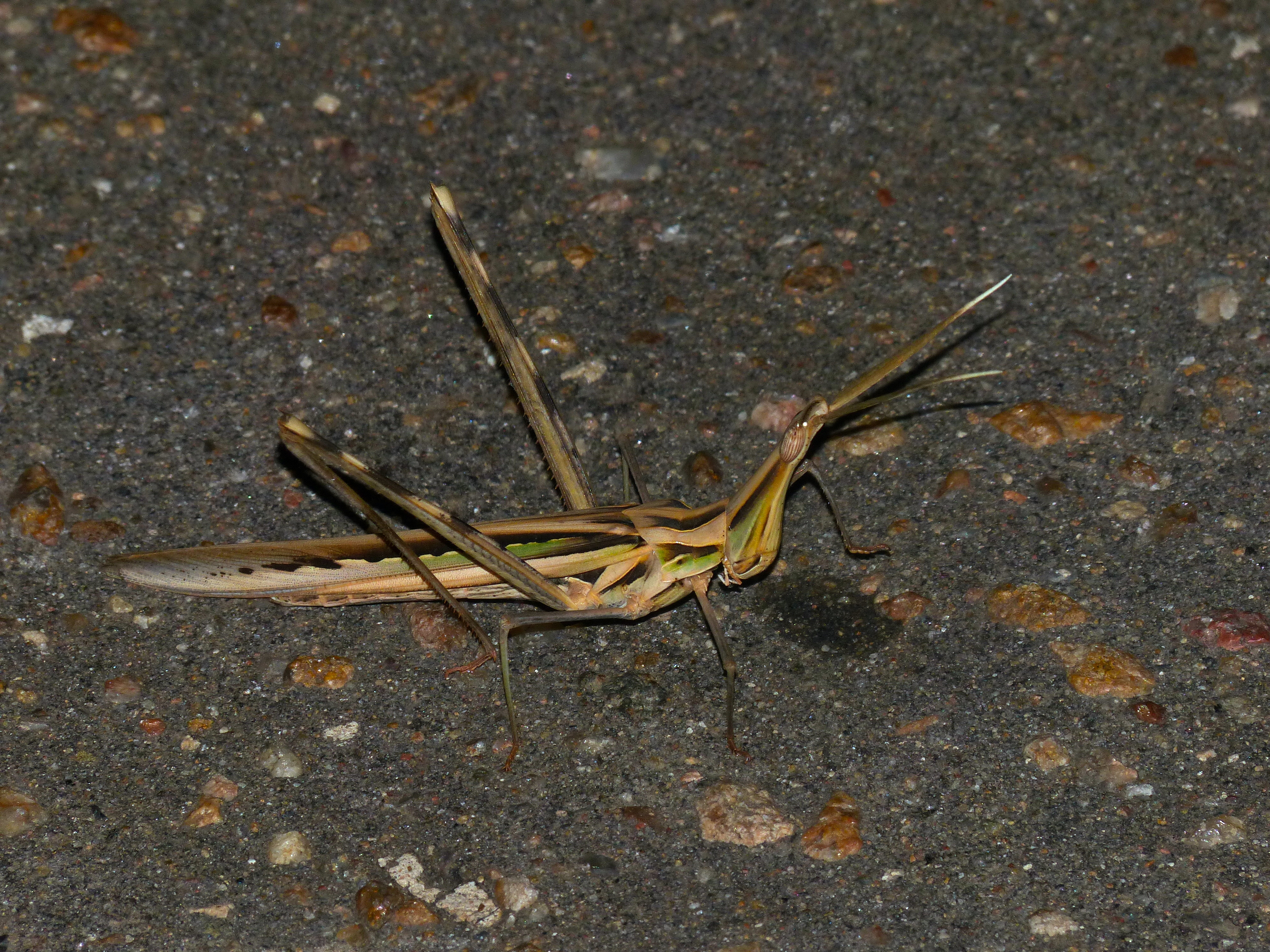
- Truxalis burtti

Scientific classification
- Kingdom: Animalia
- Phylum: Arthropoda
- Clade: Pancrustacea
- Class: Insecta
- Order: Orthoptera
- Suborder: Caelifera
- Family: Acrididae
- Subfamily: Acridinae
- Tribe: Truxalini
- Genus: Truxalis; Fabricius, 1775

Synonyms
- Acridella Bolívar, 1893; Troxalis Kittary, 1849; Tryxalis Brullé, 1835

= Truxalis =

Genus of grasshoppers

Truxalis is a genus of grasshoppers in the family Acrididae, subfamily Acridinae and tribe Truxalini. Species can be found in: Africa, the Iberian peninsula, Asia minor through to Indo-China.

== Species ==
The Orthoptera Species File and Catalogue of Life list:

- Truxalis afghana Bey-Bienko, 1963
- Truxalis annulata Thunberg, 1815
- Truxalis arabica Uvarov, 1933
- Truxalis bolivari Dirsh, 1950
- Truxalis burtti Dirsh, 1950
- Truxalis conspurcata Klug, 1840
- Truxalis eximia Eichwald, 1830
- Truxalis fitzgeraldi Dirsh, 1950
- Truxalis grandis Klug, 1830
- Truxalis guangzhouensis Liang, 1989
- Truxalis huangliuensis Liu & Li, 1995
- Truxalis indica Bolívar, 1902
- Truxalis johnstoni Dirsh, 1950
- Truxalis longicornis Krauss, 1902
- Truxalis mesopotamica Dirsh, 1950
- Truxalis nasuta Linnaeus, 1758 - type species (as Gryllus nasutus Linnaeus)
- Truxalis obesa Bey-Bienko, 1960
- Truxalis philbyi Dirsh, 1951
- Truxalis procera Klug, 1830
- Truxalis robusta Uvarov, 1916
- Truxalis rubripennis Dirsh, 1950
- Truxalis siamensis Dirsh, 1950
- Truxalis viridifasciata Krauss, 1902

== Gallery ==
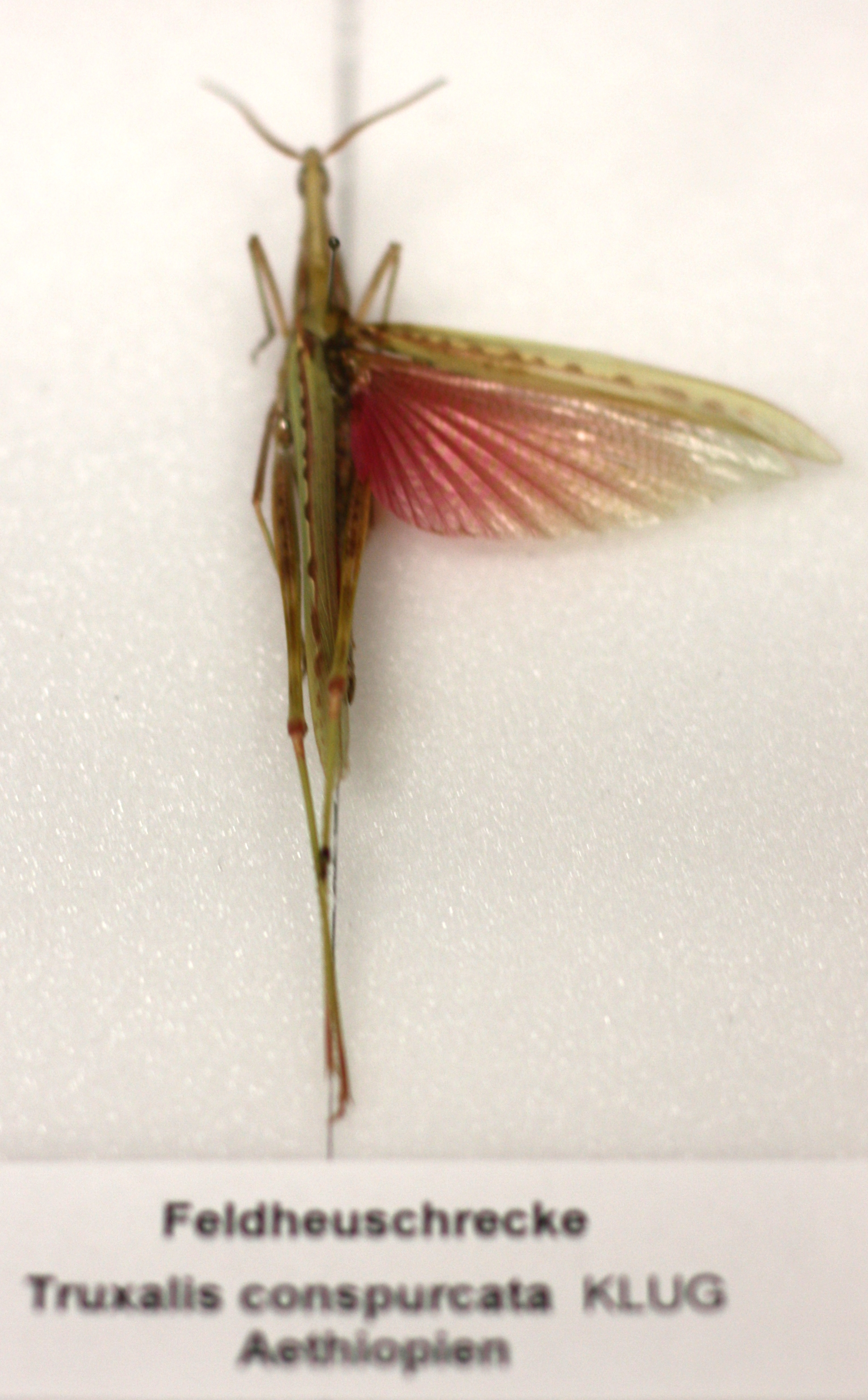
Truxalis conspurcata

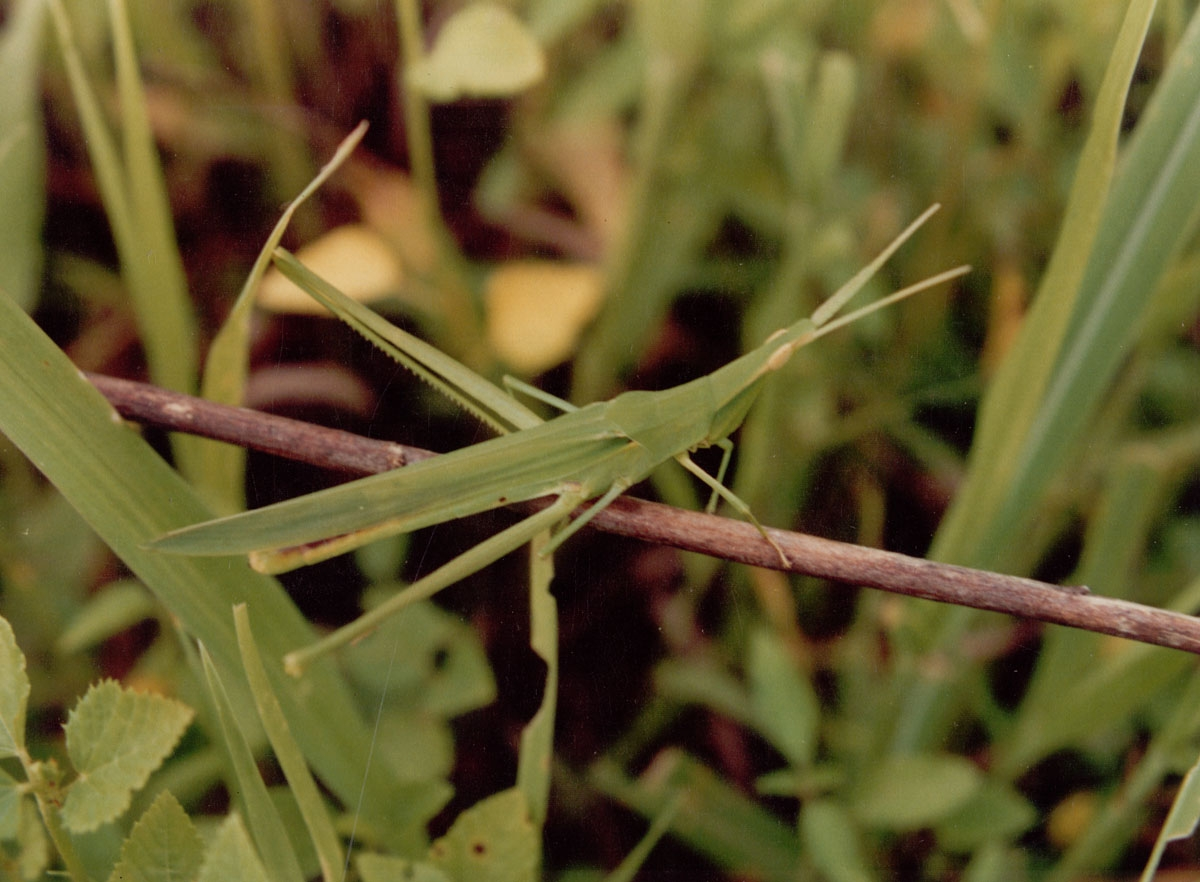
Truxalis johnstoni

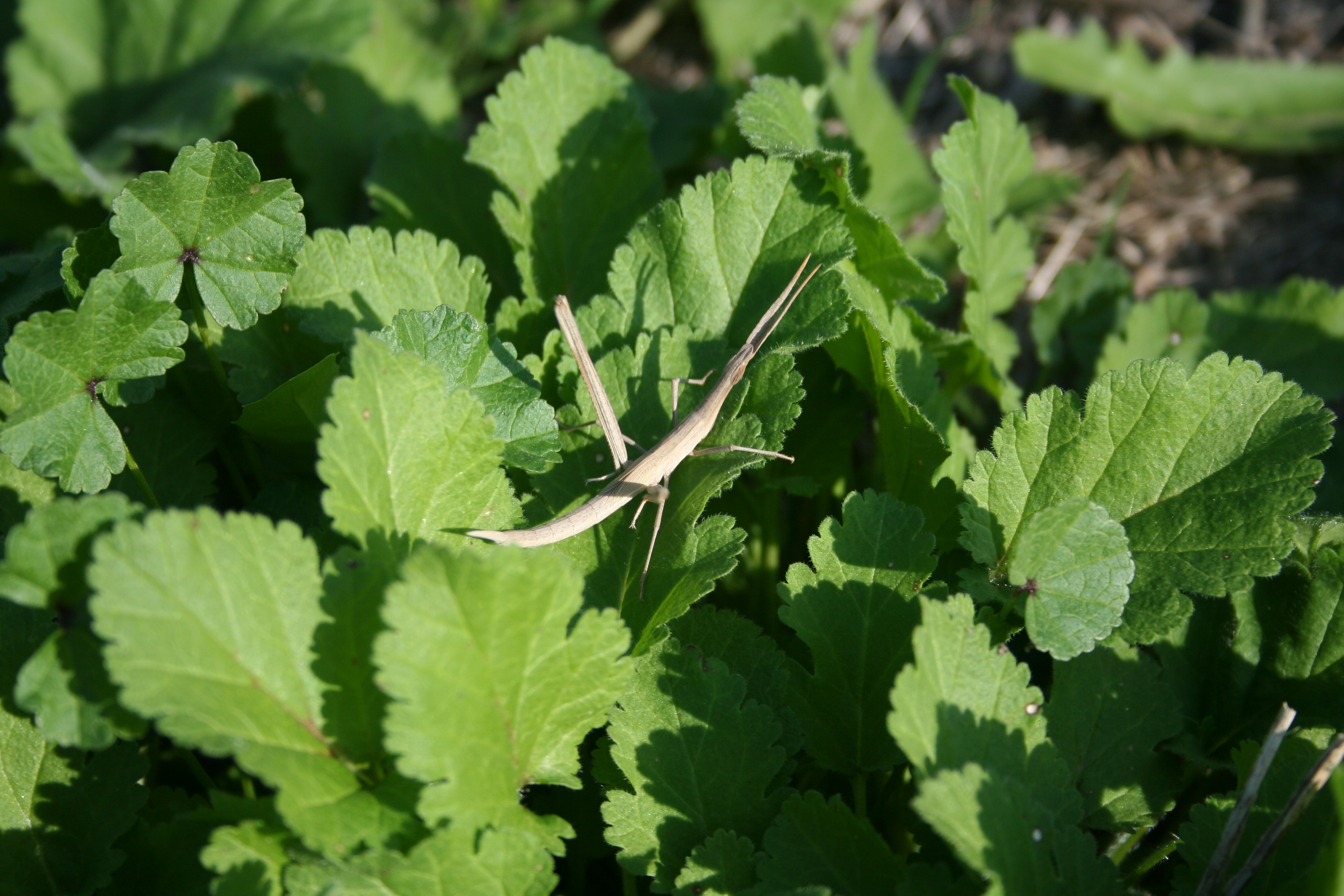
Unidentified Truxalis sp.
