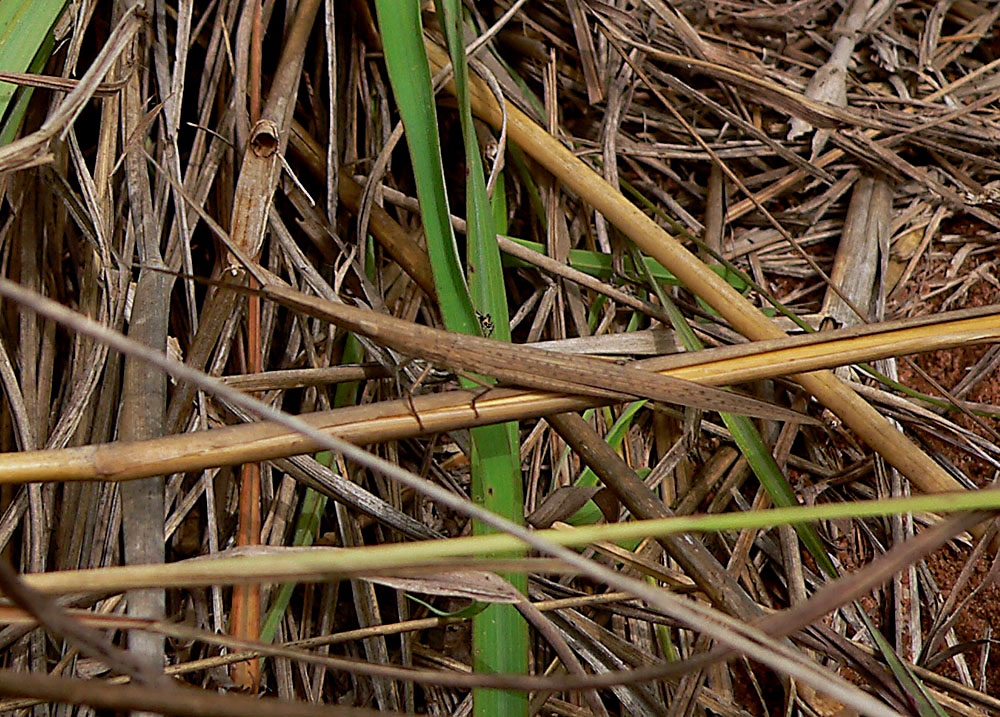
- Cannula gracilis

Scientific classification
- Kingdom: Animalia
- Phylum: Arthropoda
- Clade: Pancrustacea
- Class: Insecta
- Order: Orthoptera
- Suborder: Caelifera
- Family: Acrididae
- Tribe: Phlaeobini
- Genus: Cannula; Bolívar, 1906

= Cannula (grasshopper) =

Genus of grasshoppers

Cannula is a genus of African grasshoppers in the family Acrididae. There are at least three described species in Cannula.

== Species ==
These three species belong to the genus Cannula:

- Cannula gracilis (Burmeister, H., 1838)^{c g}
- Cannula karschi (Kirby, W.F., 1910)^{c g}
- Cannula vestigialis Roy, R., 2003^{c g}

Data sources: i = ITIS, c = Catalogue of Life, g = GBIF, b = Bugguide.net
