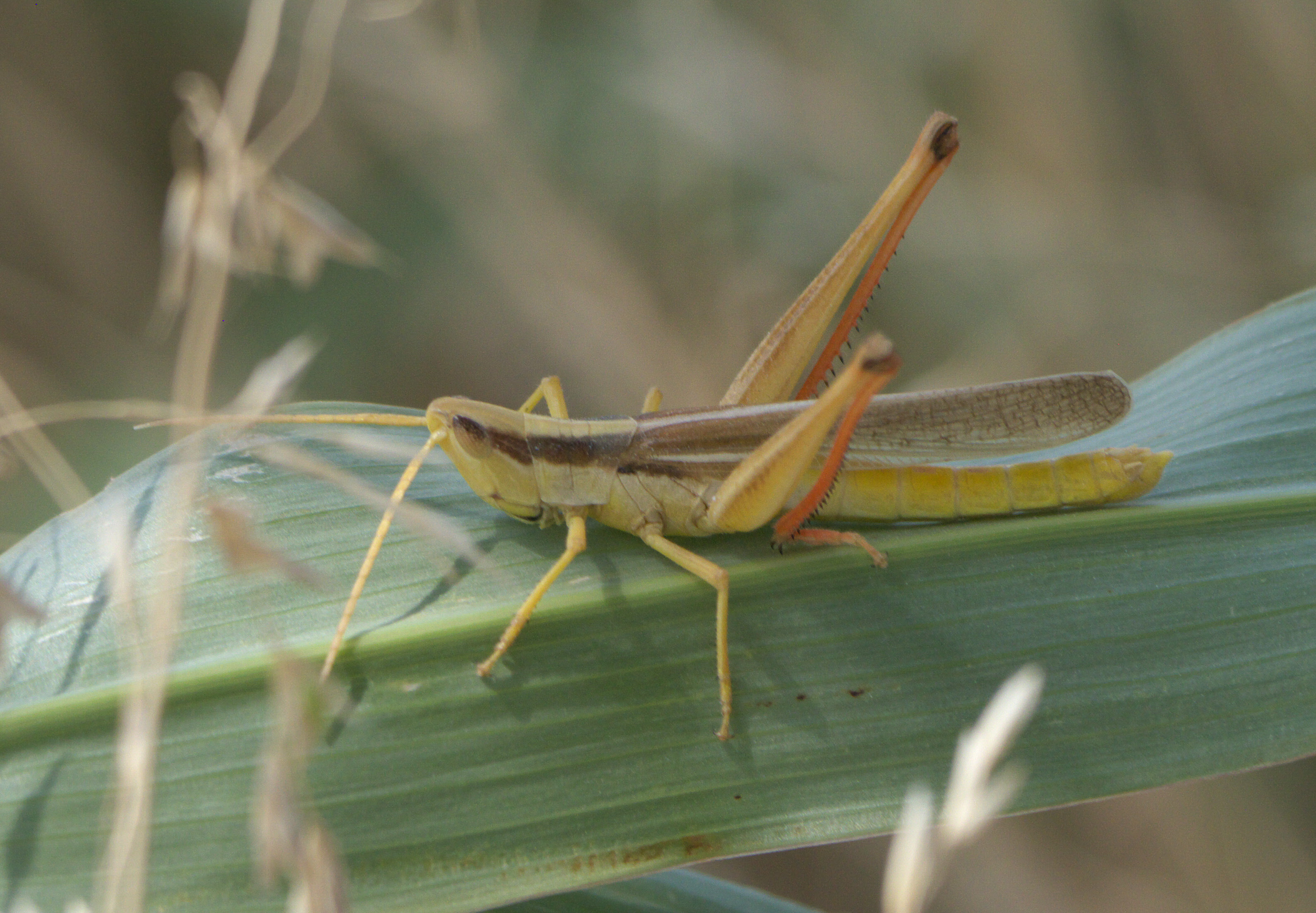

Scientific classification
- Kingdom: Animalia
- Phylum: Arthropoda
- Clade: Pancrustacea
- Class: Insecta
- Order: Orthoptera
- Suborder: Caelifera
- Family: Acrididae
- Subfamily: Gomphocerinae
- Tribe: Mermiriini
- Genus: Mermiria; Stål, 1873

= Mermiria =

Genus of grasshoppers

Mermiria is a genus of slant-faced grasshoppers in the family Acrididae. There are at least four described species in Mermiria.

== Species ==
These four species belong to the genus Mermiria:

- Mermiria bivittata (Serville, 1839) (two-striped mermiria)
- Mermiria intertexta Scudder, 1899 (eastern mermiria)
- Mermiria picta (F. Walker, 1870) (lively mermiria)
- Mermiria texana Bruner, 1889 (Texas mermiria)
