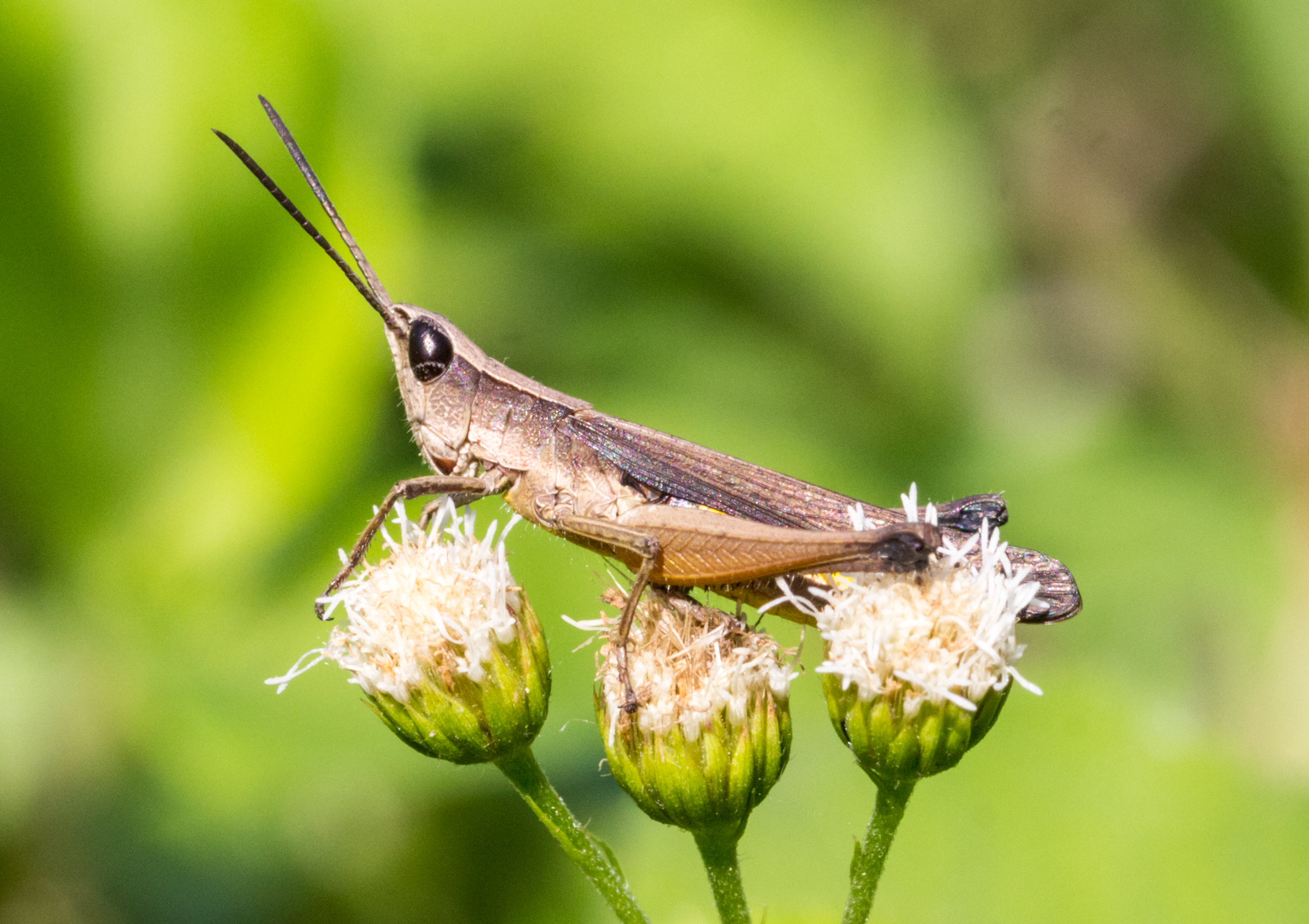
- Phlaeoba sp.

Scientific classification
- Kingdom: Animalia
- Phylum: Arthropoda
- Clade: Pancrustacea
- Class: Insecta
- Order: Orthoptera
- Suborder: Caelifera
- Superfamily: Acridoidea
- Family: Acrididae
- Subfamily: Acridinae
- Tribe: Phlaeobini
- Genus: Phlaeoba; Stål, 1861

Synonyms
- Kirbyella Bolívar, 1909; Phleoba Bolívar, 1890; Phloeoba Walker, 1870; Ybrika Bolívar, 1916

= Phlaeoba =

Genus of grasshoppers

Phlaeoba is a genus of grasshoppers in the family Acrididae and subfamily Acridinae. The recorded distribution of species includes: India, China, Indo-China and Malesia.

== Species ==
The Orthoptera Species File lists:

1. Phlaeoba abbreviata Willemse, 1931
2. Phlaeoba aberrans Willemse, 1937
3. Phlaeoba albonema Zheng, 1981
4. Phlaeoba angustidorsis Bolívar, 1902
5. Phlaeoba antennata Brunner von Wattenwyl, 1893
6. Phlaeoba assama Ramme, 1941
7. Phlaeoba brachyptera Caudell, 1921
8. Phlaeoba formosana (Shiraki, 1910)
9. Phlaeoba fumida (Walker, 1870)
10. Phlaeoba fumosa (Serville, 1838) - type species (as Gomphocerus rusticus Stål)
11. Phlaeoba galeata (Walker, 1870)
12. Phlaeoba horvathi Kuthy, 1911
13. Phlaeoba infumata Brunner von Wattenwyl, 1893
14. Phlaeoba jiuwanshanensis Zheng & Deng, 2006
15. Phlaeoba matsumurai (Bolívar, 1914)
16. Phlaeoba medogensis Liu, 1981
17. Phlaeoba nantouensis Ye & Yin, 2007
18. Phlaeoba panteli Bolívar, 1902
19. Phlaeoba ramakrishnai Bolívar, 1914
20. Phlaeoba rotundata Uvarov, 1929
21. Phlaeoba sikkimensis Ramme, 1941
22. Phlaeoba sinensis Bolívar, 1914
23. Phlaeoba tenebrosa (Walker, 1871)
24. Phlaeoba unicolor Bolívar, 1914
