= Calephorini =

Scientific classification
- Kingdom: Animalia
- Phylum: Arthropoda
- Clade: Pancrustacea
- Class: Insecta
- Order: Orthoptera
- Suborder: Caelifera
- Family: Acrididae
- Subfamily: Acridinae
- Tribe: Calephorini; X. Yin, 1982

Genera
- Calephorus Fieber, 1854 (type)

Synonyms
- Calephori X. Yin, 1982; Calephorinae X. Yin, 1982

Tribe of grasshoppers

Calephorini is a tribe of insects in the subfamily Acridinae, the silent slant-faced grasshoppers.
