= Vitalisia alternata =

Scientific classification
- Kingdom: Animalia
- Phylum: Arthropoda
- Class: Insecta
- Order: Coleoptera
- Suborder: Polyphaga
- Infraorder: Cucujiformia
- Family: Cerambycidae
- Genus: Vitalisia (beetle)
- Species: V. alternata

Binomial name
- Vitalisia alternata (Fairmaire, 1895)

Synonyms
- Zotale alternata Fairmaire, 1895; Zotale spinosa Pic, 1924

Species of beetle

Vitalisia alternata is a species of beetle in the family Cerambycidae. It was described by Fairmaire in 1895. It is known from Laos and Vietnam.
