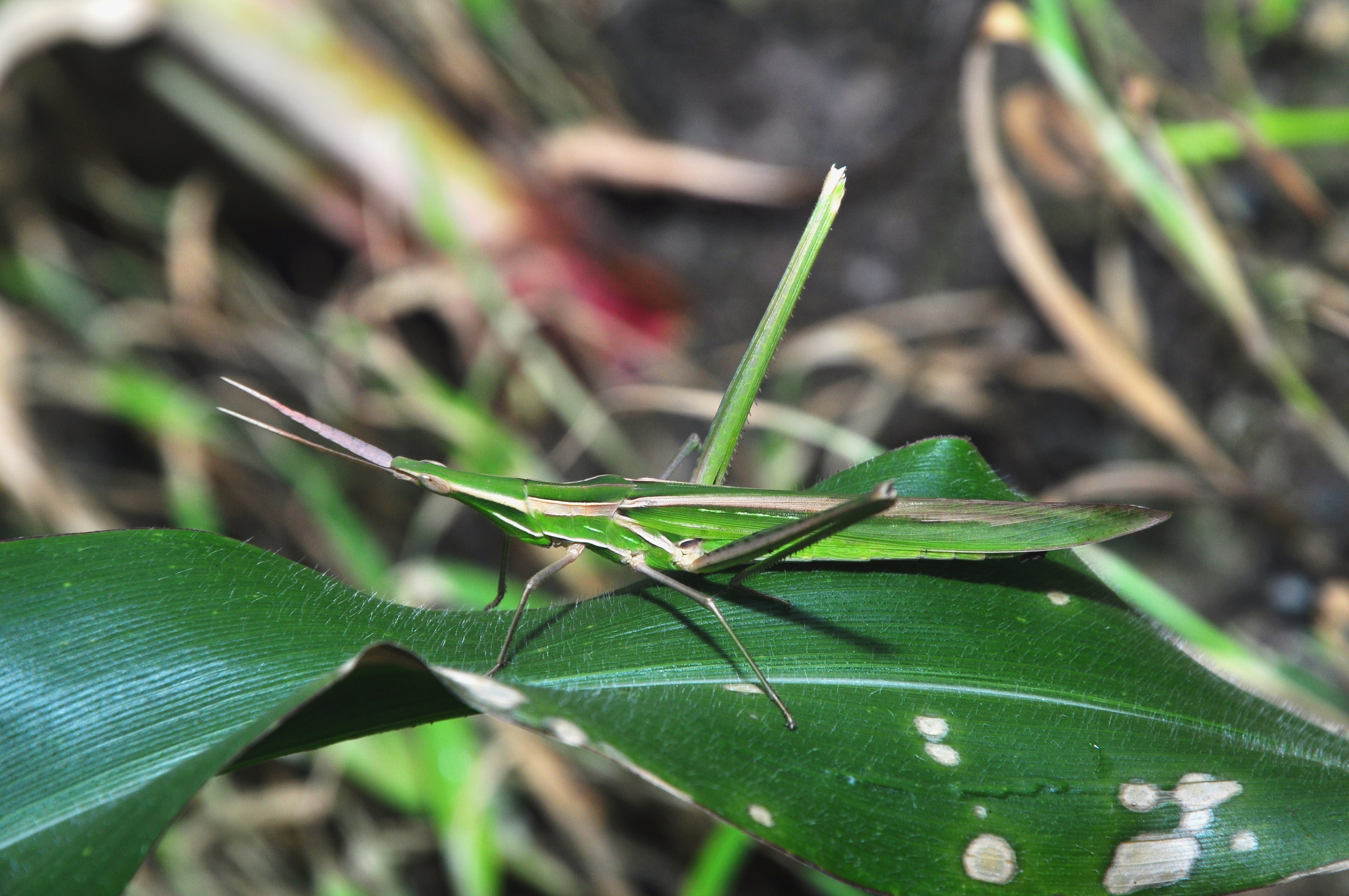
- Acrida sp.
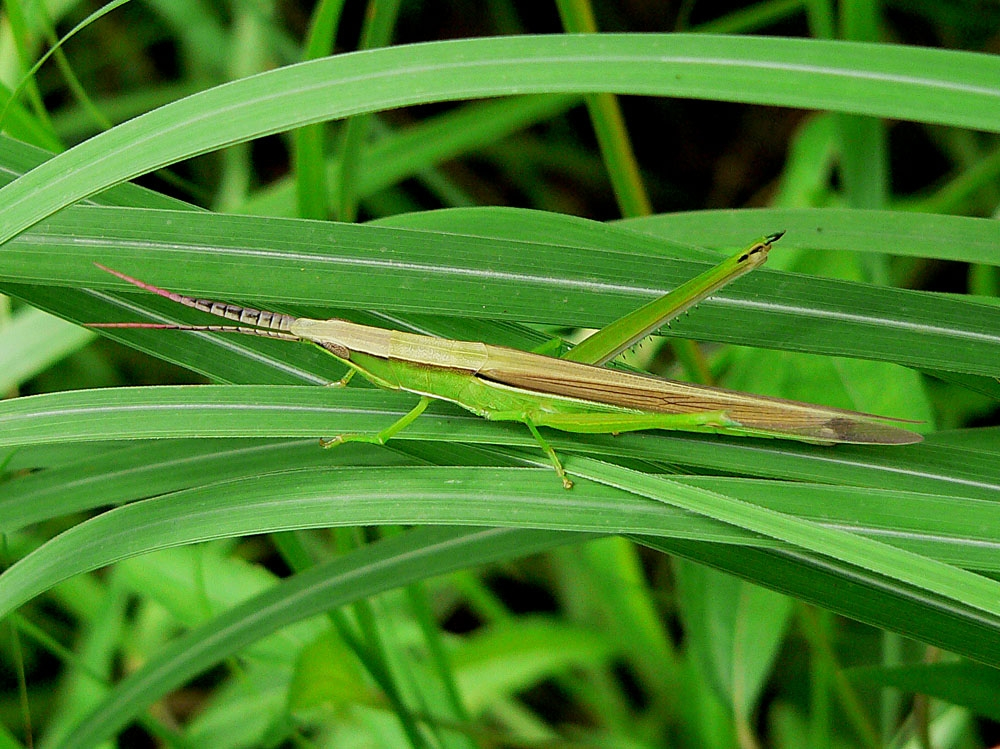
- Oxyolena mucronata female

Scientific classification
- Kingdom: Animalia
- Phylum: Arthropoda
- Clade: Pancrustacea
- Class: Insecta
- Order: Orthoptera
- Suborder: Caelifera
- Family: Acrididae
- Subfamily: Acridinae; Macleay, 1819

Tribes
- See text

= Acridinae =

Subfamily of grasshoppers

The grasshopper subfamily Acridinae, sometimes called silent slant-faced grasshoppers, belong of the large family Acrididae in the Orthoptera: Caelifera.

== Description ==
In appearance, the species are often similar to those of the subfamily Gomphocerinae, with whom they share a slanted face. However Acridinae differ from Gomphocerinae in that they lack stridulatory pegs on their hind legs and thus, as the common name suggests, do not make sounds. The antennae of this species is flattened and sword-like, a trait also shared with some gomphocerines and also with the spurthroated grasshoppers (subfamily Cyrtacanthacridinae). They lack the posternal spine seen in the spurthroated grasshoppers and lubber grasshoppers (subfamily Romaleinae). Hind wings in this species range from nearly colorless to colorless.

== Tribes and genera ==
The Orthoptera Species File lists the following:

=== Acridini ===
Auth.: MacLeay, 1821; distribution: widespread in warmer parts of the Old World & Australasia
(partial list):

- Acrida Linnaeus, 1758
- Acridarachnea Bolívar, I., 1908
- Caledia Bolívar, 1914
- Cryptobothrus Rehn, 1907
- Keshava (insect) Gupta & Chandra, 2017

=== Calephorini ===
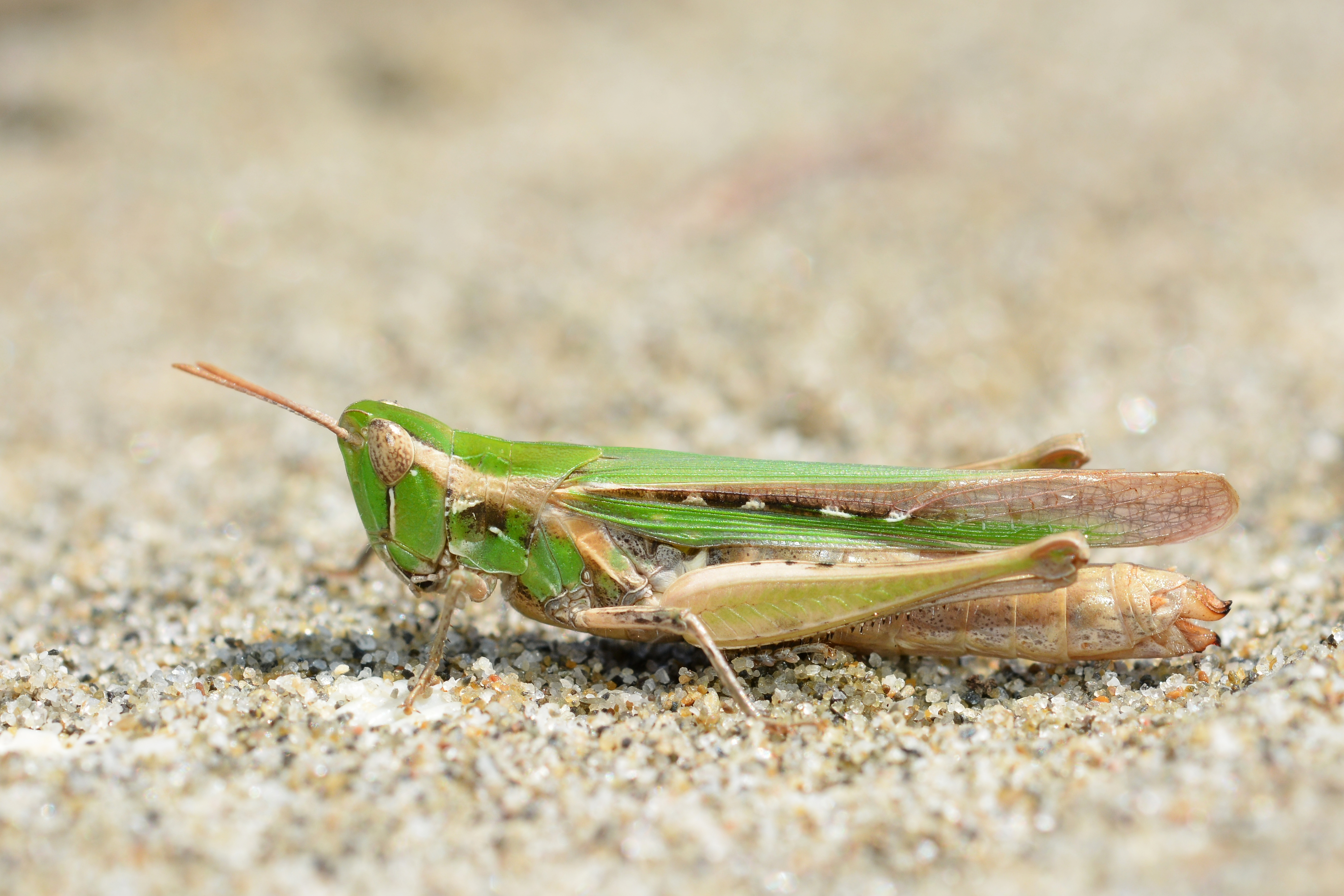
Calephorus compressicornis

Auth.: Yin, 1982; distribution: Africa, Europe, Indo-China; single genus:

- Calephorus Fieber, 1853

=== Gymnobothrini ===
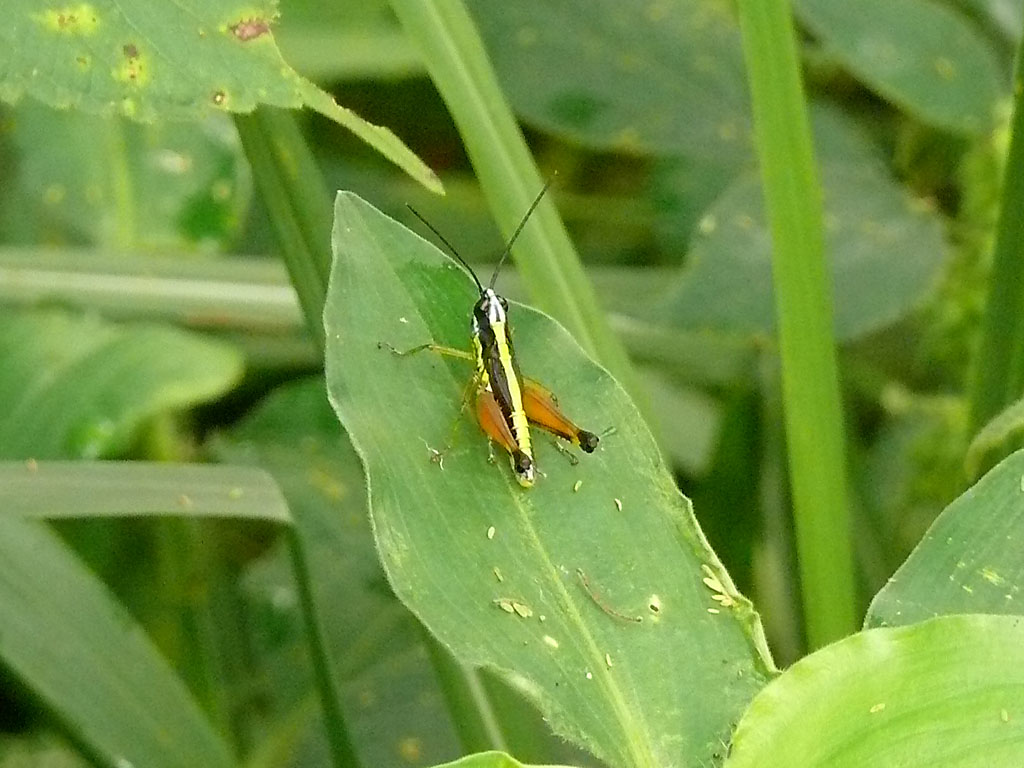
Zacompsa pedestris

Auth.: Uvarov, 1953 - Africa

1. Brachybothrus Popov, 2019
2. Chirista Karsch, 1893
3. Comacris Bolívar, 1890
4. Coryphosima Karsch, 1893
5. Guichardippus Dirsh, 1959
6. Gymnobothrus Bolívar, 1889
7. Hulstaertia Ramme, 1931
8. Keya (insect) Uvarov, 1941
9. Malcolmburria Uvarov, 1953
10. Oxybothrus Uvarov, 1953
11. Rastafaria Ramme, 1931
12. Roduniella Bolívar, 1914
13. Tenuihippus Willemse, 1994
14. Zacompsa Karsch, 1893

=== Hyalopterygini ===
Auth.: Brunner von Wattenwyl, 1893; distribution: Americas

1. Allotruxalis Rehn, 1944
2. Cocytotettix Rehn, 1906
3. Eutryxalis Bruner, 1900
4. Guaranacris Rehn, 1944
5. Hyalopteryx Charpentier, 1845
6. Metaleptea Brunner von Wattenwyl, 1893
7. Neorphula Donato, 2004
8. Orphula Stål, 1873
9. Parorphula Bruner, 1900
10. Paulacris Rehn, 1944

=== Pargaini ===
Auth.: Uvarov, 1953 - Africa

1. Acteana Karsch, 1896
2. Machaeridia Stål, 1873
3. Odontomelus Bolívar, 1890
4. Parga (insect) Walker, 1870
5. Phryganomelus Jago, 1983

=== Phlaeobini ===
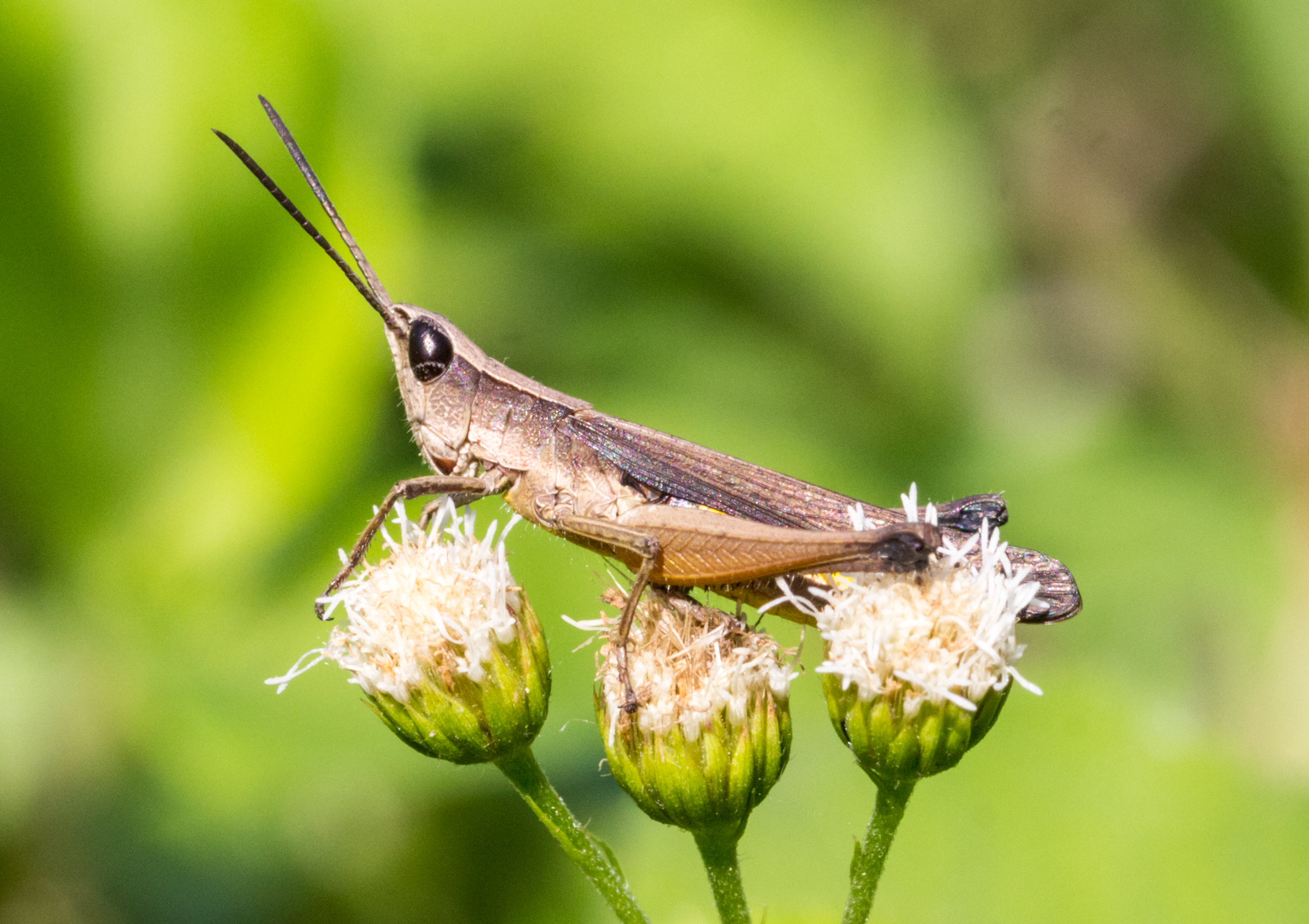
Phlaeoba sp.

Auth.: Brunner von Wattenwyl, 1893 - Africa, Middle East, Asia

- genus group Afrophlaeoba Jago, 1983
1. Afrophlaeoba Jago, 1983
2. Brachyphlaeobella Jago, 1983
3. Chlorophlaeobella Jago, 1983
4. Chokwea Uvarov, 1953
5. Chromochokwea Jago, 1983
6. Paralobopoma Rehn, 1914
7. Parodontomelus Ramme, 1929
8. Platyverticula Jago, 1983
- genus group Duronia Stål, 1876
1. Duronia Stål, 1876
2. Duroniella Bolívar, 1908
3. Leopardia Baccetti, 1985
4. Oxyduronia Popov, 2019
- genus group Ocnocerus Bolívar, 1889
1. Anacteana Popov, 2019
2. Hyperocnocerus Uvarov, 1953
3. Ocnocerus Bolívar, 1889
4. Panzia Miller, 1929
5. Rhabdoplea Karsch, 1893
6. Sumba (grasshopper) Bolívar, 1909
- genus group not determined:
1. Calliphlaeoba Ramme, 1941
2. Cannula Bolívar, 1906
3. Chlorophlaeoba Ramme, 1941
4. Culmulus Uvarov, 1953
5. Glyphoclonus Karsch, 1896
6. Holopercna Karsch, 1891
7. Mesophlaeoba Kumar & Usmani, 2015
8. Oxyphlaeoba Ramme, 1941
9. Oxyphlaeobella Ramme, 1941
10. Paraphlaeoba Bolívar, 1902
11. Phlaeoba Stål, 1861
12. Phlaeobacris Willemse, 1932
13. Phlaeobella Ramme, 1941
14. Phlaeobida Bolívar, 1902
15. Pseudophlaeoba Bolívar, 1914
16. Pyrgophlaeoba Miller, 1929
17. Sikkimiana Uvarov, 1940
18. Sinophlaeoba Niu & Zheng, 2005
19. Sinophlaeobida Yin & Yin, 2007
20. Xerophlaeoba Uvarov, 1936
21. Zygophlaeoba Bolívar, 1902

=== Truxalini ===
Auth.: Serville, 1838

1. Acridarachnea - monotypic A. ophthalmica Bolívar, 1908
2. Chromotruxalis Dirsh, 1950
3. Oxytruxalis Dirsh, 1950
4. Truxalis Fabricius, 1775
5. Truxaloides Dirsh, 1950
6. Xenotruxalis Dirsh, 1950 - monotypic X. fenestrata (Ramme, 1929)

=== Genera incertae sedis ===
1. Aeropedelloides Liu, 1981
2. Anaeolopus Uvarov, 1922
3. Bababuddinia Bolívar, 1917
4. Bambesiana Koçak & Kemal, 2008
5. Brachyacrida Dirsh, 1952
6. Calliphlaeoba Ramme, 1941
7. Capulica Bolívar, 1917
8. Carinacris Liu, 1984
9. Carliola Uvarov, 1939
10. Chromacrida Dirsh, 1952
11. Closteridea Scudder, 1893
12. Cohembia Uvarov, 1953
13. Conuacris Willemse, 1932
14. Covasacris Liebermann, 1970
15. Dorsthippus Donskoff, 1977
16. Duroniopsis Bolívar, 1914
17. Eoscyllina Rehn, 1909
18. Epacromiacris Willemse, 1933
19. Euprepoptera Uvarov, 1953
20. Euthynous Stål, 1877
21. Julea Bolívar, 1914
22. Kaloa (insect) Bolívar, 1909
23. Lemuracris Dirsh, 1966
24. Lobopoma Karsch, 1896
25. Luzonica Willemse, 1933
26. Megaphlaeoba Willemse, 1951
27. Neophlaeoba Usmani & Shafee, 1983
28. Nimbacris Popov & Fishpool, 1992
29. Nivisacris Liu, 1984
30. Orthochtha Karsch, 1891
31. Oxyolena Karsch, 1893
32. Oxyphlaeoba Ramme, 1941
33. Palawanacris Ramme, 1941
34. Pamacris Ramme, 1929
35. Paracoryphosima Descamps & Wintrebert, 1966
36. Paraduronia Bolívar, 1909
37. Paraphlaeoba Bolívar, 1902
38. Paraphlaeobida Willemse, 1951
39. Pasiphimus Bolívar, 1914
40. Perella (insect) Bolívar, 1914
41. Phlocerus Fischer von Waldheim, 1833
42. Phorinia (insect) Bolívar, 1914
43. Plagiacris Sjöstedt, 1931
44. Pseudoeoscyllina Liang & Jia, 1992
45. Pseudopargaella Descamps & Wintrebert, 1966
46. Pseudoptygonotus Zheng, 1977
47. Ruganotus Yin, 1979
48. Rugophlaeoba Willemse, 1951
49. Shabacris Popov & Fishpool, 1992
50. Sherifuria Uvarov, 1926
51. Urugalla Uvarov, 1927
52. Vietteacris Descamps & Wintrebert, 1966
53. Vitalisia Bolívar, 1914
54. Weenenia Miller, 1932
55. Wellawaya (insect) Uvarov, 1927
56. Xenocymochtha Popov & Fishpool, 1992
57. Xenoderus Uvarov, 1925
58. Yendia Ramme, 1929
59. Zambiacris Johnsen, 1983
60. Zygophlaeoba Bolívar, 1902

=== Genera sometimes or formerly placed here ===
- Achurum and Mermiria (otherwise in Gomphocerinae)
- Gastrimargus (otherwise in Oedipodinae).
- the tribe Parapleurini (containing Stethophyma) is now placed in Oedipodinae.
