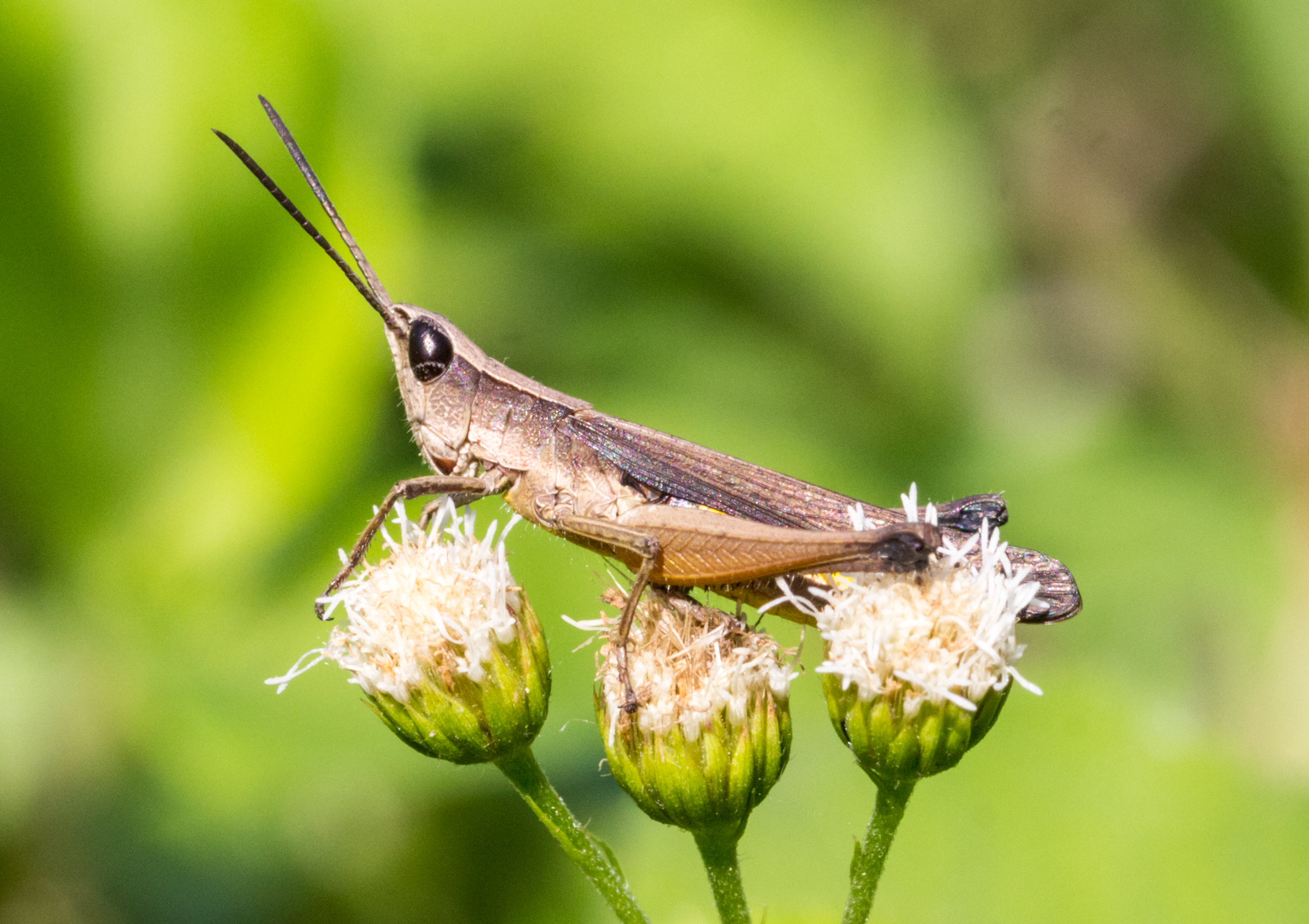
- Phlaeoba sp.

Scientific classification
- Kingdom: Animalia
- Phylum: Arthropoda
- Clade: Pancrustacea
- Class: Insecta
- Order: Orthoptera
- Suborder: Caelifera
- Family: Acrididae
- Subfamily: Acridinae
- Tribe: Phlaeobini; Brunner von Wattenwyl, 1893

Synonyms
- Phlaeobae Brunner von Wattenwyl, 1893; Phlaeobinae Brunner von Wattenwyl, 1893

= Phlaeobini =

Tribe of grasshoppers

The Phlaeobini are a tribe of grasshoppers in the subfamily Acridinae. The recorded distribution of genera includes: Africa, the Middle East and Asia.

== Genera ==
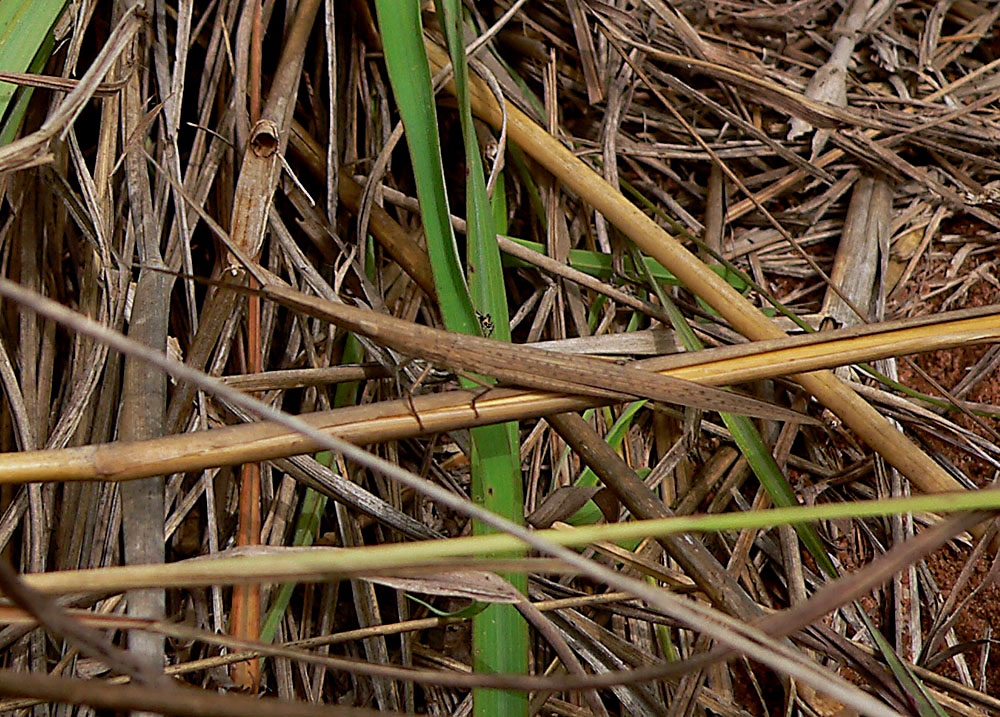
Cannula gracilis

The Orthoptera Species File lists:

Genus group Afrophlaeoba

1. Afrophlaeoba Jago, 1983
2. Brachyphlaeobella Jago, 1983
3. Chlorophlaeobella Jago, 1983
4. Chokwea Uvarov, 1953
5. Chromochokwea Jago, 1983
6. Paralobopoma Rehn, 1914
7. Parodontomelus Ramme, 1929
8. Platyverticula Jago, 1983

Genus group Duronia

1. Duronia (insect) Stål, 1876
2. Duroniella Bolívar, 1908
3. Leopardia Baccetti, 1985 - monotypic L. bivittata Baccetti, 1985
4. Oxyduronia Popov, 2019

Genus group Ocnocerus

1. Anacteana Popov, 2019
2. Hyperocnocerus Uvarov, 1953
3. Ocnocerus Bolívar, 1889
4. Panzia Miller, 1929
5. Rhabdoplea Karsch, 1893
6. Sumba (insect) Bolívar, 1909

Genus group not placed

1. Cannula Bolívar, 1906
2. Chlorophlaeoba Ramme, 1941
3. Culmulus Uvarov, 1953
4. Glyphoclonus Karsch, 1896
5. Holopercna Karsch, 1891
6. Mesophlaeoba Kumar & Usmani, 2015
7. Oxyphlaeobella Ramme, 1941
8. Phlaeoba Stål, 1861
9. Phlaeobacris Willemse, 1932
10. Phlaeobella Ramme, 1941
11. Phlaeobida Bolívar, 1902
12. Pseudophlaeoba Bolívar, 1914
13. Pyrgophlaeoba Miller, 1929
14. Sikkimiana Uvarov, 1940
15. Sinophlaeoba Niu & Zheng, 2005
16. Sinophlaeobida Yin & Yin, 2007
17. Xerophlaeoba Uvarov, 1936
