= Willy Adolf Theodor Ramme =

German entomologist (1887–1953)

Willy Adolf Theodor Ramme (28 February 1887 – 24 August 1953) was a German entomologist. Ramme was born in Berlin and was a Curator in the Berlin's Natural History Museum. He specialised in Orthoptera.

== Works ==
Partial list

- 1921 Orthopterologische Beiträge. Archiv für Naturgeschichte Abt. A, 86(12): 81-166.
- 1928 Orthoptera palaearctica critica. V. Ein neues Genus der Euprepocnemini (Acrid.). Eos , Madrid, 4 : 113-116, 1 fig., pl. 2.
- 1929 Afrikanische Acrididae. Revisionen und Beschreibungen wenig bekannter und neuer Gattungen und Arten. Mitteilungen aus dem zoologischen Museum in Berlin, 15 : 247-492, pl. 2 à 16.
- 1930 Ein neuer Anthermus von Tanganyika ( Orth. Acrid.). Mitteilungen aus dem zoologischen Museum in Berlin, 16 (4) : 671-672, fig.
- 1931 Ergänzungen und Berichtigungen zu meiner Arbeit "Afrikanische Acrididae" (Orth.). Mitteilungen aus dem zoologischen Museum in Berlin, 16 (6) : 918-945.
- 1931 Beiträge zur Kenntnis der palaearktischen Orthopterenfauna (Tettig. et Acrid.). Mitteilungen aus dem Zoologischen Museum in Berlin 17: 165-200.
- 1941 Die Orthopterenfauna von Kärnten. Carinthia II 131./51.: 121–131.
- 1951 Zur Systematik, Faunistik und Biologie der Orthopteren von Südosteuropa und Vorderasien. Mitteilungen Zoolog. Museum Berlin 27, 431 pp + Tafeln.
