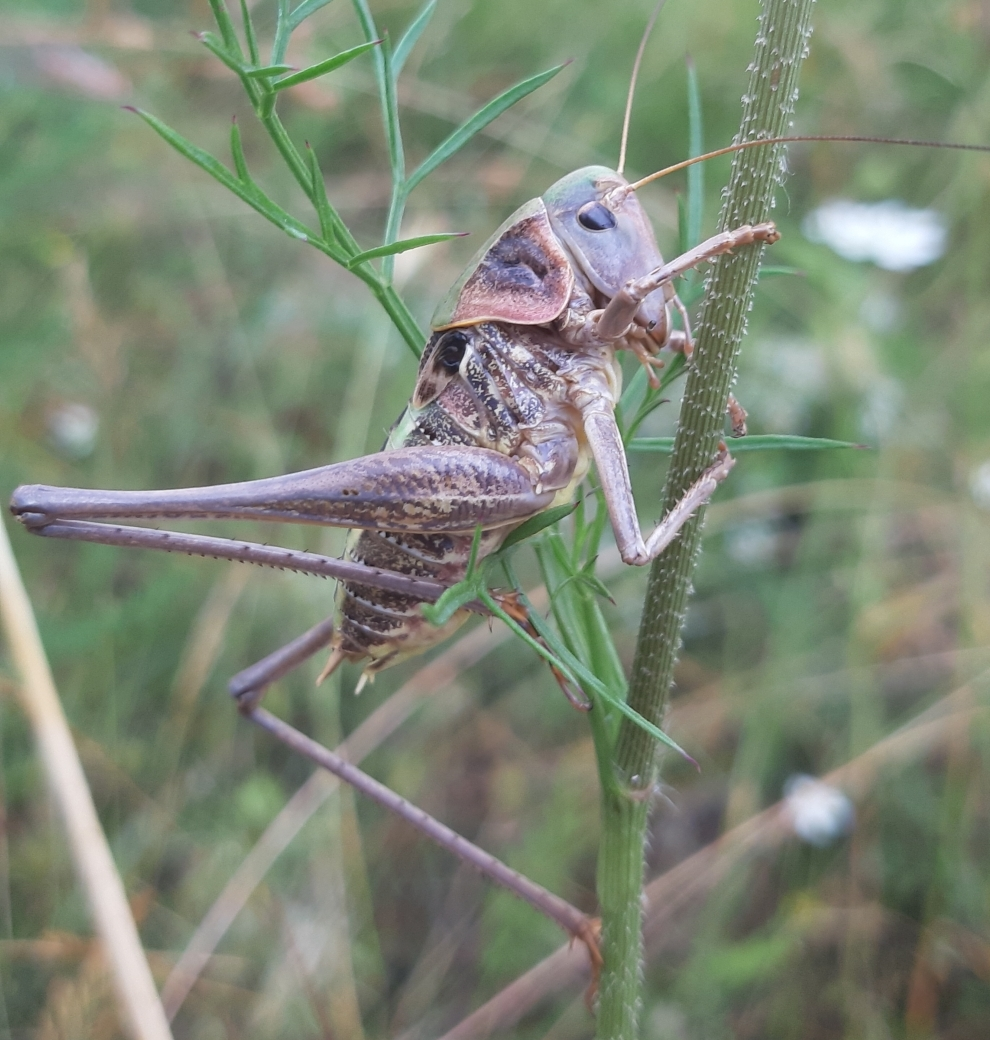

Conservation status
- Vulnerable (IUCN 3.1)

Scientific classification
- Kingdom: Animalia
- Phylum: Arthropoda
- Class: Insecta
- Order: Orthoptera
- Suborder: Ensifera
- Family: Tettigoniidae
- Genus: Decticus
- Species: D. loudoni

Binomial name
- Decticus loudoni Ramme, 1933
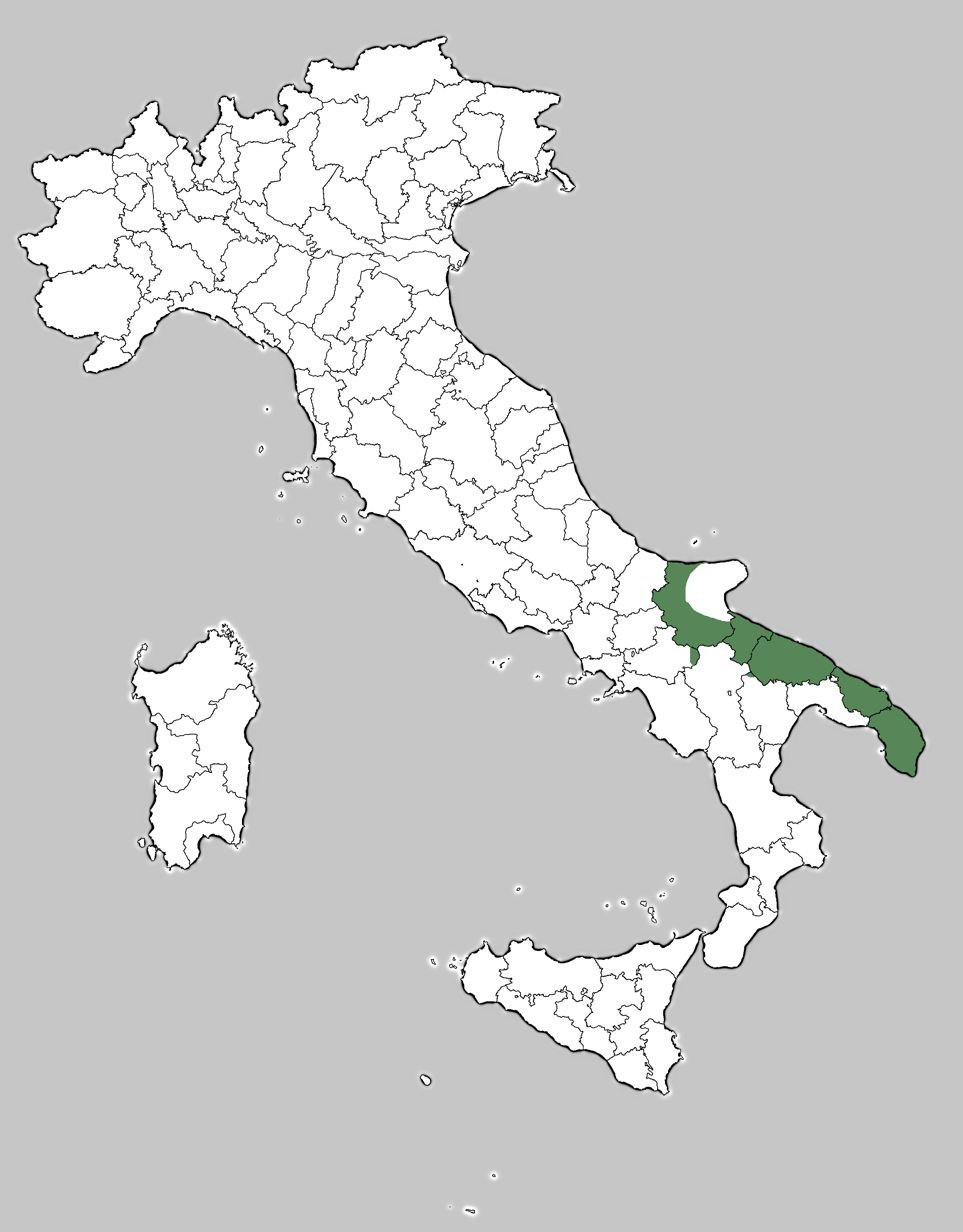

Synonyms
- Locusta verrucivora Costa G., 1871; Decticus verrucivorus loudoni Götz, 1970

= Decticus loudoni =

Apulian wart-biter

Species of bush-cricket

Decticus loudoni, the Apulian wart-biter, is a species of wart-biter bush cricket endemic to the south east of Italy, mainly in Apulia. It is vulnerable to extinction.

== Distribution and habitat ==
The type locality of D. loudoni is Spongano, Apulia, Italy. The male holotype specimen is now held in the Museum für Naturkunde (MfN). D. loudoni is now understood to inhabit the southeastern portion of the Italian peninsula: throughout Salento (the "heel" of Italy) and further north in Foggia, both in Apulia. It is also found in the adjacent eastern fringe of Campania. They are particularly abundant in Alta Murgia National Park.

Apulian wart biters are inhabitants of hot, dry, semi-natural habitats: shrubland, grassland, pastures, and meadows stony and hilly. They are found in habitats between 70 and 250 m in elevation, while the related Decticus aprutianus is found nearby but in higher terrain, usually no lower than 1200 m. The vegetation in their typical habitat is lightly grazed grass and dispersed occasional shrubs. The wart-biters are typical of Murge plateau orthopterans.

== Conservation ==
Decticus loudoni is considered a Vulnerable species in the IUCN red list. They are threatened by human agricultural activity.
