= Kosher locust =

Insect considered kosher under Jewish dietary laws

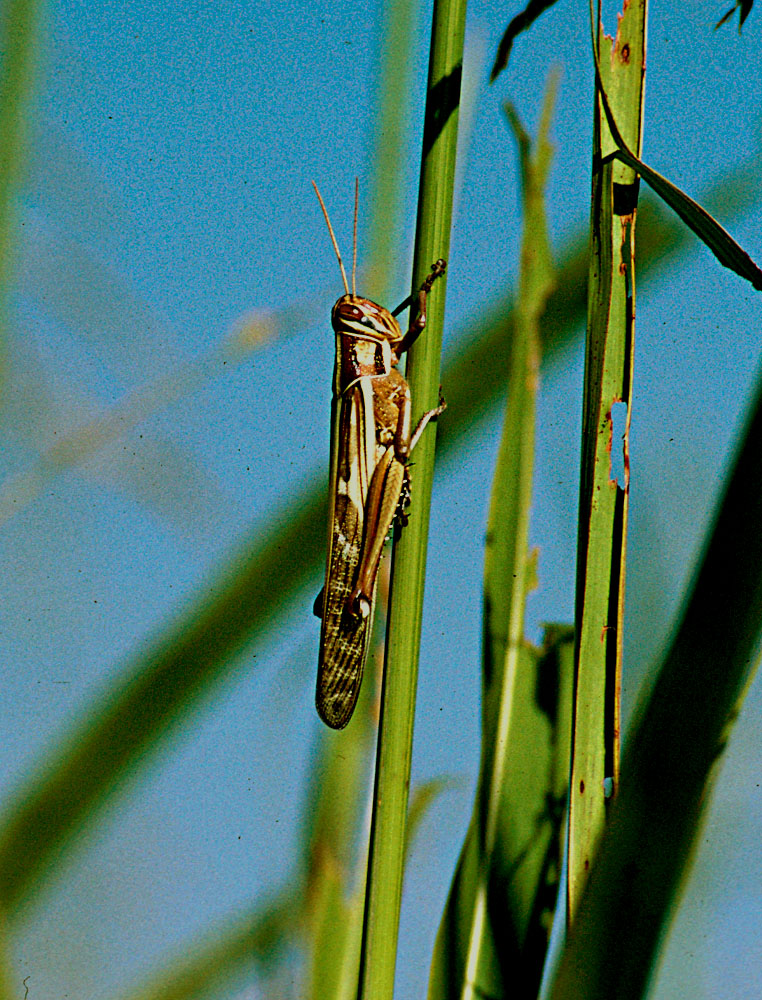
- A red locust

Halakhic texts relating to this article
- Torah: Leviticus 11:22
- Mishnah: Hullin 3:7
- Babylonian Talmud: Hullin 65a-66b and Avodah Zarah 37a
- Shulchan Aruch: Yoreh De'ah 85
- Other rabbinic codes: Exodus Rabbah 13:7

Kosher locusts are types of orthopterans deemed permissible for consumption under the laws of kashrut (Jewish dietary law). While the consumption of most insects is generally forbidden, Leviticus excepts four categories of flying insects (for that reason, the term "kosher locust" is somewhat of a misnomer). However, the identity of those species is in dispute. Before their emigration to Israel in the mid-20th century, the Jewish communities of Yemen and parts of northern Africa, ate certain species which they preserved a tradition to be kosher, and they continue to do so occasionally to this day.

== Biblical source ==
The general rule regarding flying insects is as follows:

All winged swarming things that go upon all fours are a detestable thing unto you.

However, an exception is made for four categories of flying insects:

Yet these may ye eat of all winged swarming things that go upon all fours, which have jointed legs above their feet, with which to leap upon the earth. These of them ye may eat: the arbeh after its kinds, and the salam after its kinds, and the hargol after its kinds, and the hagav after its kinds. But all winged swarming things, which have four feet, are a detestable thing unto you.

The identity of the four permitted types is difficult to ascertain. The terms used in the Bible refer to color and broad morphological generalities shared by many Middle-Eastern species. Using primarily color to identify insect species is a notoriously unreliable approach. Insects that come to adulthood will have slightly different colors based on season, diet, and prevailing climate.

== Rabbinic sources ==
=== Mishnah ===
The Mishnah provides criteria by which these species may be identified:

Among the grasshoppers (hagavim): all that have four legs, and four wings, and [two additional] jumping legs, and its wings cover most of its body [are permitted]. Rabbi Yosi says: and its name must be hagav.

Unlike the Bible (which permits certain named types of insect), this Mishnah lists physical characteristics – which are met by many species of grasshoppers, and every species of locust. However, Rabbi Yose's opinion is more restrictive: like the Bible, it requires a specific type name, not just physical characteristics.

=== Talmud ===
The Talmud elaborates that the four categories mentioned in the biblical text contain subcategories: the phrase "the arbeh after its kinds" implies at least two kinds under the category of arbeh, and similarly for the other three types. The Talmud translates the four biblical names with then-contemporary Aramaic, and lists the additional kinds as follows:

Biblical name	Aramaic translation	Additional kinds
arbeh	govai	tzipporet keramim
sol'am	rashon (or nippol)	ushkaf, yohana yerushalmit
hargol	nippol (or rashon)	karsephet, shahalanit, artzuvia
hagav	nadyan	razbanit

=== Post-Talmudic Authorities ===
Rabbi Yose's additional restriction is required by some rishonim. However, opinions differ on how it is to be understood. According to Tur, there must be a specific tradition that a particular insect is within the category of hagav. However, according to Maimonides, all that is needed is for the species to be referred to as a hagav or a translation of this term, such as "locust". Despite the general adherence of Yemenite Jews to the rulings of Maimonides, they were more stringent than Maimonides' opinion that merely recognizing a locust's features was sufficient to permit it. Rather, they ate only those locusts which they possessed a tradition of eating. It is unnecessary to have a "personal tradition" in order to eat locusts – one who travels to a place where the people do have a tradition may eat locusts there.

== Identification ==
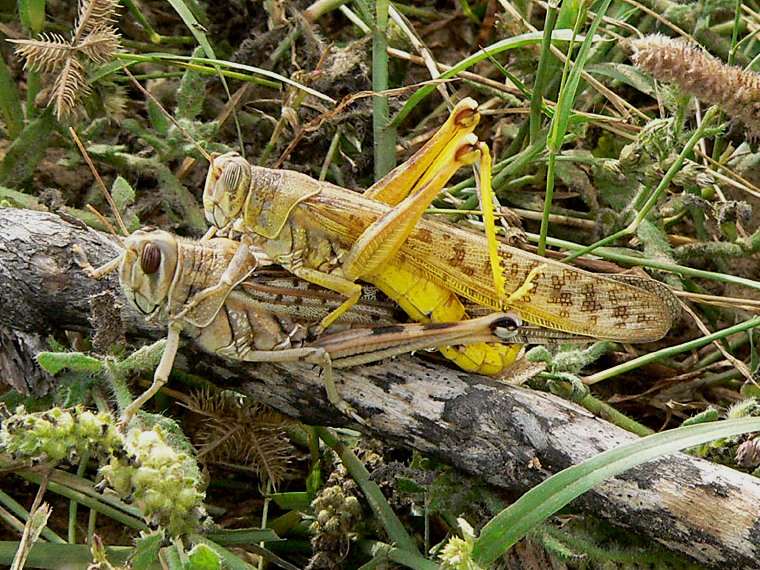
Pair of desert locusts (Schistocerca gregaria)

=== Arbeh ===
Among Yemenite Jews "continuous tradition" exists for 3 species: desert locust (Schistocerca gregaria), migratory locust (Locusta migratoria), and Egyptian locust (Anacridium aegyptium).

The most common locust consumed in both Yemen and Morocco was the desert locust (Schistocerca gregaria), whose color ranges from yellowish-green to grey, to reddish in colour when it reaches maturity. According to Prof. Zohar Amar, this was the only locust species for which the traditional identification is unquestionable, while for other species the reliability of local traditions is more speculative. Both the desert locust, and the less common migratory locust, are classified as arbeh. So too, presumably, is the Moroccan locust (Dociostaurus maroccanus), which may have been traditionally eaten by North African Jews.

According to Yemenite Jewish tradition, the edible locust referred to in the Torah is identified by the figure resembling the Hebrew letter chet (ח) on the underside of the thorax. Some explain that a distinguishing characteristic of kosher grasshoppers is that they sometimes swarm.

=== Sol'am & Hargol ===
The tradition of recognizing and eating hargol and sal'am was lost by Yemenite Jews (except Habbani Jews) prior to their migration to Israel in the mid-20th century. Amar speculates that sol'am might refer to the Acrida and Truxalis families, while hargol might refer to species in Tettigoniidae such as Decticus albifrons.

In 1911, Abraham Isaac Kook, the chief rabbi of Ottoman Palestine, addressed a question to the rabbinic Court at Sana'a concerning their custom of eating grasshoppers, and whether this custom was observed by observing their outward features, or by simply relying upon an oral tradition.

The reply given to him by the court was as follows: "The grasshoppers which are eaten by way of a tradition from our forefathers, which happen to be clean, are well-known unto us. But there are yet other species which have all the recognizable features of being clean, yet we do practice abstaining from them. [Appendage]: The clean grasshoppers (Hebrew: חגבים) about which we have a tradition are actually three species having each one different coloration [from the other], and each of them are called by us in the Arabian tongue, ğarād (locusts). But there are yet other species, about which we have no tradition, and we will not eat them. One of which is a little larger in size than the grasshoppers, having the name of `awsham. There is yet another variety, smaller in size than the grasshopper, and it is called ḥanājir (katydids)."

=== Hagav ===
The greyish or brownish Egyptian locust is thought by some to belong to the category of hagav, though other opinions identify it with tziporet hakeramim (a variation of arbeh). In Yemen it was known by the generic Arabic name al-Jarād (Arabic: الجراد), which generally referred to arbeh. However, the terms hagav in Hebrew and al-Jarād in Arabic could both be used as generic names for all kosher locusts, causing some confusion in terms of this species' classification. In Yemen, the locust and the grasshopper share the same Arabic name, although Jews in Yemen recognize the differences between the two. Apparently, the hagav category is similar in appearance to arbeh, except that it does not swarm.

== Ruling of ibn Attar based on Rashi ==
In the Jewish community of Djerba, the consumption of locusts was forbidden by a takkanah of Rabbi Aharon Perez in the mid-18th century. According to his letter to Rabbi David Eliyahu Hajaj, eating locusts was still an accepted practice in Tunisia at the time.

Although Perez was consumer of locusts himself, he quit the habit after reading Rabbi Chaim ibn Attar's book Peri To`ar, and moved in favor to prohibit consumption. Rashi explained that the term "jumping legs" in the Mishnah refers to legs that are adjacent to the locust's neck. However, no locust consumed in ibn Attar's time possesses such a body plan (instead, the jumping legs are located at the back of the animal), leading ibn Attar to conclude that the species being consumed were not the Torah's permitted locusts.

However, as the practice was still widely accepted in the city of Tunis—the rabbinical court of which was considered to have the higher authority—Perez kept his decision to himself without making it public. After the prohibition against eating locusts was finally declared in Tunis, Perez encouraged banning the practice in Djerba as well.

A variety of reasons have been advanced in opposition to ibn Attar's thesis, arguing that this comment of Rashi's should not be the basis for modern halacha. Among them:

- None of the thousands of species of grasshopper or locust known to zoologists possess the body plan suggested by Rashi's comment. According to Natan Slifkin, while it was reasonable for ibn Attar to conclude in the 18th century that the Torah referred to a different unknown species of locust, with more comprehensive modern zoology such a conclusion is untenable.
- In this commentary, Rashi intended to explain the words of the Biblical verse rather than to decide halacha, and indeed it would be inappropriate for a rabbi such as Rashi to have attempted to decide halacha based on his reading of Biblical verses, as ibn Attar understands Rashi to have done
- Rashi's opinion is a lone opinion contradicted by many other authorities
- Rashi himself seems to contradict this comment elsewhere.
- The Biblical verse, which states that the locust's jumping legs are "above" its walking legs, seems to mean that the jumping legs are further from the ground than the walking legs while the locust rests on the ground (as opposed to Rashi's interpretation that the jumping legs are closer to the neck, i.e. further up when the locust is held with its head up)
- The reference to the neck in Rashi's commentary may not even have been written by Rashi, but rather, added to manuscripts of his commentary by a later writer, as shown by comparison to other texts which quote Rashi's commentary but are missing these words

While ibn Attar writes that a rabbi he knew had discovered a locust whose jumping legs were next to the neck, the insect in question was almost certainly a mantis, whose front legs are large but are used for hunting not jumping, and which is universally considered not kosher.

Additionally, in Morocco, locusts were eaten into the 1900s. Only those who had a "continuous tradition" of both eating them and knowing the identifying sign of the kosher locusts would eat them.

== Yemenite Jews ==
Locusts were a well-established part of the cuisine of the Jews of Yemen prior to their immigration to Israel. Several methods were used to prepare locusts, prior to eating them. One popular way was to take the locusts and throw them into a pot of boiling salt water. After cooking for a few minutes, they were placed in a heated oven to dry them, or else spread out in the sun to dry. Once dried, the heads, wings and legs were removed, leaving only the thorax and abdomen for consumption.

Another method was to stoke an earthenware stove and, when fully heated, to cast them alive into the cavity of the stove. Once roasted, they were taken out and a brine solution was sprinkled over them, before spreading them out in the sun to dry, usually upon one's rooftop.

According to Avshalom Mizrahi, those with refined tastes saw it as a delicacy, whereas Yemenite rabbi Shlomo Korach claims that because locusts were eaten by poor Jews, they were not considered a delicacy.

It has been suggested that consuming locusts is permitted precisely because they destroy crops. Thus, if the locusts were to eat all one's crops, one could instead eat locusts and avoid starvation.

== In Israel today ==
Rabbis Herschel Shachter, Chaim Pinchas Scheinberg, and Yosef Qafih explicitly note that the consumption of kosher species of locusts is permitted.

Some such species can be bought in Israel for consumption. Hargol FoodTech sells its locusts and other food products fortified by locust protein under a special brand "Holy Locust".

In the 21st century, eating locusts from wild swarms is not recommended as they may be contaminated by insecticides used to control their numbers.

== See also ==
- Chapulines
- Entomophagy
- Nsenene

== Sources ==
- Abramowitz, Jack (3 November 2013), "158. Knee-High to a Grasshopper: The obligation to examine locusts for signs of being kosher", Orthodox Union, archived from the original on 9 April 2014
- Amar, Zohar (2002), "The Eating of Locusts in Jewish Tradition After the Talmudic Period" (PDF), The Torah U-Madda Journal, 11
- Amar, Zohar (2004), The Locust in Jewish Tradition (in Hebrew), Ramat-Gan: Bar-Ilan University, ISBN 965-226-257-9
- Valensi, Lucette; Udovitch, Abraham L. (1984), Juifs en terre d'Islam: les communautés de Djerba (in French), Éditions des archives contemporaines, ISBN 9782903928056
