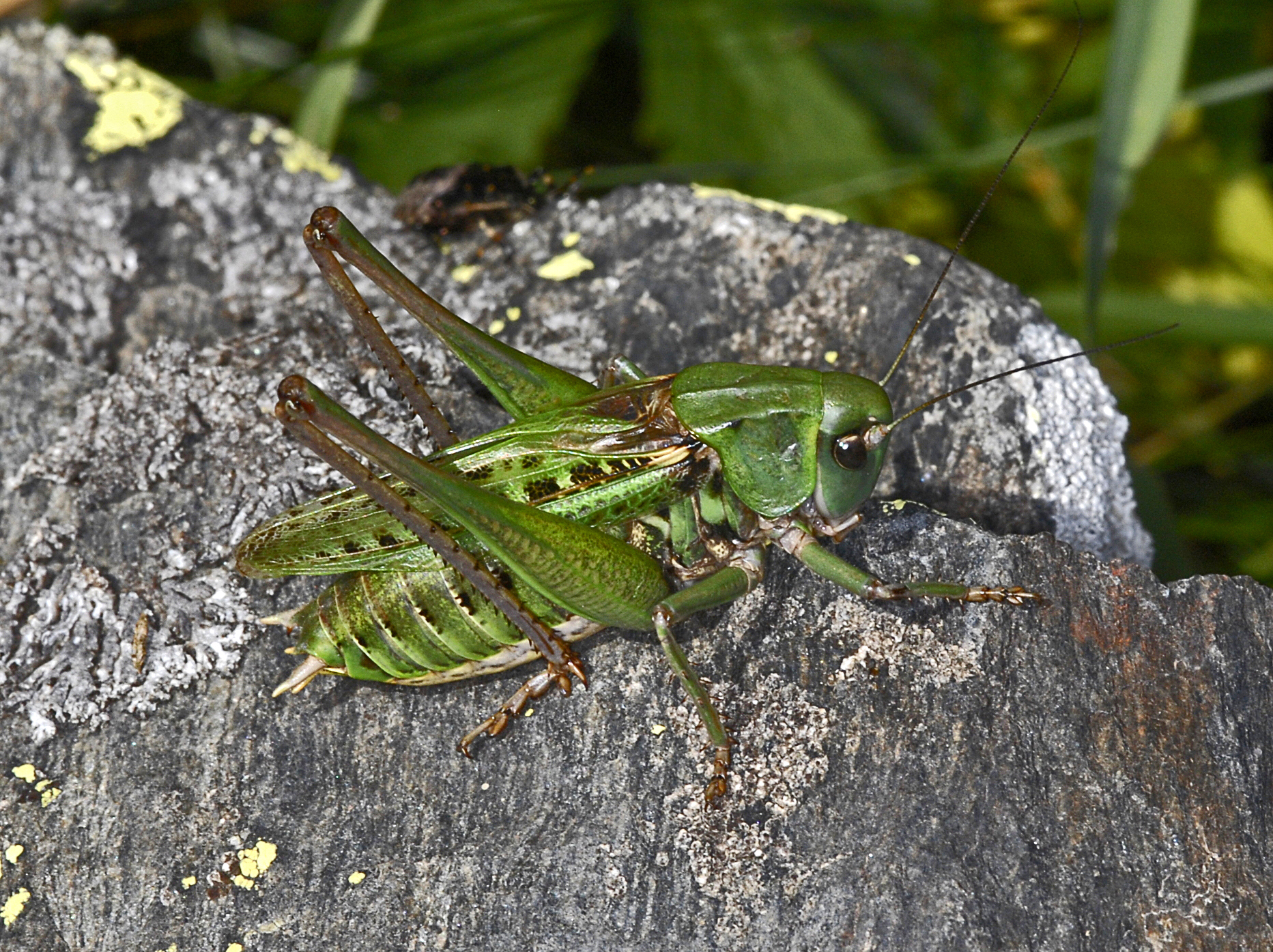
- Adult male of Decticus verrucivorus

Scientific classification
- Domain: Eukaryota
- Kingdom: Animalia
- Phylum: Arthropoda
- Class: Insecta
- Order: Orthoptera
- Suborder: Ensifera
- Family: Tettigoniidae
- Subfamily: Tettigoniinae
- Tribe: Decticini; Herman, 1874
- Genus: Decticus; Serville, 1831

= Decticus =

Genus of cricket-like animals

Decticus is the "wart-biter" genus of bush-crickets in the subfamily Tettigoniinae; it is the sole genus in the monotypic tribe Decticini Herman, 1874.

== Distribution ==
Species of this genus are present in Europe, in Asia and in North Africa.

== Species ==
The Orthoptera Species File lists:

1. Decticus albifrons (Fabricius, 1775)
2. Decticus annaelisae Ramme, 1929
3. Decticus hieroglyphicus Klug, 1832
4. Decticus loudoni Ramme, 1933
5. Decticus nigrescens Tarbinsky, 1930
6. Decticus verrucivorus (Linnaeus, 1758) - type species (D. verrucivorus verrucivorus)
