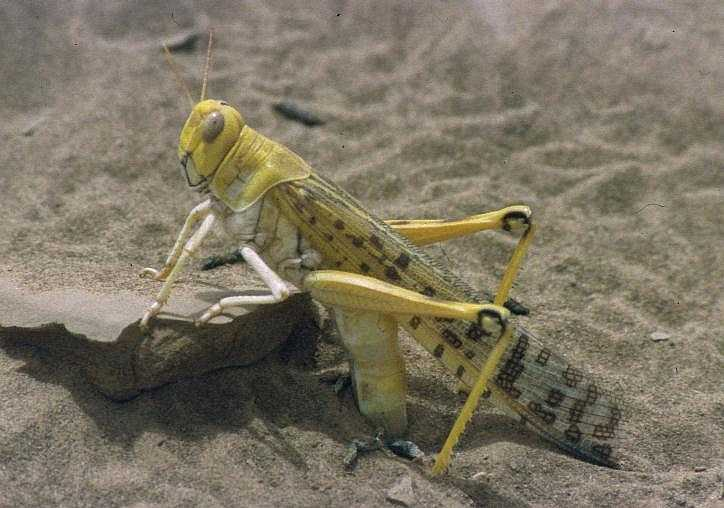
- A migratory phase adult laying eggs

Scientific classification
- Kingdom: Animalia
- Phylum: Arthropoda
- Clade: Pancrustacea
- Class: Insecta
- Order: Orthoptera
- Suborder: Caelifera
- Family: Acrididae
- Genus: Schistocerca
- Species: S. gregaria

Binomial name
- Schistocerca gregaria Forsskål, 1775

Synonyms
- Acridium peregrina Olivier, 1804; Gryllus rufescens Thunberg, 1815

= Desert locust =

Species of grasshopper

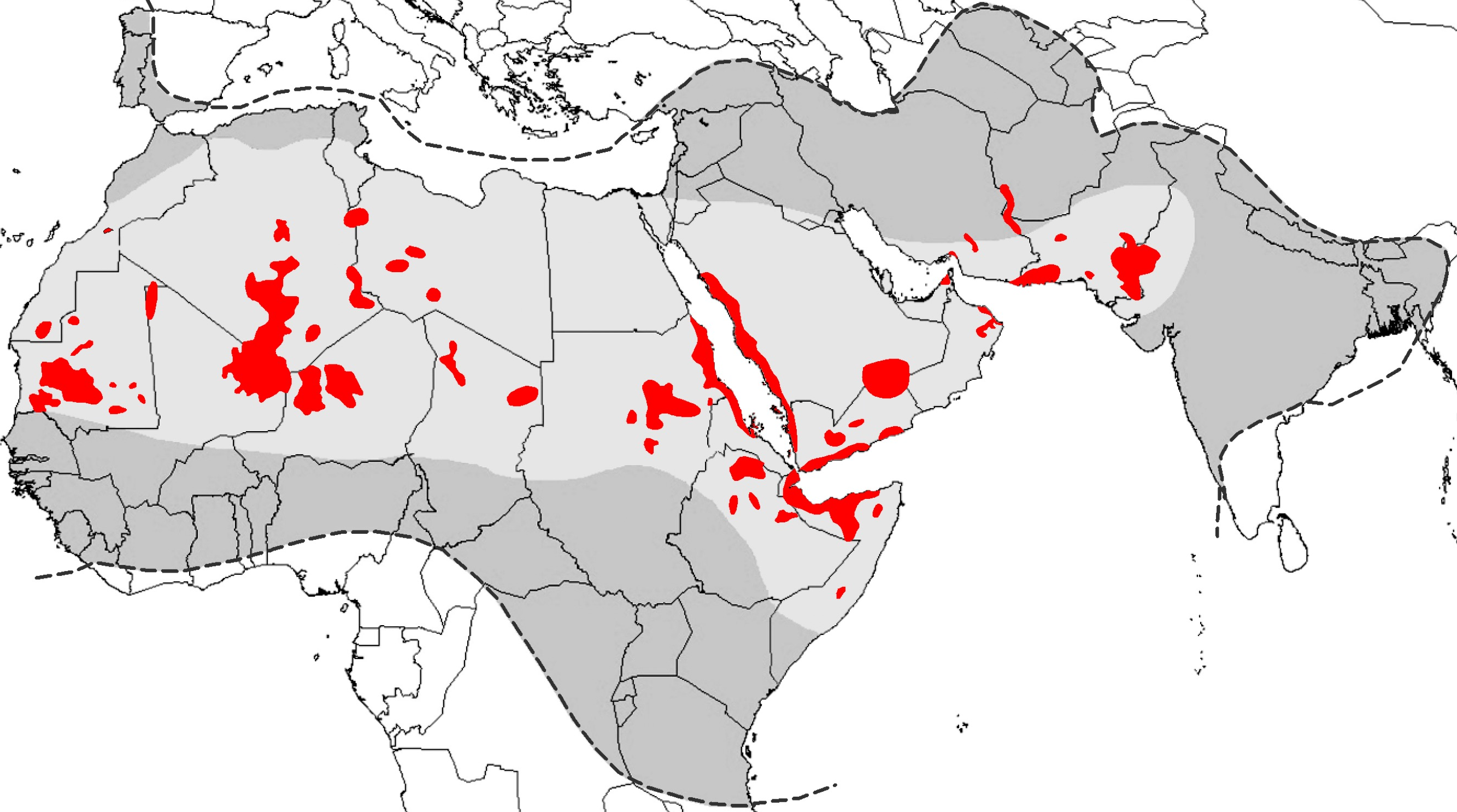
Desert locust main initial outbreak areas (modified from Lecoq, 2004 and Sword et al. 2010, the most recent outbreak occurred between June 2019 and February 2022.)In red, outbreak areas; light grey, recession area; light and dark grey together represent the invasion area (modified from Lecoq, 2004 and Sword et al. 2010).

The desert locust (Schistocerca gregaria) is a species of locust in the grasshopper family, Acrididae. A periodically swarming, short-horned bird grasshopper, it is found primarily in the deserts and dry areas of northern and eastern Africa, Arabia, and southwest Asia. During population surge years, its range may extend north into parts of Southern Europe, Eastern Africa, and Northern India. The desert locust shows periodic changes in its body form and can change in response to environmental conditions over several generations. It begins life as a solitary, shorter-winged, highly fecund (producing enormous amounts of offspring), non-migratory form, to a gregarious, long-winged, and migratory phase in which it may travel long distances into new areas. Due to this traveling, it may join groups, thus, forming locust plagues. This involves invading new areas where it may consume all vegetation including valuable crops. Although at other times, it may live unnoticed in small numbers in various areas.

During plague years, when the desert locust does group with others, it can cause widespread damage to crops as it is highly mobile and feeds on large quantities of any kind of green vegetation. A typical swarm can be made up of 150 million locusts per square kilometre (390,000,000 per square mile) and fly in the direction of the prevailing wind, up to 150 km (93 mi) in one day. Even a very small, 1-square-kilometre (0.39 sq mi) locust swarm can eat the same amount of food in a day as about 35,000 people.

As an international transboundary pest that threatens agricultural production and livelihoods in many countries in Africa, the Near East, and southwest Asia, its population has been routinely monitored through a collaborative effort between countries and the United Nations Food and Agriculture Organization (FAO) Desert Locust Information Service (DLIS), which provides global and national assessments, forecasts, and early warning to affected countries and the international community. The desert locust's migratory nature and capacity for rapid population growth present major challenges for control, particularly in remote semiarid areas, which characterize much of its range.

Locusts differ from other grasshoppers in their ability to change from a solitary living form into gregarious, highly mobile, adult swarms and hopper bands, as their numbers and densities increase. They exist in different states known as recessions (with low and intermediate numbers), rising to local outbreaks and regional upsurges with increasingly high densities, to plagues consisting of numerous swarms. They have two to five generations per year. The desert locust risk increases with a one-to-two-year continuum of favourable weather (greater frequency of rains) and habitats that support population increases leading to upsurges and plagues.

The desert locust is potentially the most dangerous of the locust pests because of the ability of swarms to fly rapidly across great distances. The major desert locust upsurge in 2004–05 caused significant crop losses in West Africa and diminished food security in the region. The 2019–2021 upsurge caused similar losses in northeast Africa, the Near East, and southwest Asia.

== Taxonomy ==
The desert locust is a species of orthopteran in the family Acrididae, subfamily Cyrtacanthacridinae. There are two subspecies, one called Schistocerca gregaria gregaria, the better known and of huge economic importance, located north of the equator, and the other, Schistocerca gregaria flaviventris, which has a smaller range in south-west Africa and is of less economic importance, although outbreaks have been observed in the past.

== Description ==
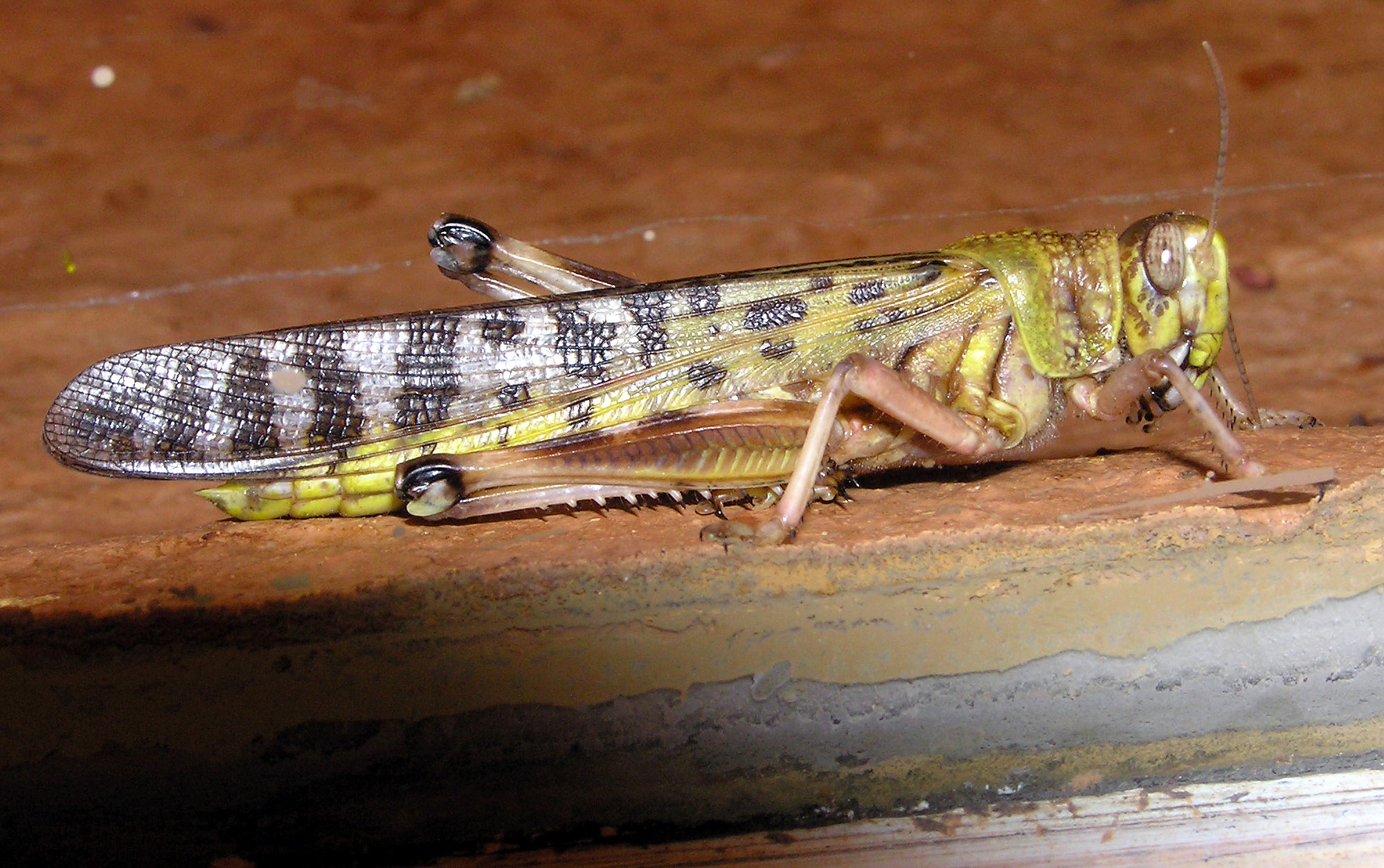
A gregarious phase adult

The genus Schistocerca consists of more than 30 species, distributed in Africa, Asia, and North and South America. Many species are difficult to identify due to the presence of variable morphs. Schistocerca is the only genus within the Cyrtacanthacridinae that occurs in both the New and Old World. Most species have the fastigium deflexed and lack lateral carinae on the pronotum. The hind tibia have smooth margins with numerous spines, however, there are no apical spine on the outer margin. Males in the genus have broad anal cerci and a split subgenital plate. The genus is thought to have originated in Africa and then speciated in the New World after a dispersal event that took place 6 to 7 million years ago.

Solitary females are 6–9 cm long, while solitary males are 4.5–6 cm. Gregarious females are 5–6 cm long, whereas gregarious males are 4.5–5 cm. The prosternal tubercle is straight, blunt and slightly sloping backwards. The Male subgenitial plate is biloped, ceri, flat and blunt. Elytra are marked with large irregular spots, and the pronotum is not crested, and is narrower and saddle-shaped in the gregarious phase. The eyes are striated, and the number of striae increases after each moult, only clearly visible in solitary individuals.

Solitary nymphs are greenish or pale beige and may go through six instars. Gregarious nymphs are typically yellow, with a black head and pronotum, black lateral stripes on the abdomen and pass through five instars. During the first instar, gregarious nymphs are almost entirely black. Adults: Immature solitary adults are sandy, pale grey or beige in colour; this colouration evolves to pale yellow in mature male adults and to pale beige with brown patterns in mature females. Immature gregarious adults are pink/reddish in colour, changing to bright yellow in mature males; in mature females the yellow is less bright, mainly on the upper parts of the body, with the lower parts being more of a pale beige. The hindwings are transparent or light yellow.

== Lifecycle ==
The lifecycle of the desert locust consists of three stages, the egg, the nymph known as a hopper, and the winged adult. Copulation takes place when a mature male hops onto the back of a mature female and grips her body with his legs. Sperm is transferred from the tip of his abdomen to the tip of hers, where it is stored. The process takes several hours and one insemination is sufficient for a number of batches of eggs.

The female locust then seeks suitable soft soil in which to lay her eggs. It needs to be the right temperature and degree of dampness and be in close proximity to other egg-laying females. She probes the soil with her abdomen and digs a hole into which an egg pod containing up to 100 eggs is deposited. The egg pod is 3 to 4 cm (1 1/8 to 1 5/8 in) long and the lower end is about 10 cm (4 in) below the surface of the ground. The eggs are surrounded by foam and this hardens into a membrane and plugs the hole above the egg pod. The eggs absorb moisture from the surrounding soil. The incubation period before the eggs hatch may be two weeks, or much longer, depending on the temperature.

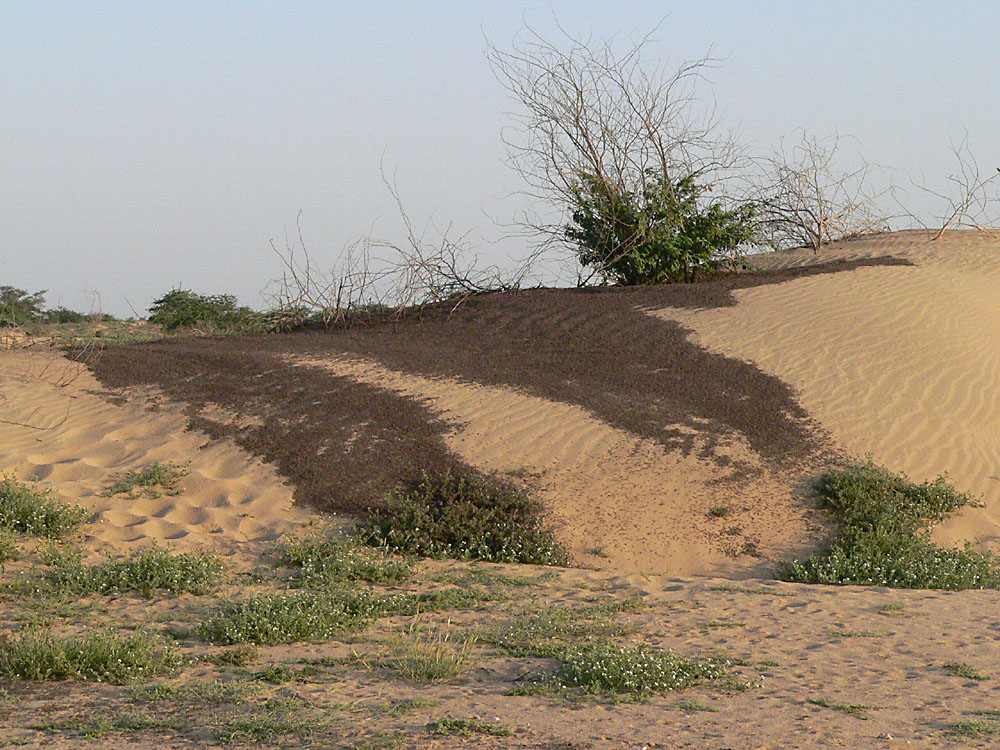
Dense hopper band in Sudan

The newly hatched nymph soon begins to feed, and if it is a gregarious individual, is attracted to other hoppers and they group together. As it grows, it needs to moult (shed its exoskeleton). Its hard cuticle splits and its body expands, while the new exoskeleton is still soft. The stages between moulting are called instars and the desert locust nymph undergoes five moults before becoming a winged adult. Immature and mature individuals in the gregarious phase form bands that feed, bask, and move as cohesive units, while solitary-phase individuals do not seek conspecifics.

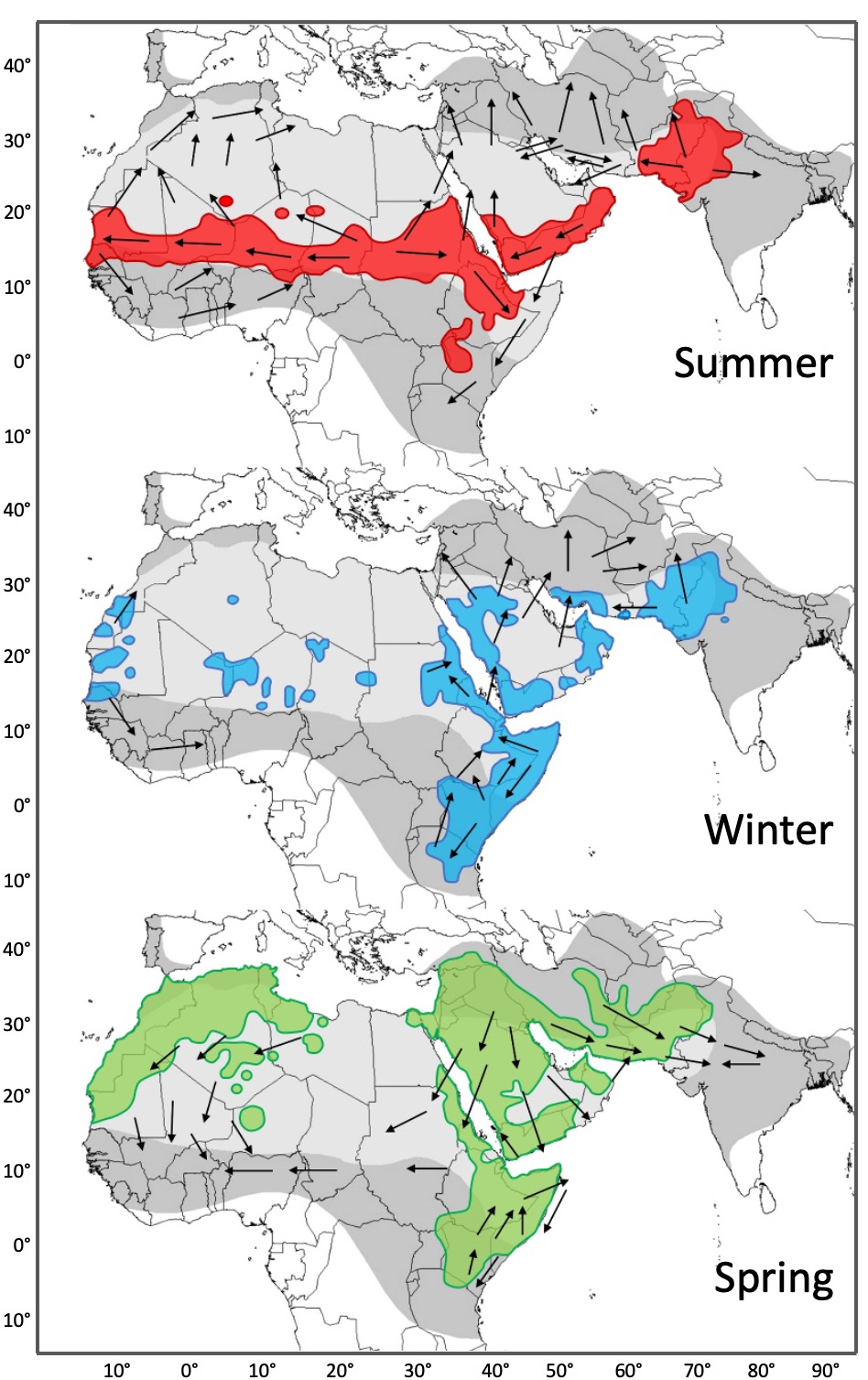
Seasonal breeding areas and swarm movements of desert locust during the invasion periods (modified from Pedgley, 1981). Red: summer breeding area with hopper bands present from July to September and direction of swarms (arrows) from August to October. Blue: winter breeding area with hopper bands present from October to February and direction of swarms (arrows) from December to March. Green: spring breeding area with hopper bands present from March to May and direction of swarms (arrows) from April to July. In light grey, the recession area; the light and dark grey together represent the invasion area (Modified from Pedgley, 1981).

After the imaginal moult, the young adult is initially soft with drooping wings, but within a few days, the cuticle hardens and haemolymph is pumped into the wings, stiffening them.

Maturation can occur in 2–4 weeks when the food supply and weather conditions are suitable but may take as long as 6 months when they are less ideal. Males start maturing first and give off an odour that stimulates maturation in the females. On maturing, the insects turn yellow and the abdomens of the females start swelling with developing eggs.

== Ecology and swarming ==
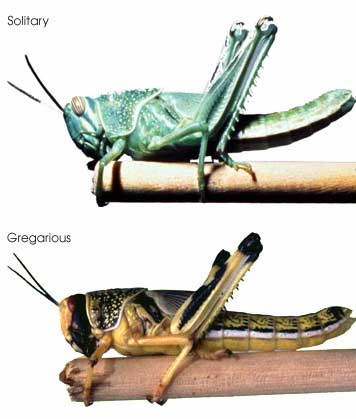
Solitary (top) and gregarious (bottom) desert locust nymphs

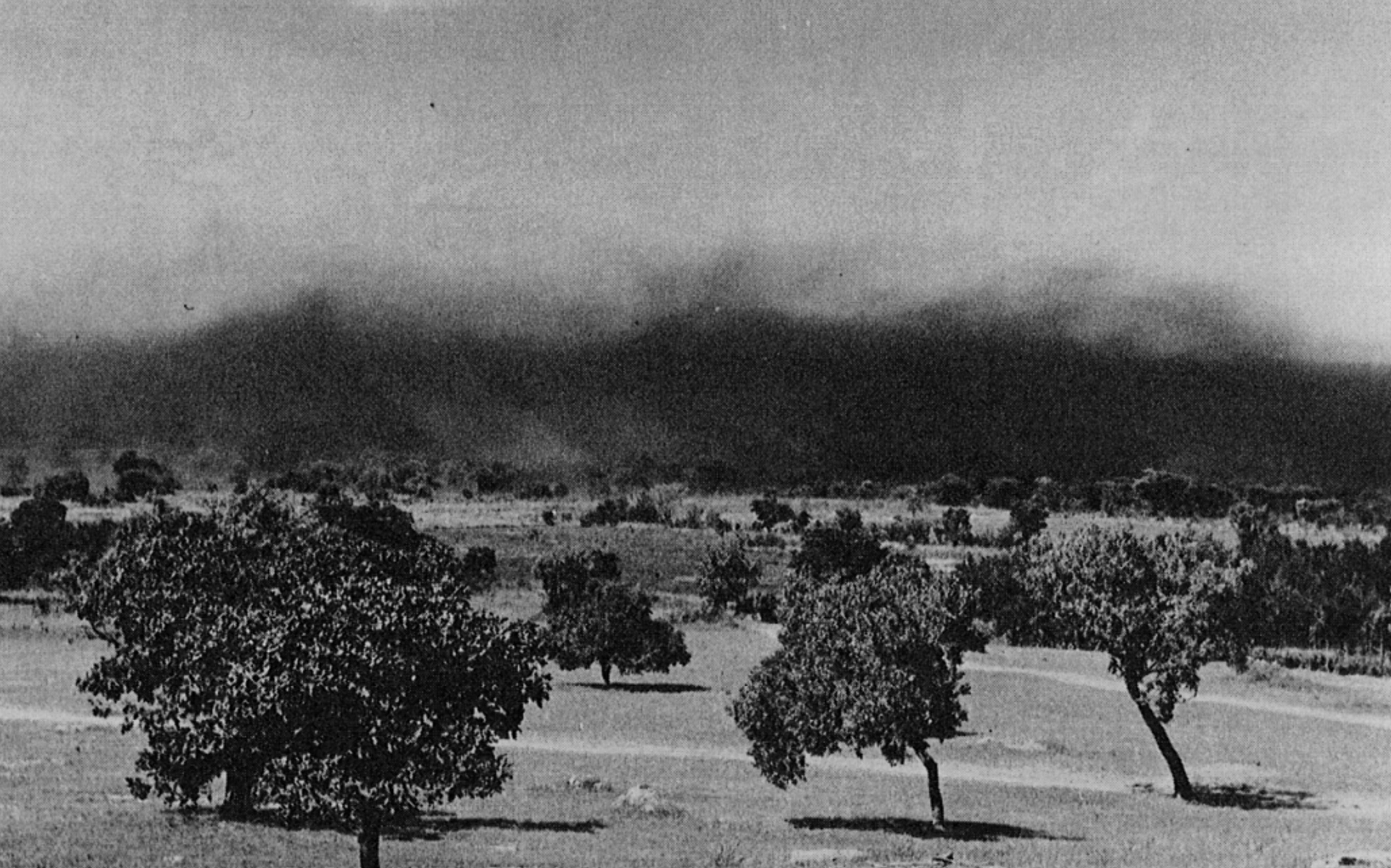
Historic image of a desert locust swarm, Morocco, ca. 1954 during the 1949-62 major invasion. A mass of locusts is masking the landscape in the background. The front of the swarm resembles a sandstorm. (photo Hans Brédo, in Liselotte Brédo-Bartelous, 1997)

Desert locusts have a solitary phase and a gregarious phase, a type of polyphenism. Solitary locusts nymphs and adults can behave gregariously within a few hours of being placed in a crowded situation, while gregarious locusts need one or more generations to become solitary when reared in isolation. Differences in morphology and behaviour are seen between the two phases. In the solitary phase, the hoppers do not group together into bands but move about independently. Their colouring in the later instars tends to be greenish or brownish to match the colour of their surrounding vegetation. The adults fly at night and are also coloured so as to blend into their surroundings, the immature adults being grey or beige and the mature adults being a pale yellowish colour. In the gregarious phase, the hoppers bunch together and in the later instars develop a bold colouring with black markings on a yellow background. The immatures are pink and the mature adults are bright yellow and fly during the day in dense swarms.

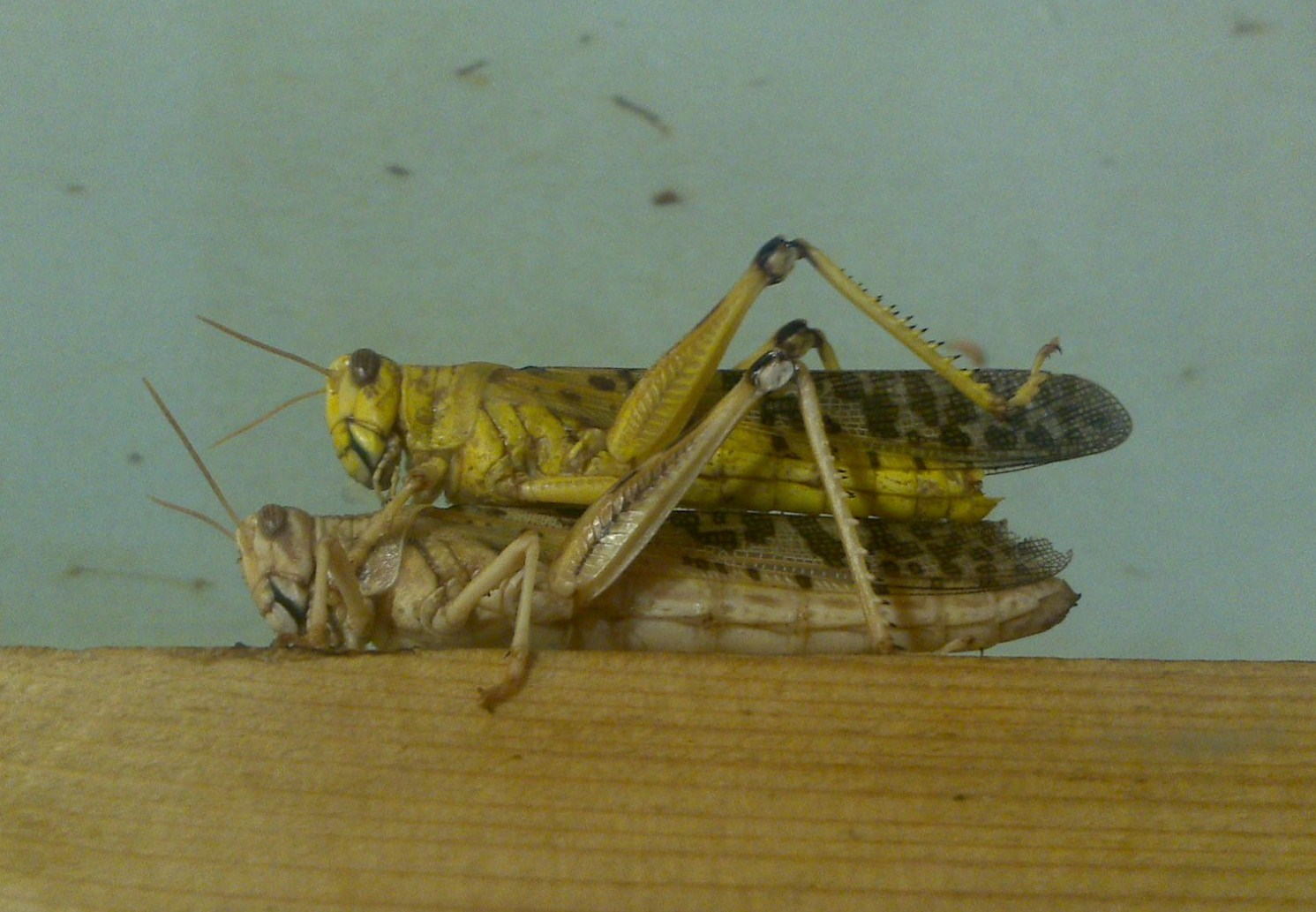
Desert locusts preparatory to mating

The change from an innocuous solitary insect to a voracious gregarious one normally follows a period of drought, when rain falls and vegetation flushes occur in major desert locust breeding locations. The population builds up rapidly and the competition for food increases. As hoppers get more crowded, the close physical contact causes the insects' hind legs to bump against one another. This stimulus triggers a cascade of metabolic and behavioral changes that causes the insects to transform from the solitary to the gregarious phase. When the hoppers become gregarious, their colouration changes from largely green to yellow and black, and the adults change from brown to pink (immature) or yellow (mature). Their bodies become shorter, and they give off a pheromone that causes them to be attracted to each other, enhancing hopper band and subsequently swarm formation. The nymphal pheromone is different from the adult one. When exposed to the adult pheromone, hoppers become confused and disoriented, because they can apparently no longer "smell" each other, though the visual and tactile stimuli remain. After a few days, the hopper bands disintegrate and those that escape predation become solitary again.

During quiet periods, called recessions, desert locusts are confined to a 16-million-square-kilometre (6.2-million-square-mile) belt that extends from Mauritania through the Sahara Desert in northern Africa, across the Arabian Peninsula, and into northwest India. Under optimal ecological and climatic conditions, several successive generations can occur, causing swarms to form and invade countries on all sides of the recession area, as far north as Spain and Russia, as far south as Nigeria and Kenya, and as far east as India and southwest Asia. As many as 60 countries can be affected within an area of 32 million square kilometres (12 million square miles), or about 20% of the Earth's land surface.

Locust swarms fly with the wind at roughly the speed of the wind. They can cover from 100 to 200 km (62 to 124 mi) in a day, and fly up to about 2,000 metres (6,600 ft) above sea level (the temperature becomes too cold at higher altitudes). Therefore, swarms cannot cross tall mountain ranges such as the Atlas, the Hindu Kush, or the Himalayas. They do not venture into the rain forests of Africa nor into central Europe. However, locust adults and swarms regularly cross the Red Sea between Africa and the Arabian Peninsula, and are even reported to have crossed the Atlantic Ocean from Africa to the Caribbean in 10 days during the 1987–89 plague. A single swarm can cover up to 1,200 square kilometres (460 sq mi) and can contain between 40 and 80 million locusts per square kilometre (100,000,000 and 210,000,000 per square mile) (a total of around 50 to 100 billion locusts per swarm, representing 100,000 to 200,000 metric tons (98,000 to 197,000 long tons; 110,000 to 220,000 short tons), considering an average mass of 2 g per locust). The locust can live between 3 and 6 months, and a 10- to 16-fold increase in locust numbers occurs from one generation to the next.

== Impacts of the desert locust ==
=== Economic impact ===
The desert locust is probably the oldest and most dangerous migratory pest in the world. The scale of the invasions and destruction they cause is due to their exceptional gregarious nature, their mobility, the voracity and size of their hopper bands and swarms. Desert locust invasions can be absolutely devastating and have serious repercussions on national and regional food security and on the livelihoods of affected rural communities, particularly the poorest. Added to this damage is the cost of control operations implemented to protect crops, which also help to stop the spread of the invasion, which could otherwise continue for many years and over larger areas. Furthermore, the damage is not limited to crops, but must also include the multiple social and environmental consequences of invasions, which are now better understood and taken into account, even if they are difficult to estimate.

Desert locusts consume an estimated equivalent of their body weight (2 g (0.07 oz)) each day in green vegetation. They are polyphagous and feed on leaves, shoots, flowers, fruit, seeds, stems, and bark. Nearly all crops and noncrop plants are eaten, including pearl millet, maize, sorghum, barley, rice, pasture grasses, sugarcane, cotton, fruit trees, date palms, banana plants, vegetables, and weeds.

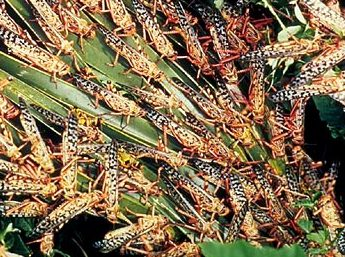
Locusts feeding

Crop loss from locusts was noted in the Bible and Qur'an; these insects have been documented as contributing to the severity of a number of Ethiopian famines. Since the early 20th century, desert locust plagues occurred in 1926–1934, 1940–1948, 1949–1963, 1967–1969, 1987–1989, 2003–2005, and 2019–2020. In March–October 1915, a plague of locusts stripped Ottoman Palestine of almost all vegetation. The significant crop loss caused by swarming desert locusts exacerbates problems of food shortage, and is a threat to food security.

=== Environmental impact ===
Desert locust control still relies mainly on chemical pesticides. In the event of an invasion, control operations are of such magnitude that the products used can have serious side effects on human health, the environment, non-target organisms and biodiversity. These side effects are increasingly well known. Correct application of the preventive strategy recommended by the FAO and the use of good treatment practices that are more respectful of people and the environment can limit the negative impacts of these large-scale sprayings.

=== Social impact ===
The external social costs to the local human population during desert locust outbreaks can be enormous, but difficult to estimate. Crop and pasture losses can lead to severe food shortages and a large imbalance in food rations, large price fluctuations in markets, insufficient availability of grazing areas, the sale of animals at very low prices to meet household subsistence needs and to buy feed for remaining animals, early transhumance of herds and high tensions between transhumant herders and local farmers, and significant human migration to urban areas (sometimes fatal for the elderly, the weak and young children). Other economic consequences can occur during harvest, as cereals can be contaminated with insect parts and downgraded to feed grains that are sold at a lower price. In addition, the negative income shock can have a long-term impact on the educational outcomes of children living in rural areas.

=== Beneficial impact ===
The potential benefits of locust swarms are seldom acknowledged. However, locusts are not all bad, as the biomass of locust individuals contributes greatly to ecosystem processes in case of an invasion. Locust frass and cadavers are rich in nutrients which are transferred to the soil via decomposition by micro-organisms and fungi, absorbed by plants, increasing net ecosystem productivity and ecosystem nutrient cycling through rapid mineralization rates of nitrogen and carbon.

== Early warning and preventive control ==
Early warning and preventive control is the strategy adopted by locust-affected countries in Africa and Asia to try to stop locust plagues from developing and spreading. In the 1920s-1930s, locust control became a major field for international cooperation. The International Agricultural Institute developed several programmes aimed at exchanging data about the desert locust and international conferences were held in the 1930s: Rome in 1931, Paris in 1932, London in 1934, Cairo in 1936, and Brussels in 1938. Colonial empires were heavily involved in these attempts to control locust pests, which affected heavily the Middle East and parts of Africa. The USSR also used locust control as a way to expand its influence in the Middle East and Central Asia.

FAO's Desert Locust Information Service (DLIS) in Rome monitors the weather, ecological conditions, and the locust situation on a daily basis. DLIS receives results of survey and control operations carried out by national teams in affected countries. The teams use a variety of innovative digital devices, such as eLocust3, to collect, record and transmit standardized data in real-time to their national locust centres for decision-making. This data is automatically integrated into SWARMS, the global monitoring and early warning system operated by DLIS. Within this system, the field data are combined with the latest satellite imagery to actively monitor rainfall, vegetation and soil moisture conditions in the locust breeding area from West Africa to India. This is supplemented by sub-seasonal and seasonal temperature and rainfall predictions up to six months in advance as well as other weather forecasts and data from NOAA and ECMWF. Models are used to estimate egg and hopper development rates and swarm trajectories (NOAA HYSPLIT) and dispersion (UK Met Office NAME). DLIS uses a custom GIS to analyze the field data, satellite imagery, weather predictions and model results to assess the current situation and forecast the timing, scale, and location of breeding and migration up to six weeks in advance. The situation assessments and forecasts are published in monthly locust bulletins that date back to the 1970s. These are supplemented by warnings and alerts to affected countries and the international community. This information is available on the FAO Locust Watch website. DLIS continuously adopts the latest technologies as innovative tools, including drones, to improve monitoring and early warning. FAO also provides information and training to affected countries and coordinates funding from donor agencies in case of major upsurges and plagues.

The desert locust is a difficult pest to control, and control measures are further compounded by the large and often remote areas (16–30 million square kilometres (6.2–11.6 million square miles)) where locusts can be found. Undeveloped basic infrastructure in some affected countries, limited resources for locust monitoring and control, and political turmoil within and between affected countries further reduce the capacity of a country to undertake the necessary monitoring and control activities.

At present, the primary method of controlling desert locust infestations is with insecticides applied in small, concentrated doses by vehicle-mounted and aerial sprayers at ultra-low volume rates of application. The insecticide is acquired by the insect directly, meaning that control must be precise. Control is undertaken by government agencies in locust-affected countries or by specialized regional aerial organizations such as the Desert Locust Control Organization for East Africa (DLCO-EA).

The desert locust has natural enemies such as predatory wasps and flies, parasitoid wasps, predatory beetle larvae, birds, and reptiles. These may be effective at keeping solitary populations in check but are of limited effects against gregarious desert locusts because of the enormous numbers of insects in the swarms and hopper bands.

Farmers often try mechanical means of killing locusts, such as digging trenches and burying hopper bands, but this is very labour-intensive and is difficult to undertake when large infestations are scattered over a wide area. Farmers also try to scare locust swarms away from their fields by making noise, burning tires, or other methods. This tends to shift the problem to neighbouring farms, and locust swarms can easily return to reinfest previously visited fields.

In Libya, a desert locust invasion is particularly threatening the crops and flora of the oases and their farms.

== Biopesticides ==
Biopesticides include fungi, bacteria, neem extract, and pheromones. The effectiveness of many biopesticides equals that of conventional chemical pesticides, but two distinct differences exist. Biopesticides in general take longer to kill insects, plant diseases, or weeds, usually between 2 and 10 days.

The two types of biopesticides are biochemical and microbial. Biochemical pesticides are similar to naturally occurring chemicals and are nontoxic, such as insect pheromones used to locate mates, while microbial biopesticides, come from bacteria, fungi, algae, or viruses that either occur naturally or are genetically altered. Entomopathogenic fungi generally suppress pests by mycosis - causing a disease that is specific to the insect.

Biological control products have been under development since the late 1990s; Green Muscle and NOVACRID are based on a naturally occurring entomopathogenic fungus, Metarhizium acridum. Species of Metarhizium are widespread throughout the world, infecting many groups of insects, but pose low risk to humans, other mammals, and birds. The species M. acridum has specialised in short-horned grasshoppers, to which these locusts belong, so has been chosen as the active ingredient of the product.

The product is available in Australia under the name Green Guard and in Africa, it used to be available as Green Muscle. However, since Green Muscle seems to have disappeared from the market, another product, NOVACRID, was developed for Africa, Central Asia, and the Middle East. These products are applied in the same way as chemical insecticides, but do not kill as quickly. At recommended doses, the fungus can take up to two weeks to kill up to 90% of the locusts. For that reason, it is recommended for use mainly against hoppers, the wingless early stages of locusts. These are mostly found in the desert, far from cropping areas, where the delay in death does not result in damage. The advantage of the product is that it affects only grasshoppers and locusts, which makes it much safer than chemical insecticides. Specifically, it allows the natural enemies of locusts and grasshoppers to continue preying upon them. These include birds, parasitoid and predatory wasps, parasitoid flies, and certain species of beetles. Though natural enemies cannot prevent plagues, they can limit the frequency of outbreaks and contribute to their control. Biopesticides are also safer to use in environmentally sensitive areas such as national parks or near rivers and other water bodies.

Green Muscle was developed under the LUBILOSA programme, which was initiated in 1989 in response to environmental concerns over the heavy use of chemical insecticides to control locusts and grasshoppers during the 1987-89 plague. The project focused on the use of beneficial disease-causing microorganisms (pathogens) as biological control agents for grasshoppers and locusts. These insects were considered too mobile and too fecund for their numbers to be curbed by classical biological control. Pathogens bear a distinct advantage in that many can be produced in artificial culture in large quantities and be used with ubiquitous spraying equipment. Entomopathogenic fungi were traditionally regarded as needing humid conditions to be effective. However, the LUBILOSA programme devised a method to overcome this by spraying fungal spores in an oil formulation. Even under desert conditions, Green Muscle can be used to kill locusts and other acridid pests, such as the Senegalese grasshopper. During trials in Algeria and Mauritania in 2005 and 2006, various natural enemies, but especially birds, were abundant enough to eliminate treated hopper bands in about a week, because the diseased hoppers became sluggish and easy to catch.

== Desert locust plagues and upsurges ==
In the 1900s, there were six major desert locust plagues, one of which lasted almost 13 years.

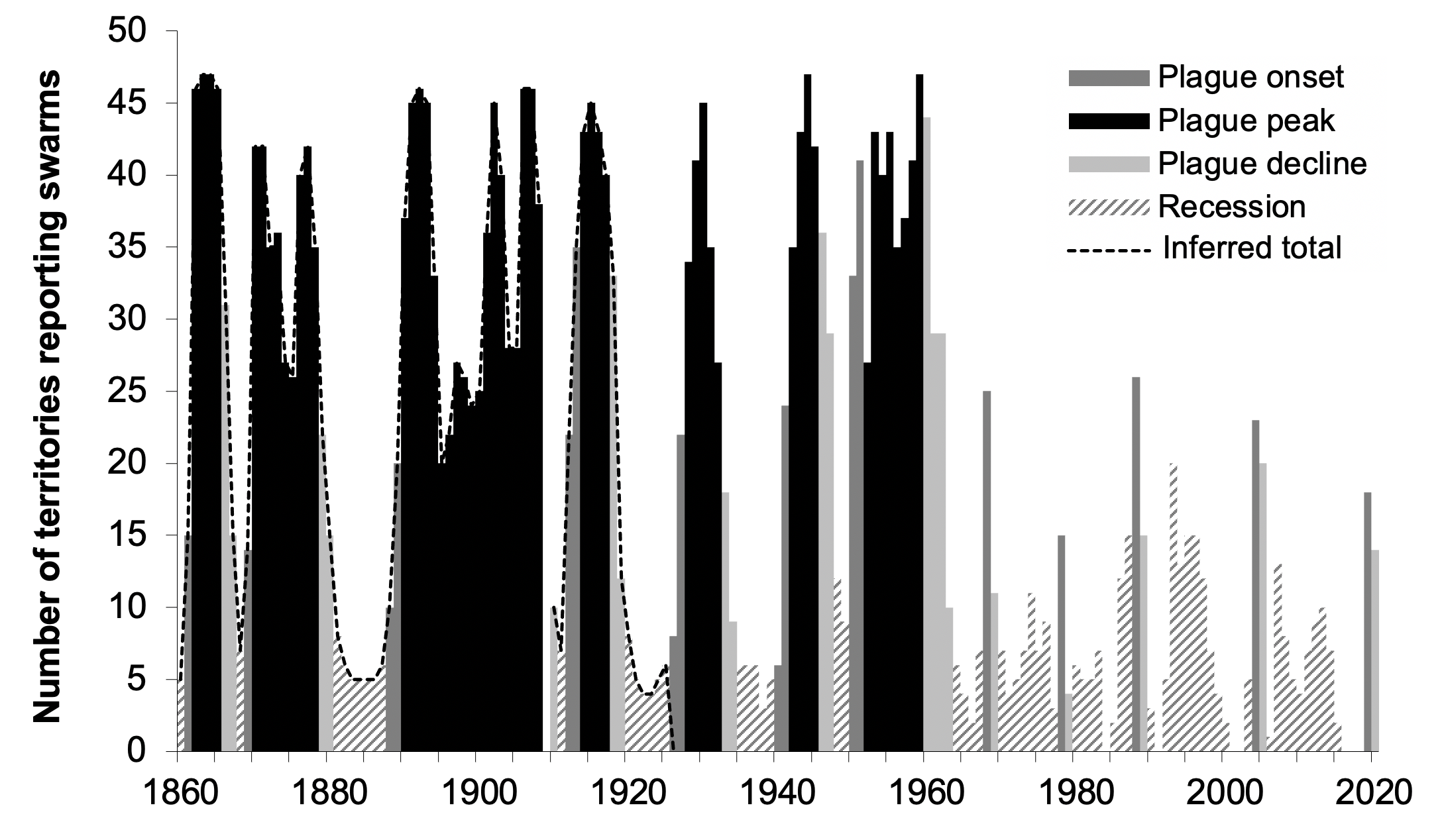
Territories recording Desert Locust swarms 1860–2020 (after Waloff, 1966, 1976, and Magor et al. 2008, updated). Notice the sharp decrease in the importance of the invasions from the 1960s (After Waloff, 1966, 1976, and Magor et al. 2008, updated).

=== 1915 Ottoman Syria locust infestation ===
From March to October 1915, swarms of locusts stripped areas in and around Palestine, Mount Lebanon and Syria of almost all vegetation. This infestation seriously compromised the already-depleted food supply of the region and sharpened the misery of all Jerusalemites.

=== 1960s to present ===
Since the early 1960s, there have been two desert locust plagues (1967-1968 and 1986-1989) and six desert locust upsurges (1972–1974, 1992–1994, 1994–1996, 2004–2005, 1996–1998, and 2019-2021).

=== 2004–2005 upsurge (West Africa) ===
From October 2003 to May 2005, West Africa faced the largest and most numerous desert locust infestations in 15 years. The upsurge started as small, independent outbreaks that developed in Mauritania, Mali, Niger, and Sudan in the autumn of 2003. Two days of unusually heavy rains that stretched from Dakar, Senegal, to Morocco in October allowed breeding conditions to remain favourable for the next 6 months and the desert locusts rapidly increased. Lack of rain and cold temperatures in the winter breeding area of northwest Africa in early 2005 slowed the development of the locusts and allowed the locust control agencies to stop the cycle. During the upsurge, nearly 130,000 square kilometres (50,000 square miles) were treated by ground and aerial operations in 23 countries. The costs of fighting this upsurge have been estimated by the FAO to have exceeded US$400 million, and harvest losses were valued at up to US$2.5 billion, which had disastrous effects on food security in West Africa. The countries affected by the 2004-2005 upsurge were Algeria, Burkina Faso, the Canary Islands, Cape Verde, Chad, Egypt, Ethiopia, the Gambia, Greece, Guinea, Guinea Bissau, Israel, Jordan, Lebanon, Libyan Arab Jamahiriya, Mali, Mauritania, Morocco, Niger, Saudi Arabia, Senegal, Sudan, Syria, and Tunisia.

=== 2019–2021 desert locust upsurge ===
In May 2018, Cyclone Mekunu brought unprecedented rainfall to the Empty Quarter of the Arabian Peninsula that was followed by Cyclone Luban that brought heavy rains again to the same area in October. This allowed conditions to be favourable for three generations of breeding, which caused an estimated 8,000-fold increase in Desert Locust numbers that went unchecked because the area was so remote it could not be accessed by national locust teams.

In early 2019, waves of swarms migrated from this remote and inaccessible area north to the interior of Saudi Arabia and southern Iran, and southwest to the interior of Yemen. Both areas received good rains, including heavy flooding in southwest Iran (the worst in 50 years), that allowed another two generations of breeding to take place. While control operations were mounted against the northern movement and subsequent breeding, very little could be done in Yemen due to the ongoing conflict. As a result, new swarms formed that crossed the southern Red Sea and the Gulf of Aden and invaded the Horn of Africa, specifically northeast Ethiopia and northern Somalia in June 2019. Again, good rains allowed further breeding during the summer, followed by another generation of widespread breeding during the autumn in eastern Ethiopia and central Somalia, which was exacerbated by the unusually late occurring Cyclone Pawan in northeast Somalia in early December. The swarms that subsequently formed invaded Kenya in late December 2019 and spread throughout the country where they bred in between the rainy seasons because of unusual rainfall. Kenya had only witnessed swarm invasions twice in the past 75 years (1955 and 2007). Some swarms also invaded Uganda, South Sudan, Tanzania and one small swarm reached northeast D.R. Congo, the first time since 1945.

The situation improved in Kenya and elsewhere by the summer of 2020 due to large-scale aerial control operations, made available by generous assistance from international partners. Nevertheless, food security and livelihoods were impacted throughout the region. Despite the control efforts, good rains continued to fall and breeding occurred again during the summer and autumn in Ethiopia and Somalia that led to another invasion of Kenya in December 2020, which was eventually brought under control by spring 2021. Again, unexpected rains fell in late April and early May, this time further north that allowed substantial breeding to occur in eastern Ethiopia and northern Somalia in May and June 2021. New swarms formed in June and July that moved to northeast Ethiopia for a generation of breeding that could not be addressed due to conflict and insecurity, which prolonged the upsurge in the Horn of Africa. The upsurge was finally brought under control by early 2022 as a result of successful and intensive control operations in northern Somalia and poor rainfall. As of 1 April 2022 there are no locust crises anywhere in the world but swarms are expected in October in the Sahel, Yemen and on the India–Pakistan border.

In southwest Asia, the upsurge was brought under control much earlier because of a massive effort undertaken by India and Pakistan along both sides of their common border during the summer of 2020 that followed from earlier control operations during the spring of 2019 and 2020 by Iran and during the summer of 2019 by Pakistan and India. In June 2020, Cyclone Nisarga helped spread swarms across the northern states of India where a few reached the Himalayan foothills in Nepal.

In response to the upsurge, the Director-General of FAO declared a Level 3 corporate-wide emergency, the highest level in the UN system, on 17 January 2020 and appealed for immediate international assistance to rapidly upscale monitoring and control activities in the Horn of Africa. One month later, Somalia declared a state of emergency. Similarly, Pakistan also declared a state of emergency. The UN continued to warn that the Horn of Africa was facing a dangerous situation.

Fortunately, the international community responded quickly and generously despite other urgent situations such as COVID-19, and the $230 million appeal by FAO was fully funded. This allowed ground and aerial operations to treat 2.3 million hectares (5.7 million acres) of desert locust in the Horn of Africa and Yemen in 2020 and 2021. Up to 20 aircraft were deployed simultaneously, supported by hundreds of ground teams, and more than 1.4 million locations were surveyed. These collective efforts averted 4.5 million metric tons (4,400,000 long tons; 5,000,000 short tons) of crop losses, saved 900 million litres (240,000,000 US gallons) of milk production, and secured food for nearly 47 million people. The commercial value of the cereal and milk loss averted is estimated at $1.77 billion.

FAO's Locust Watch contains the latest situation and forecasts as well as a full, detailed description of the recent upsurge.

== Pheromones ==
The swarming pheromone guaiacol is produced in the gut of desert locusts by the breakdown of plant material. This process is undertaken by the gut bacterium Pantoea (Enterobacter) agglomerans. Guaiacol is one of the main components of the pheromones that cause locust swarming. Pheromones also accelerate S. gregaria development. Mahamat et al., 1993 find that an undifferentiated mix of several volatiles derived from the males of the species (including guaiacol) speed up the maturation process of both immature males and females.

== In research ==
S. gregaria was one of the organisms examined by McNeill and Hoyle 1967 and found to have thinner muscle filaments than those before found. This contributed greatly to the development of the sliding filament theory.

Westerman showed that exposure of S. gregaria males to a dose of X-rays during the S-phase (DNA synthesis phase) of spermatogonial mitoses and during the early stages of meiosis (leptotene-early zygotene stages) caused a significant increase in chiasmata frequency when scored at the later stages (diplotene-diakinesis stages) of meiosis. These results indicated that the formation of chiasmata is not an isolated event but the end product of an interrelated series of processes initiated at some earlier stage of meiosis.

== In culture ==
Given the long history of desert locust, it is to be expected that references of the world's most dangerous migratory pest have crept into popular film and literature as well as many of the world's religions.

=== Film ===
Owing to the destructive habits of locusts, they have been a representation of famine in many Middle Eastern cultures, and are seen in the movies Kaappaan, The Mummy (1999) and The Bible (1966).

=== Religious books ===
This species has been identified as one of the kosher species of locusts mentioned in Leviticus 11:22 by several rabbinical authorities among Middle Eastern Jewish communities.

=== Literature ===
- 1939 - The Day of the Locust by Nathanael West.
- 1948 - Poka (Bengali: পোকা) (transl. The Insect) by Premendra Mitra.
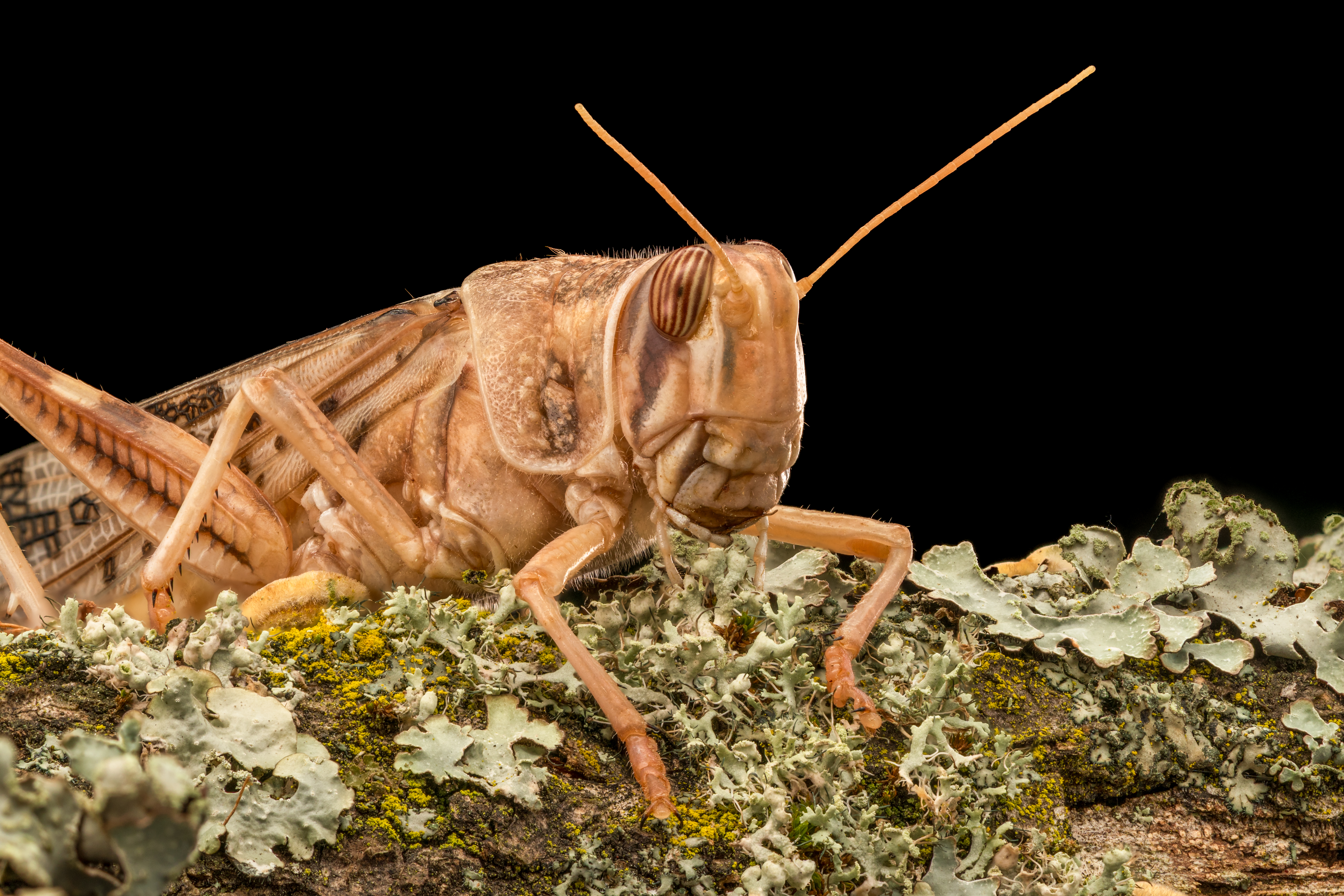
High resolution image (focus stack)

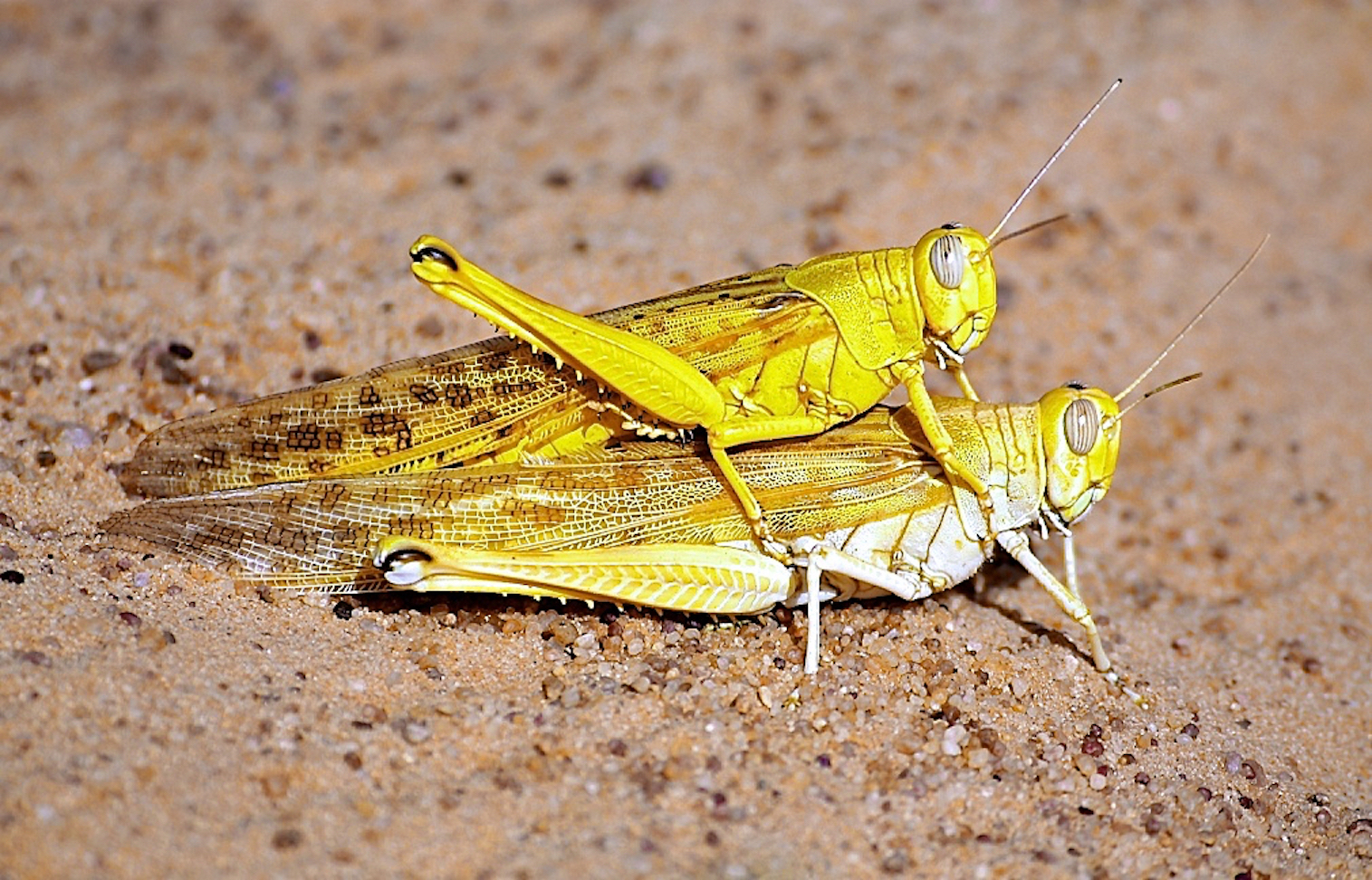
Mating of adult desert locusts (photo FAO-DLIS)

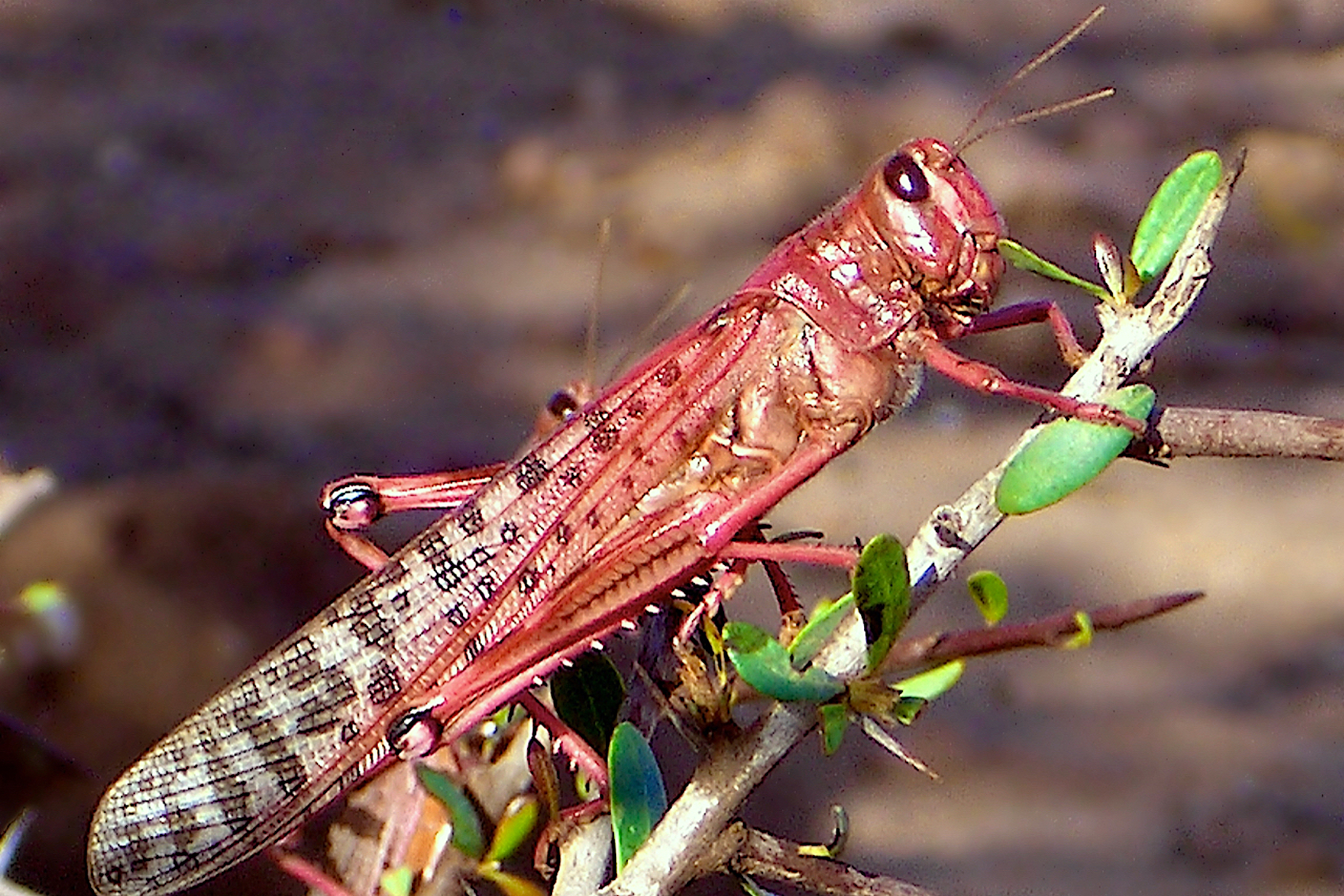
Immature adult of the desert locust (photo Said Ghaout, CNLAA, Maroc)

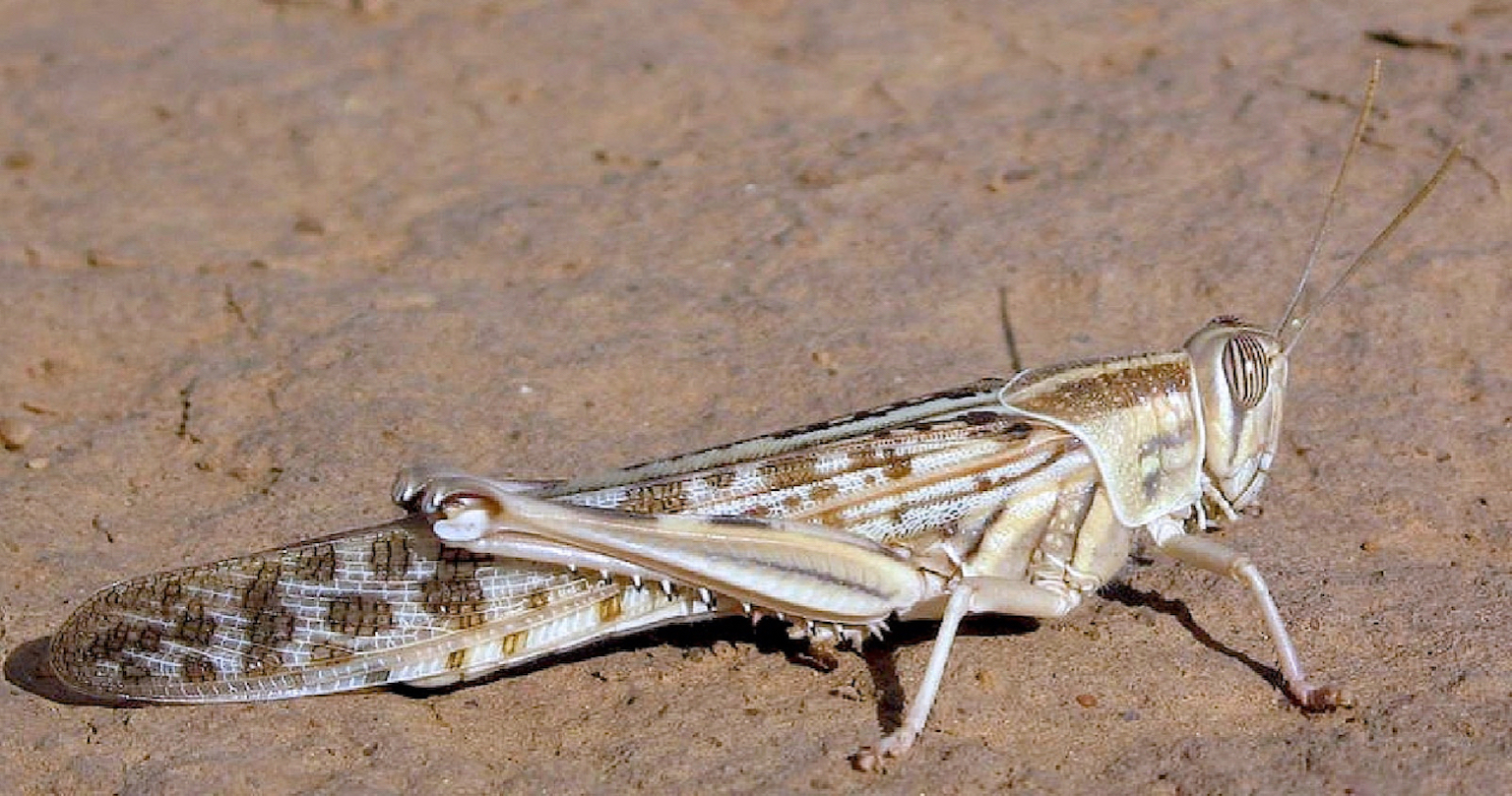
Solitary adult of the desert locust (photo Michel Lecoq)

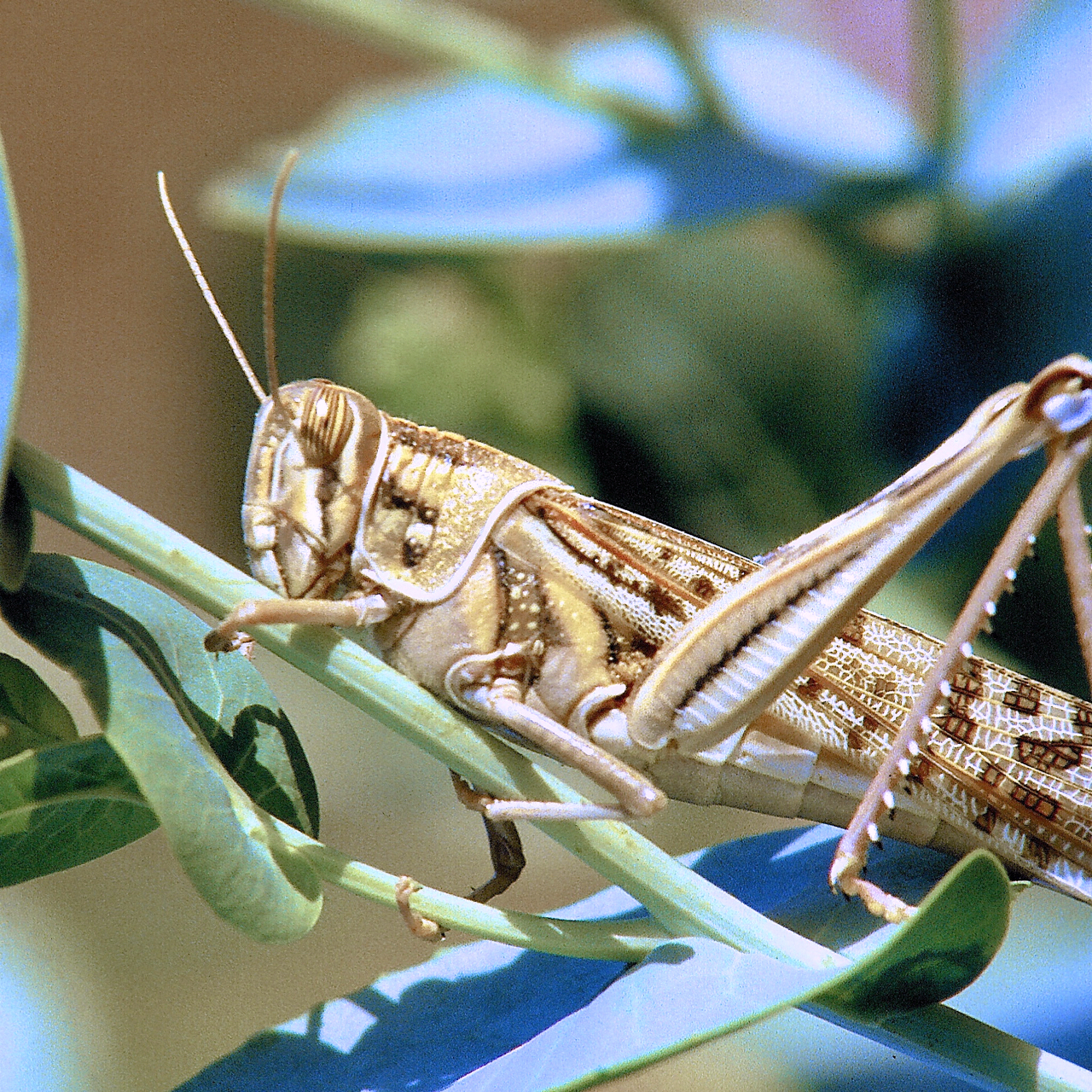
Solitary adult of the desert locust (photo Michel Lecoq)

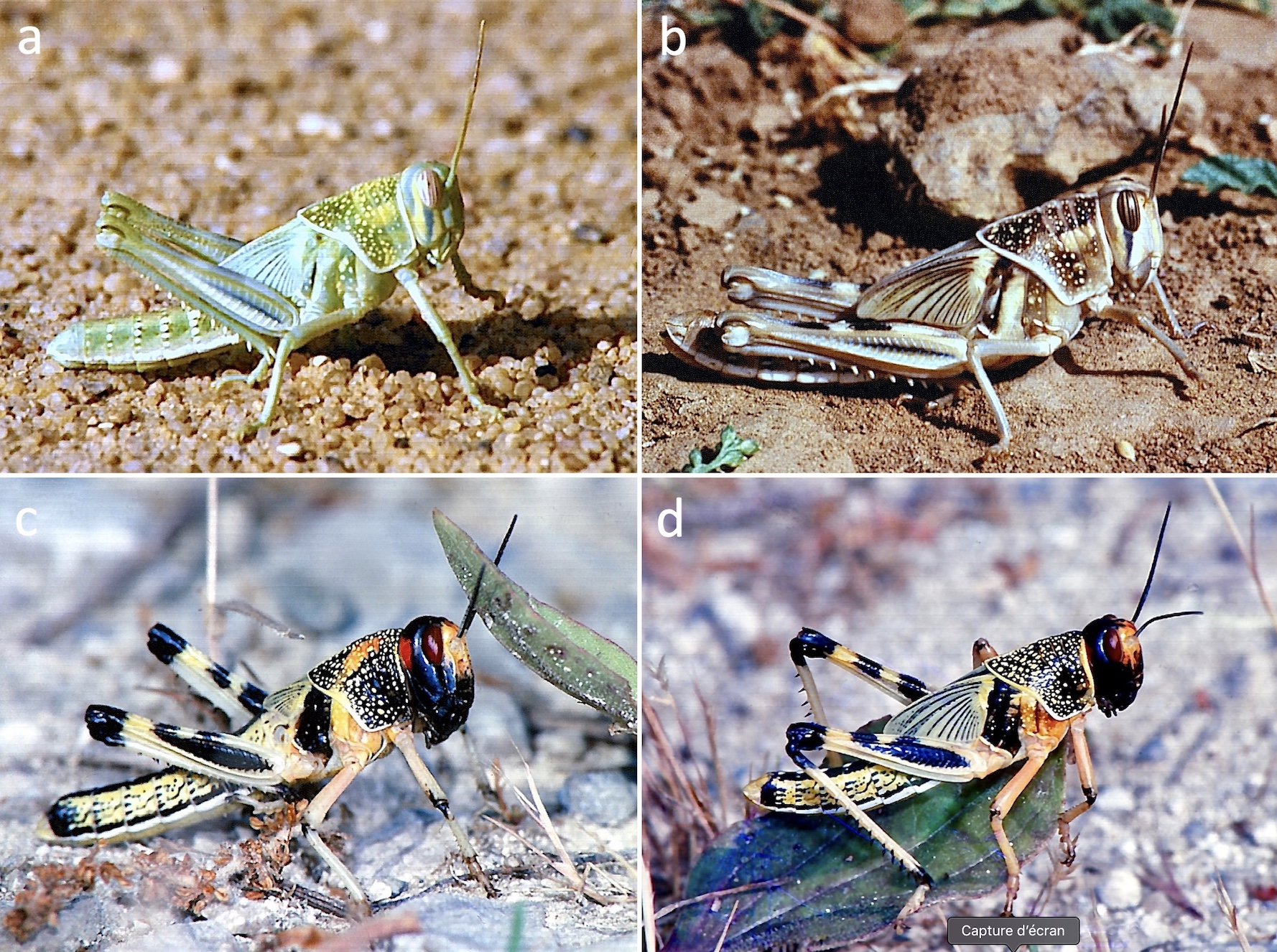
Nymphs of the desert locust: green (a) and brown (b) solitarious nymphs (5th instar); gregarious nymphs of 4th (c) and 5th instars (d) (a, Michel Lecoq; b, Antoine Foucart; c and d, Gilles Balança; CIRAD)

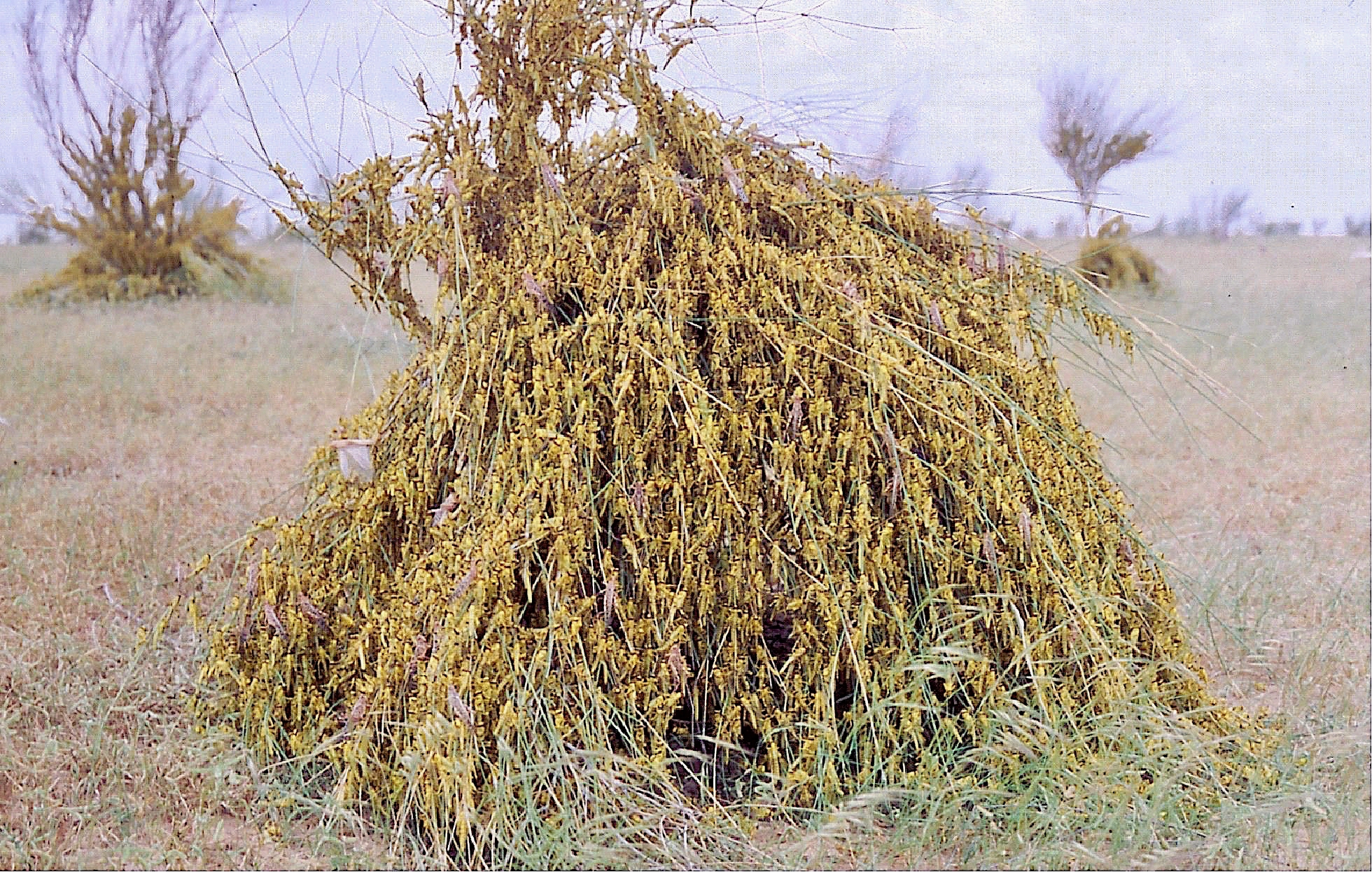
Part of a dense band of 5th instar nymphs and young fledging of Schistocerca gregaria in Chad in 1988 (photo Michel Lecoq).
