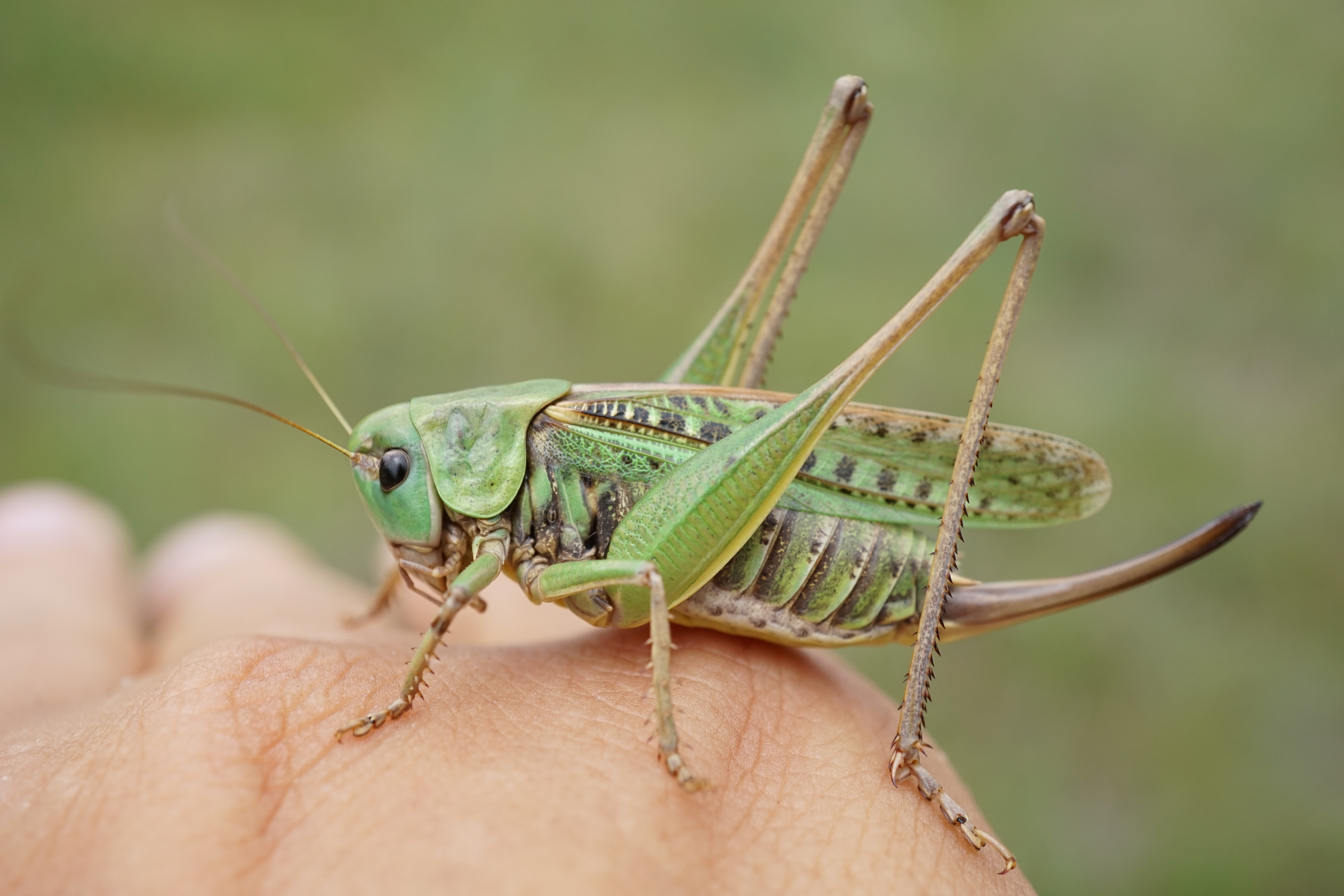
- Adult female of the green morph
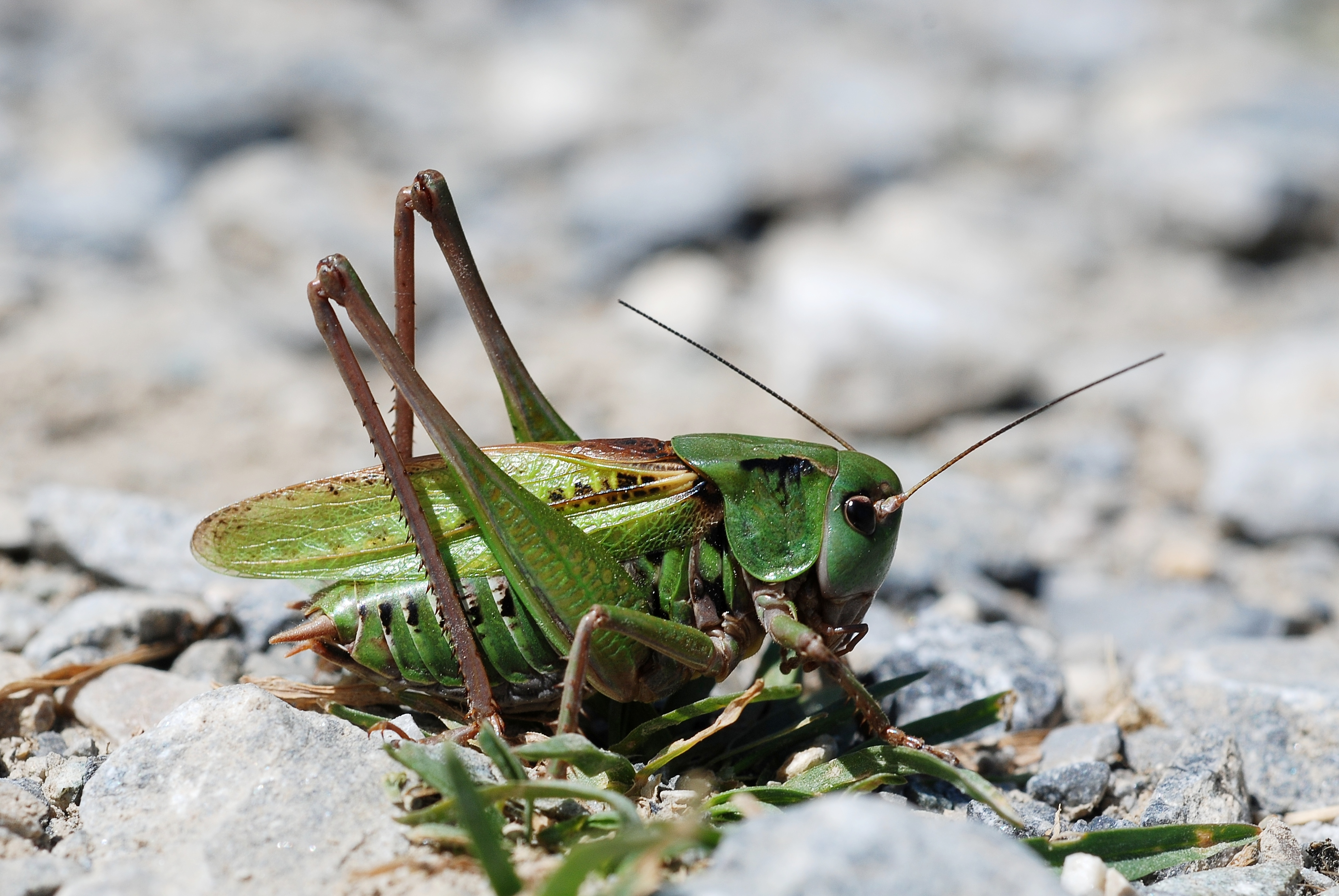
- Male

Scientific classification
- Kingdom: Animalia
- Phylum: Arthropoda
- Clade: Pancrustacea
- Class: Insecta
- Order: Orthoptera
- Suborder: Ensifera
- Family: Tettigoniidae
- Subfamily: Tettigoniinae
- Tribe: Decticini
- Genus: Decticus
- Species: D. verrucivorus

Binomial name
- Decticus verrucivorus (Linnaeus, 1758)

= Wart-biter =

Species of insect

Close-Up of a Decticus verrucivorus

Sound of Decticus verrucivorus
Field recording in the Netherlands 30s

The wart-biter (Decticus verrucivorus) is a bush-cricket in the family Tettigoniidae. Its common and scientific names derive from the eighteenth-century Swedish practice of allowing the crickets to nibble at warts to remove them.

== Description ==
Adult wart-biters are 31–37 millimetres (1.2–1.5 in), with females being significantly larger than males. They are typically dark green in colour, and shiny, always with at least some dark brown mottling or blotches on the pronotum and wings; a largely dark brown morphotype also occurs, though still mottled with some green. The female has a 20 mm long and slightly upcurved ovipositor. Their colour acts as effective camouflage in grassy surroundings.

The wart-biter has a song consisting of a rapidly repeated series of short bursts of clicks starting slowly and speeding up, sometimes lasting for several minutes; it only sings in sunny weather.

Wart-biters normally move around by walking; they rarely fly, except when frightened. Most can only fly 3 to 4 metres (10 to 13 ft) at a time.

== Subspecies ==
The Orthoptera Species File lists:

- D. verrucivorus assiduus Ingrisch, Willemse & Heller, 1992
- D. verrucivorus brevipennis Götz, 1970
- D. verrucivorus crassus Götz, 1970
- D. verrucivorus gracilis Uvarov, 1930
- D. verrucivorus latipennis Liu, Chen & Liu, 2020
- D. verrucivorus longipennis Nedelkov, 1907
- D. verrucivorus mithati Ramme, 1939
- D. verrucivorus monspeliensis Rambur, 1838
- D. verrucivorus sayram Liu, Chen & Liu, 2020
- D. verrucivorus stoljarovi Götz, 1970
- D. verrucivorus verrucivorus (Linnaeus, 1758) - nominate subspecies, to which the name 'wart-biter' belongs.

== Habitat ==
The species is found in calcareous grassland and heathland habitats.

Wart-biters need a mosaic of vegetation, including bare ground/short turf, grass tussocks, and a sward rich in flowering herbs. They prefer areas that are not heavily grazed. The species is thermophilous, and tends to occur on sites with a southerly aspect.

== Diet ==
Wart-biters are omnivores. Plants eaten include knapweed, nettles, bedstraws; the species also eats insects, including grasshoppers.

== Life cycle ==
The wart-biter lays its eggs in the soil; these eggs normally hatch after two winters. It then passes through seven instar stages between April and June. The adult stage is reached in the beginning of July. Wart-biter populations peak in late July and early August. Newly hatched Decticus are encased in a sheath to facilitate their trip to the soil surface, the sheath holding the legs and antennae safely against the body while burrowing upwards. A neck which can in turn be inflated and deflated, enlarges the top of its tunnel, easing its passage upwards.

== Status and distribution ==
This species occurs throughout continental Europe, except the extreme south, ranging from southern Scandinavia to Portugal, Spain, Italy, and Greece. It is also found in temperate Asia, as far east as China. Geographic features such as mountains have fragmented the species, leading to a wide range of forms and numerous subspecies.

In Britain, the wart-biter is confined to five sites, two in East Sussex, and one each in Wiltshire, Essex, Dorset and Kent.

== Conservation ==
The population of wart-biters has declined in many areas of northern Europe. In Britain, it is threatened with extinction. The species is the subject of a United Kingdom Biodiversity Action Plan.

== Bibliography ==
- Westwood, Brett; Moss, Stephen (2017). Wonderland: a year of Britain's wildlife, day by day. John Murray Publishers. ISBN 978-1-473-60924-2.
