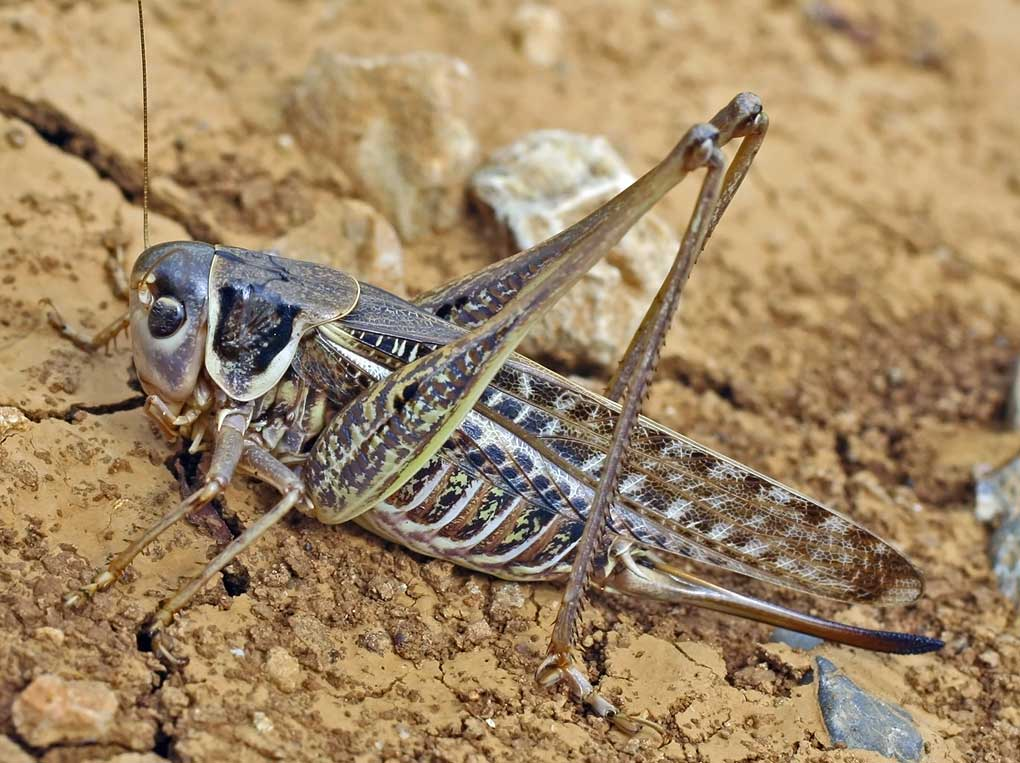
- Female

Scientific classification
- Kingdom: Animalia
- Phylum: Arthropoda
- Clade: Pancrustacea
- Class: Insecta
- Order: Orthoptera
- Suborder: Ensifera
- Family: Tettigoniidae
- Genus: Decticus
- Species: D. albifrons

Binomial name
- Decticus albifrons (Fabricius, 1775)

= Decticus albifrons =

Species of cricket-like animal

Video of Decticus albifrons

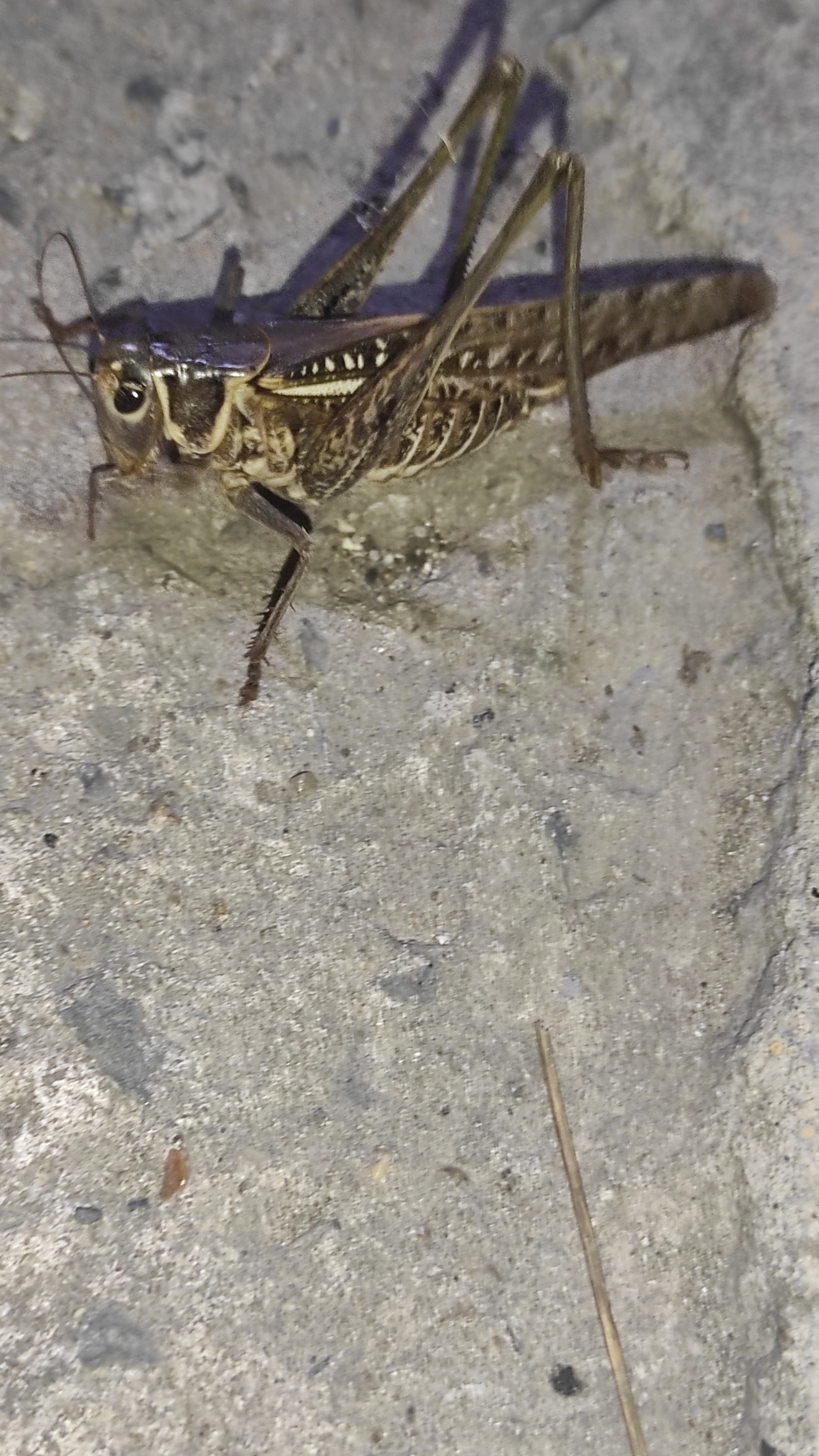
A specimen of insect caught at night

Decticus albifrons, the southern wartbiter, is a species of katydid in the subfamily Tettigoniinae. It is found in Southern Europe
