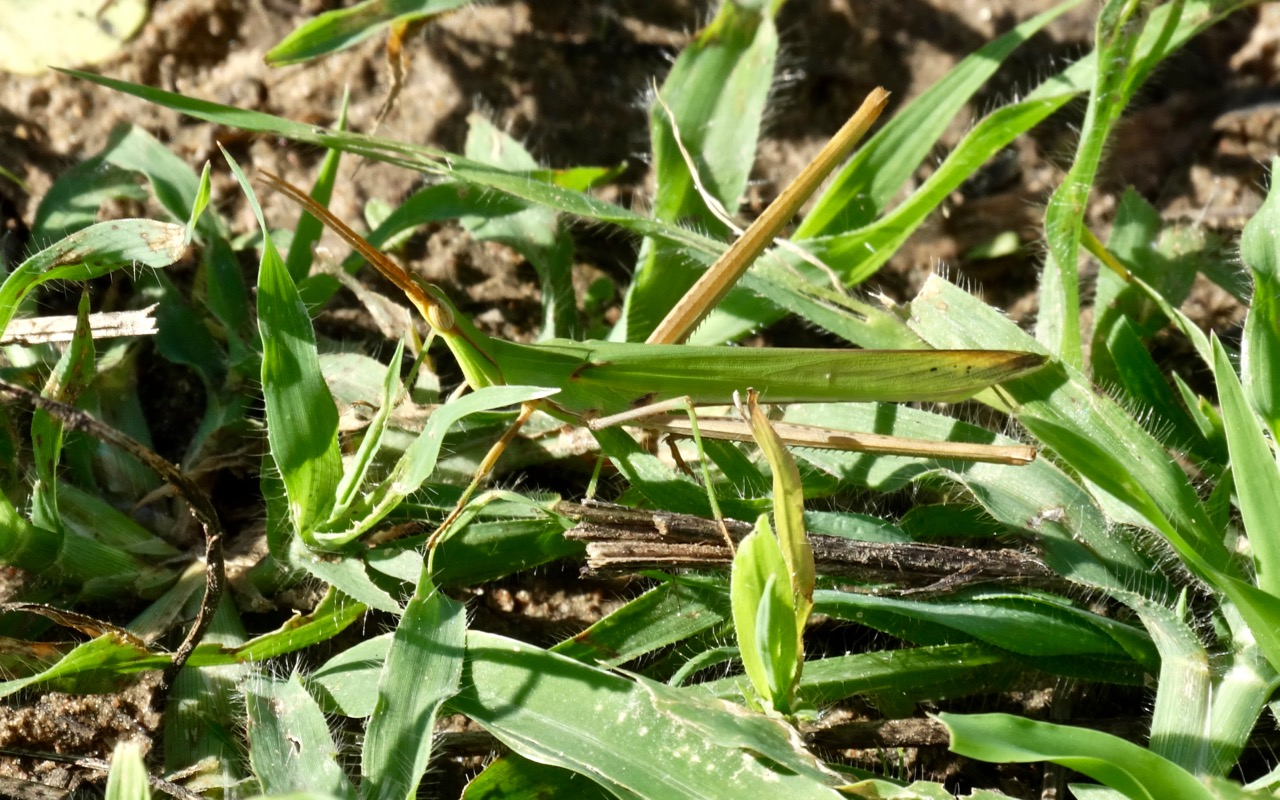
- Male Acrida bicolor photographed near Gnibi, Senegal

Scientific classification
- Domain: Eukaryota
- Kingdom: Animalia
- Phylum: Arthropoda
- Class: Insecta
- Order: Orthoptera
- Suborder: Caelifera
- Family: Acrididae
- Subfamily: Acridinae
- Tribe: Acridini
- Genus: Acrida
- Species: A. bicolor

Binomial name
- Acrida bicolor (Thunberg, 1815)

= Acrida bicolor =

Species of insect

Acrida bicolor is a grasshopper species in the Acrididae family. It is found in Africa, the Middle East, and southern Europe.
