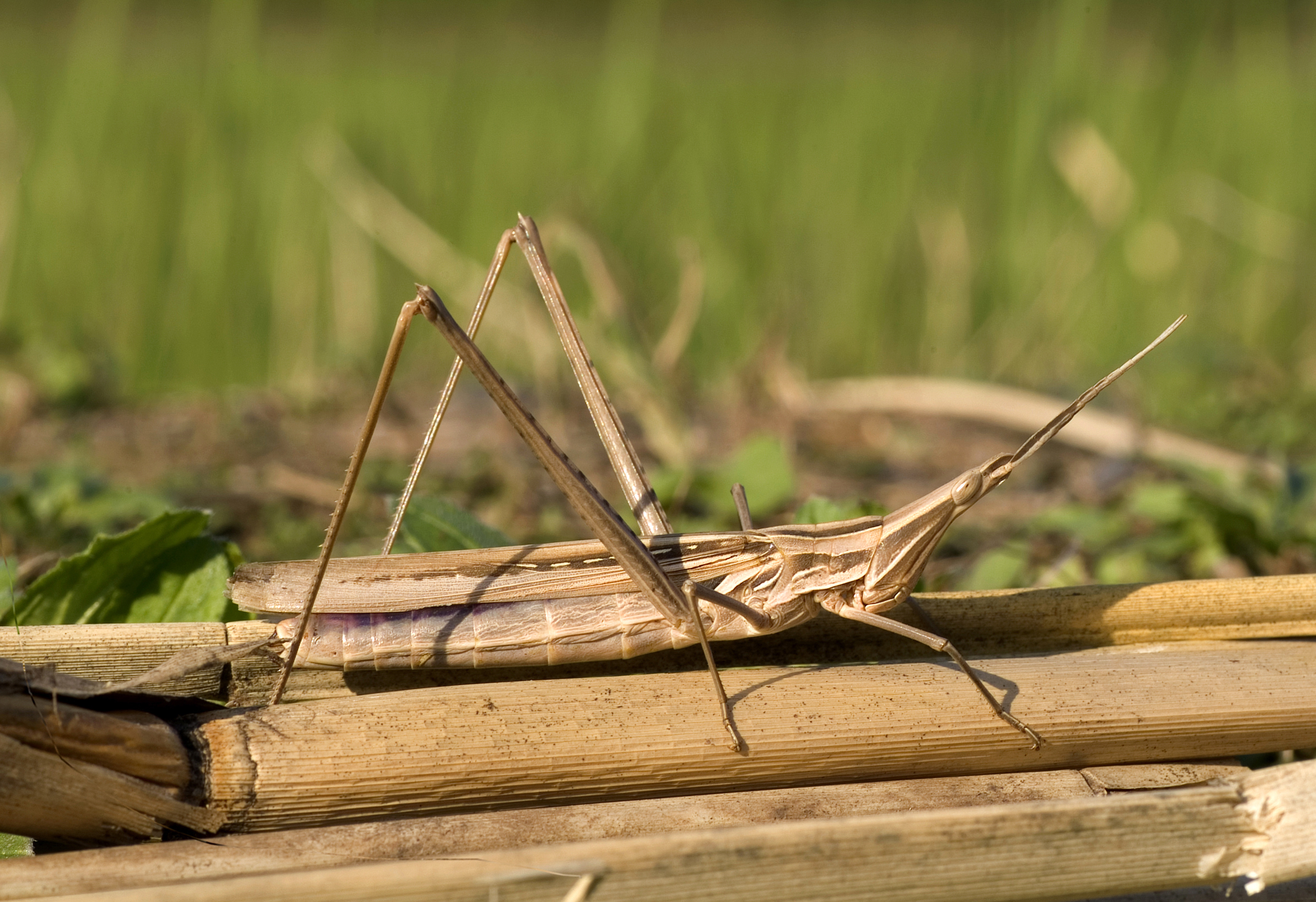

Scientific classification
- Kingdom: Animalia
- Phylum: Arthropoda
- Class: Insecta
- Order: Orthoptera
- Suborder: Caelifera
- Family: Acrididae
- Subfamily: Acridinae
- Tribe: Acridini
- Genus: Acrida
- Species: A. cinerea

Binomial name
- Acrida cinerea (Thunberg, 1815)

Synonyms
- Acrida antennata Mistshenko, 1951; Acrida cinerea subsp. cinerea (Thunberg, 1815); Acrida csikii Bolívar, 1901; Acrida koreana Ikonnikov, 1913; Acrida lata Motschulsky, 1866; Truxalis chinensis Westwood, 1838; Truxalis cinereus Thunberg, 1815; Truxalis unicolor Thunberg, 1815

= Acrida cinerea =

Species of insect

Acrida cinerea, sometimes called the Oriental longheaded grasshopper/locust or the Chinese grasshopper though this name is also applied to Oxya chinensis, is a member of the Acrididae family. Like other members of the genus Acrida, Acrida cinerea lacks stridulatory organs on its legs and so they do not make noise while moving.

Acrida cinerea, like other Acrida species, is a pest of many agricultural crops. It is found throughout China, Korea, Japan, South East Asia and Indonesia.

Historically it has been used as a human food source, and it has been investigated for its nutritional value for the poultry industry.

== Description ==
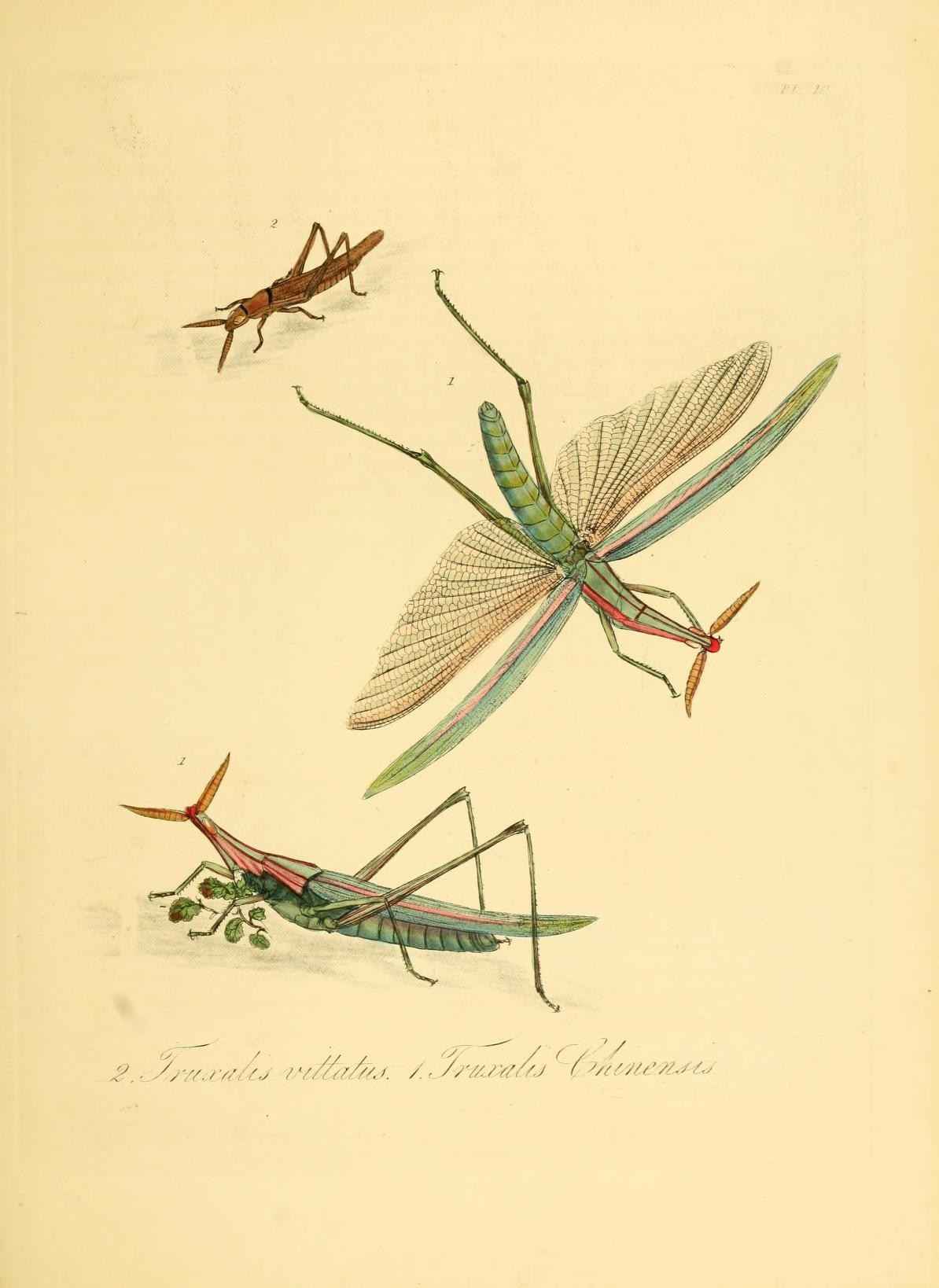
Fig. 1 Illustration of Truxalis chinensis, now known as A. cinerea.

Acrida cinerea males are typically 40–50 mm (1.6–2.0 in) in length while females are 70–80 mm (2.8–3.1 in). They are either green or brown in color with colorless wings. A. cinerea has long legs which allow it to jump long distances.
