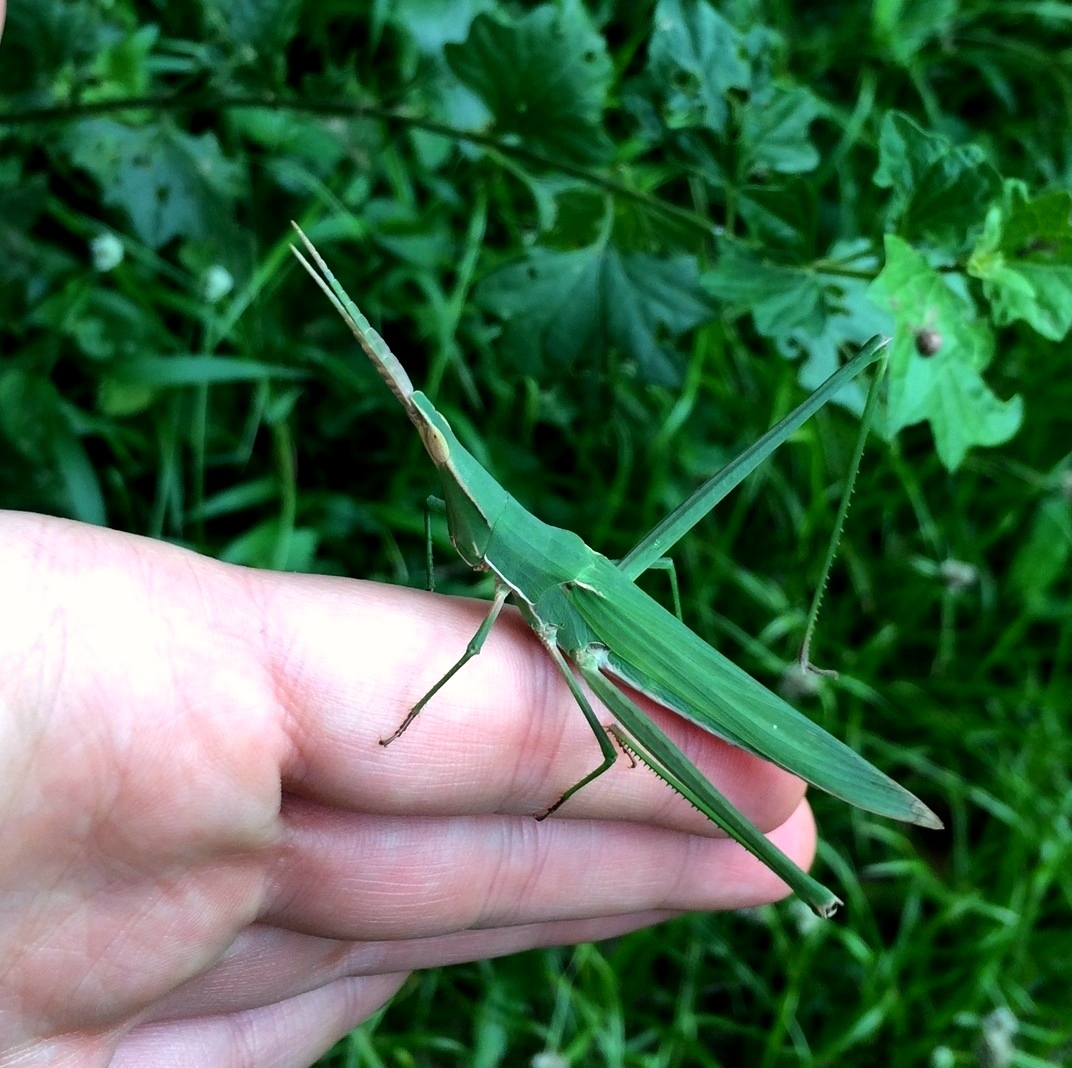
- Acrida acuminata, South Africa

Scientific classification
- Kingdom: Animalia
- Phylum: Arthropoda
- Clade: Pancrustacea
- Class: Insecta
- Order: Orthoptera
- Suborder: Caelifera
- Family: Acrididae
- Subfamily: Acridinae
- Tribe: Acridini
- Genus: Acrida
- Species: A. acuminata

Binomial name
- Acrida acuminata Stål, 1873

= Acrida acuminata =

Species of grasshopper

Acrida acuminata is a species of short-horned grasshopper in the family Acrididae. It is found in the Afrotropics.
