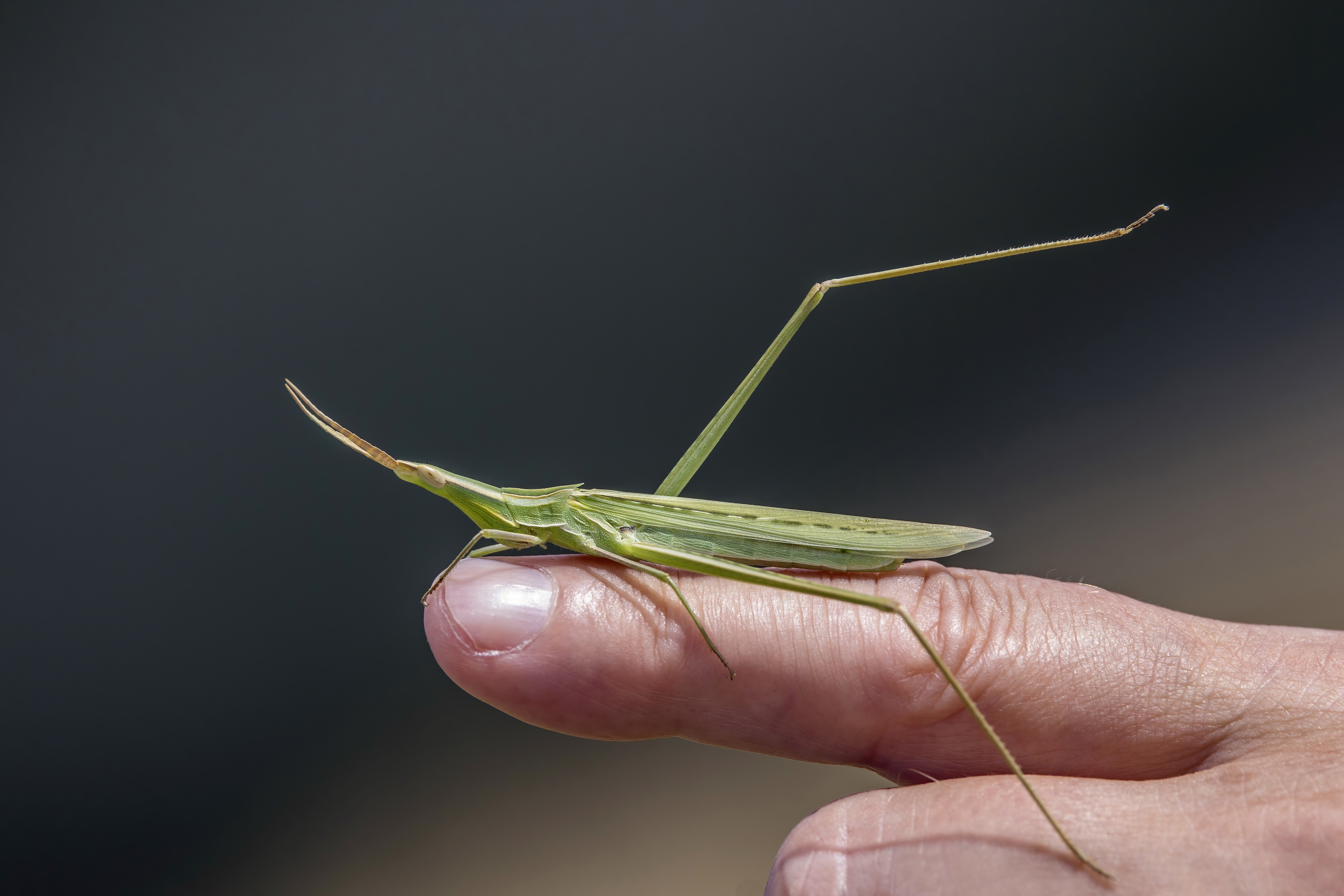
- In Romania

Conservation status
- Least Concern (IUCN 3.1)

Scientific classification
- Kingdom: Animalia
- Phylum: Arthropoda
- Class: Insecta
- Order: Orthoptera
- Suborder: Caelifera
- Family: Acrididae
- Genus: Acrida
- Species: A. ungarica

Binomial name
- Acrida ungarica (Herbst, 1786)
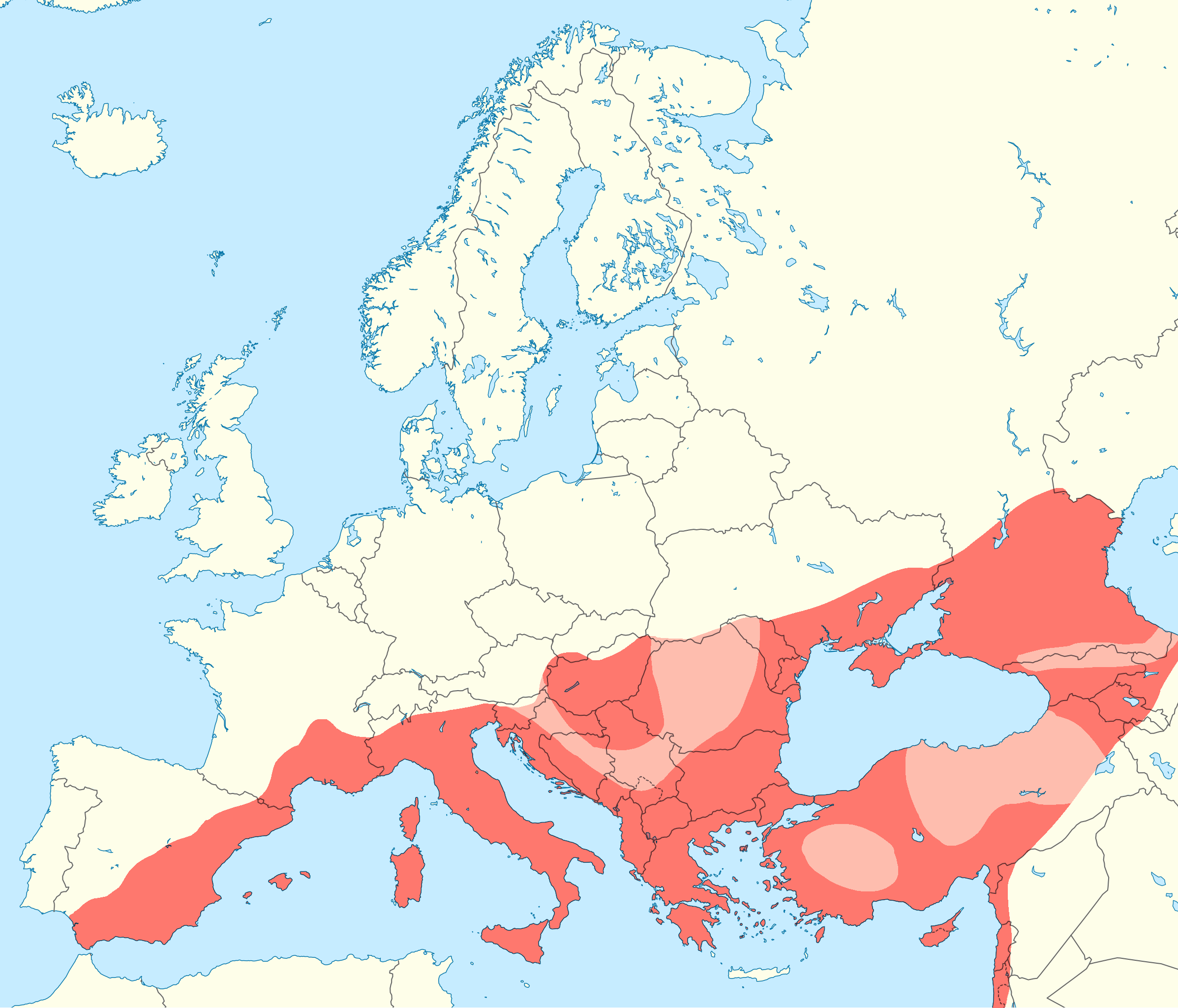

= Acrida ungarica =

Species of grasshopper

Acrida ungarica is a species of grasshopper, typical of the tribe Acridini, found in southern and central Europe. It is commonly known as the (common) cone-headed grasshopper, nosed grasshopper, and Mediterranean slant-faced grasshopper.

Two subspecies are recognized:

- Acrida ungarica mediterranea Dirsh, 1949
- Acrida ungarica ungarica (Herbst, 1786)

== Gallery ==
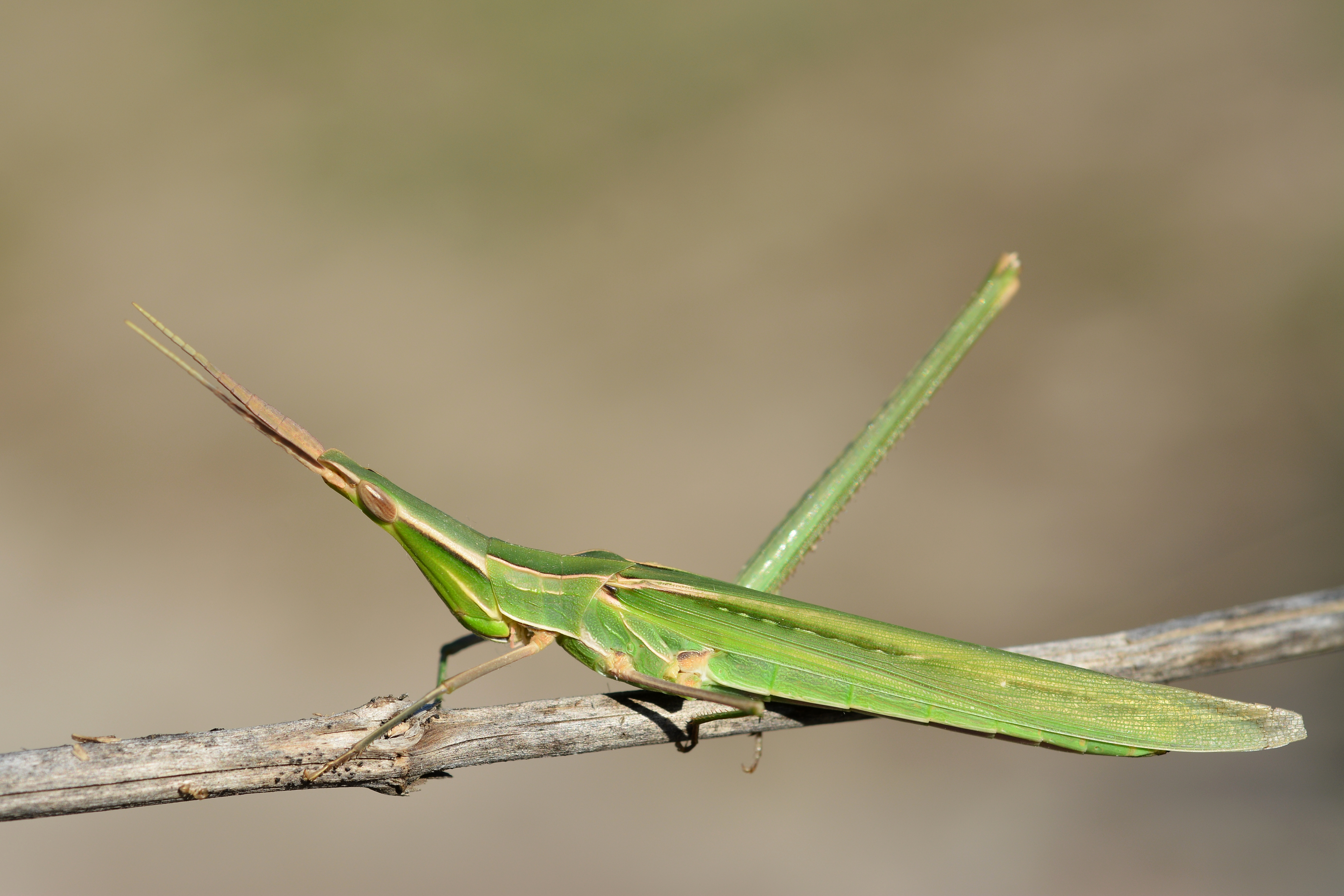

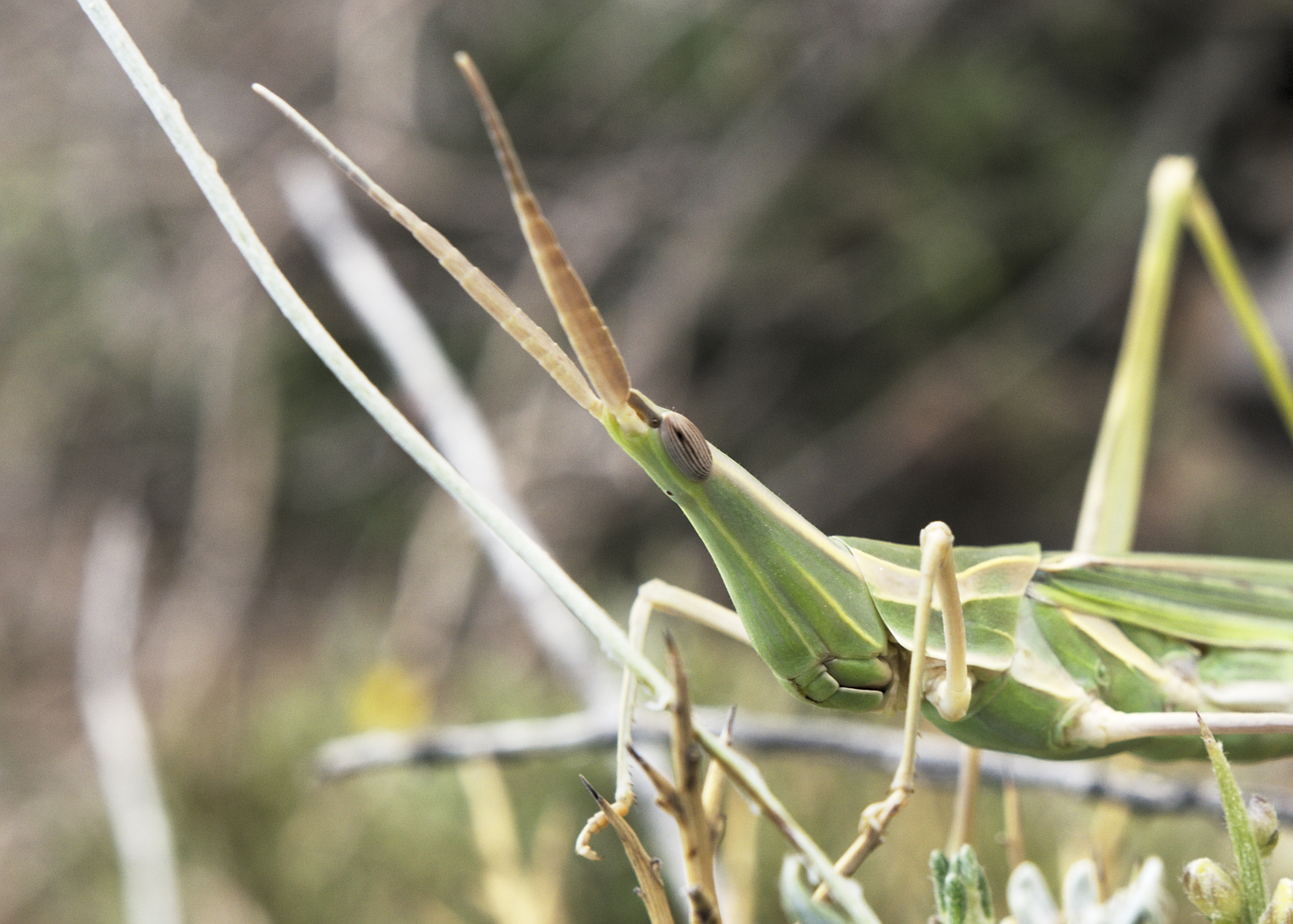

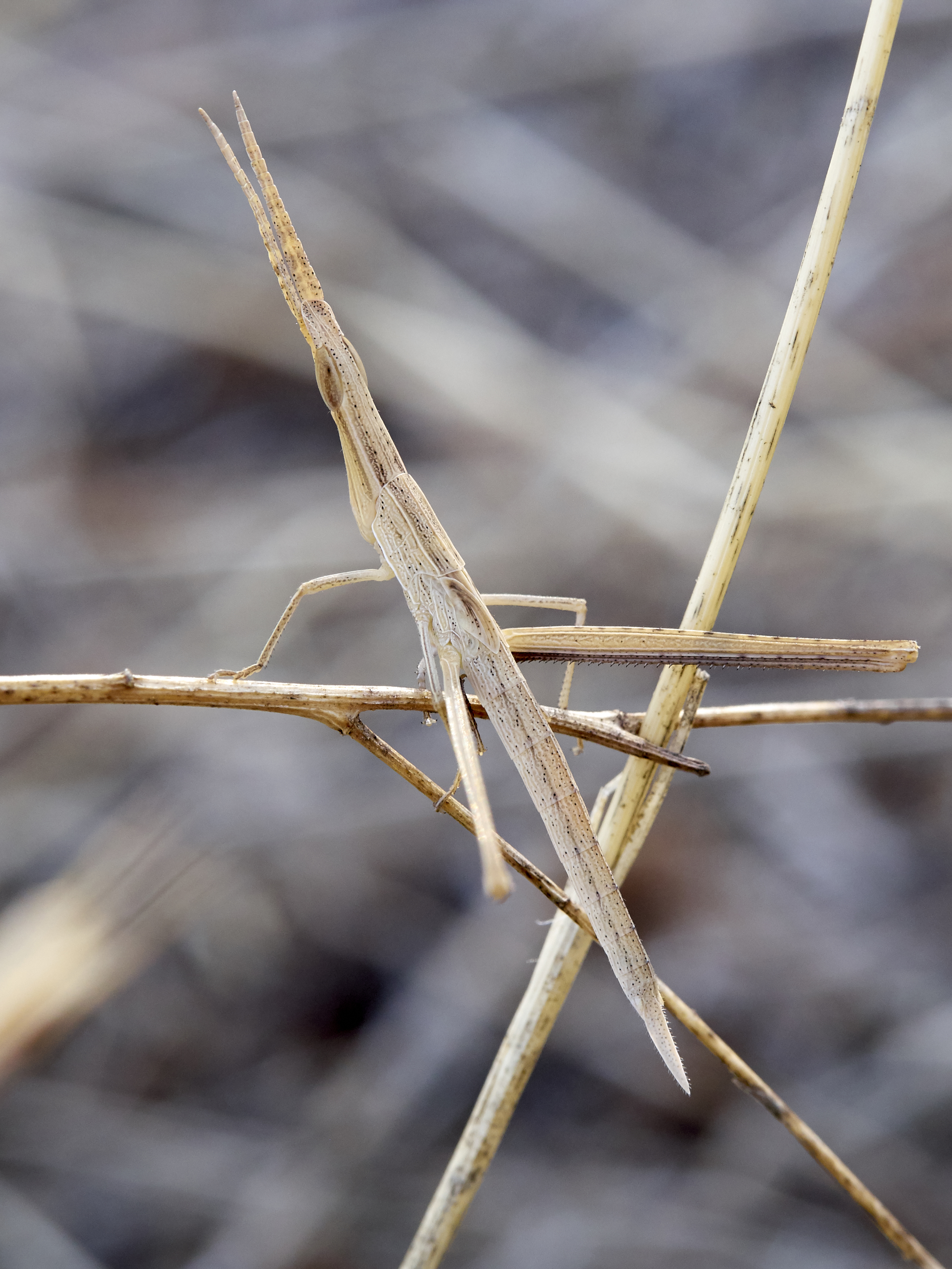
Nymph

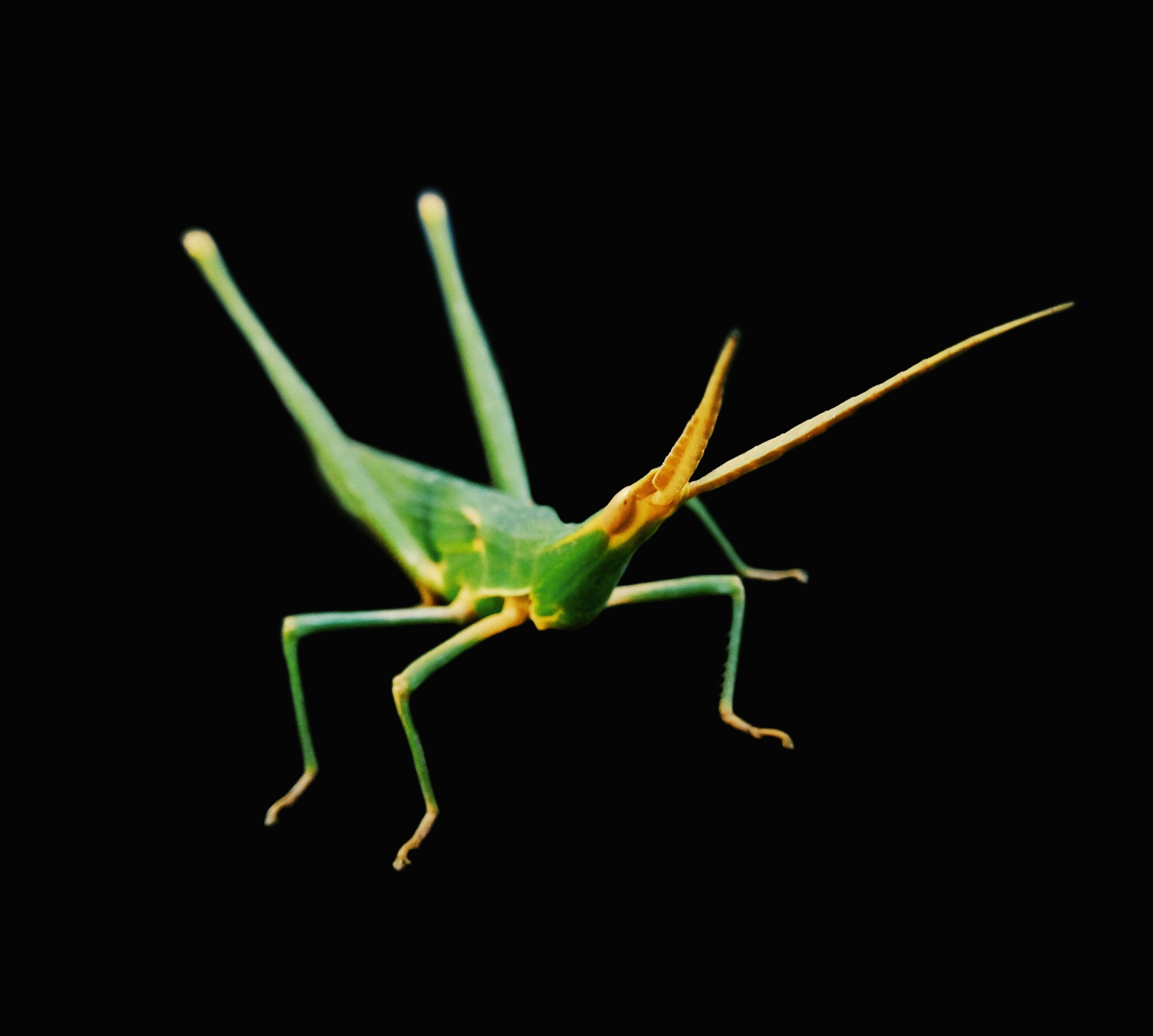
Acrida ungarica isolated
