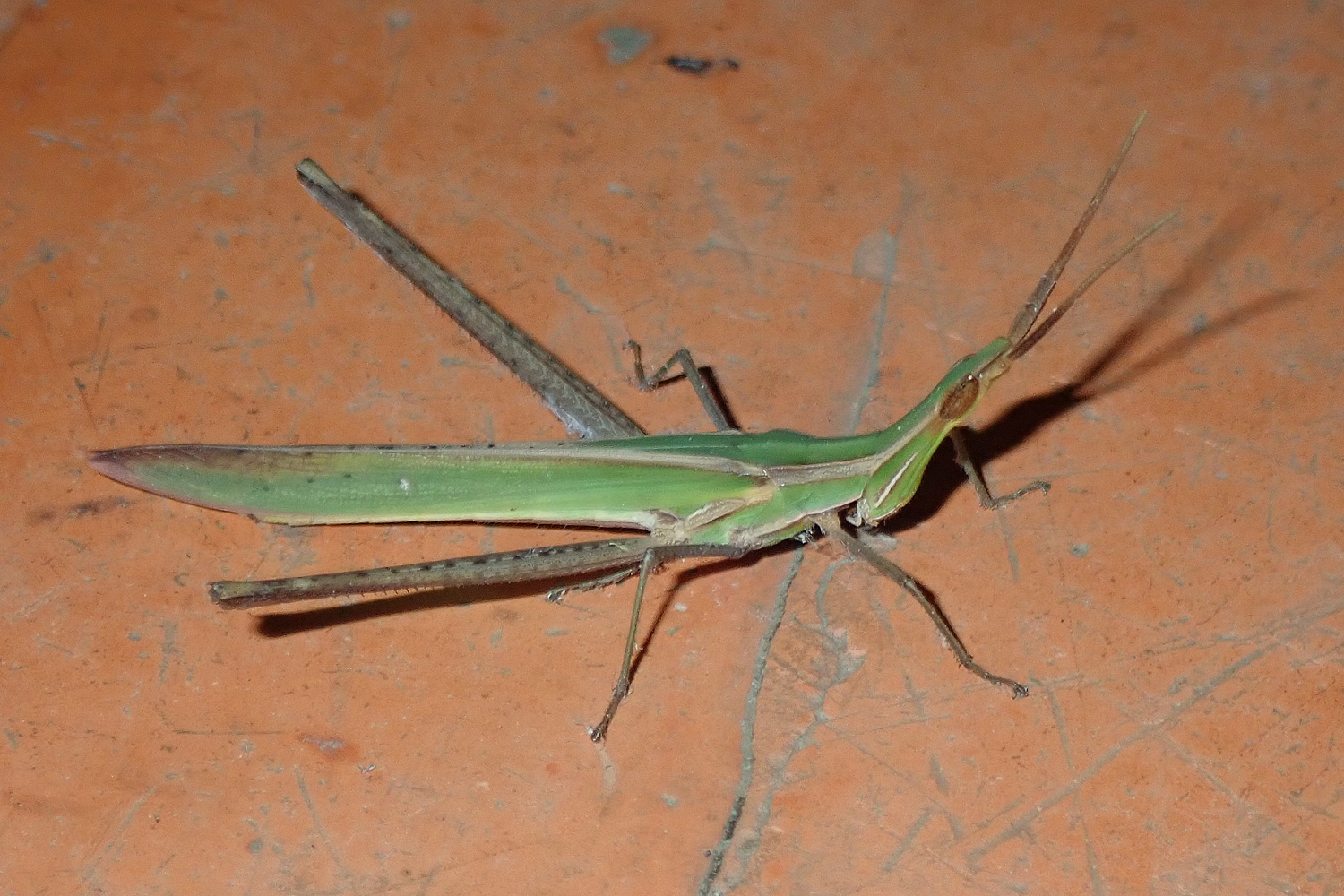
- Acrida willemsii Cat Tien National Park

Scientific classification
- Kingdom: Animalia
- Phylum: Arthropoda
- Class: Insecta
- Order: Orthoptera
- Suborder: Caelifera
- Family: Acrididae
- Subfamily: Acridinae
- Tribe: Acridini
- Genus: Acrida
- Species: A. willemsei

Binomial name
- Acrida willemsei Dirsh, 1954

Synonyms
- Acrida cinerea willemsei (Dirsh, 1954)

= Acrida willemsei =

Species of grasshopper

Acrida willemsei is an Asian species of grasshopper in the subfamily Acridinae. The recorded distribution of this species includes southern China, Taiwan, Indo-China, India and Malesia. It was first described in 1954.
