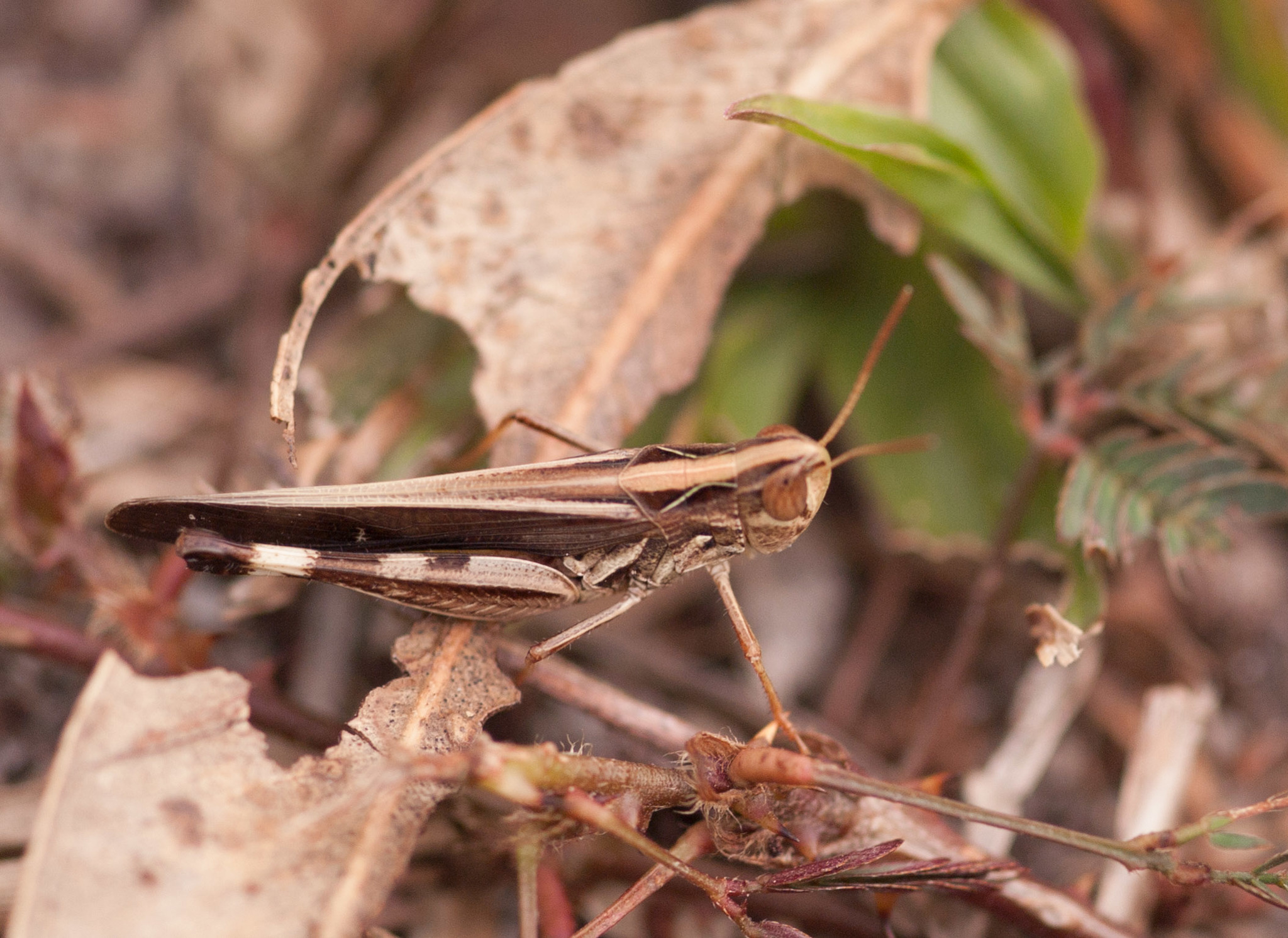
- Caledia captiva, caledia, Australia

Scientific classification
- Kingdom: Animalia
- Phylum: Arthropoda
- Clade: Pancrustacea
- Class: Insecta
- Order: Orthoptera
- Suborder: Caelifera
- Family: Acrididae
- Subfamily: Acridinae
- Tribe: Acridini
- Genus: Caledia
- Species: C. captiva

Binomial name
- Caledia captiva (Fabricius, 1775)

= Caledia captiva =

Species of grasshopper

Caledia captiva, the caledia, is a species of silent slant-faced grasshopper in the family Acrididae. It is found in Australia.
