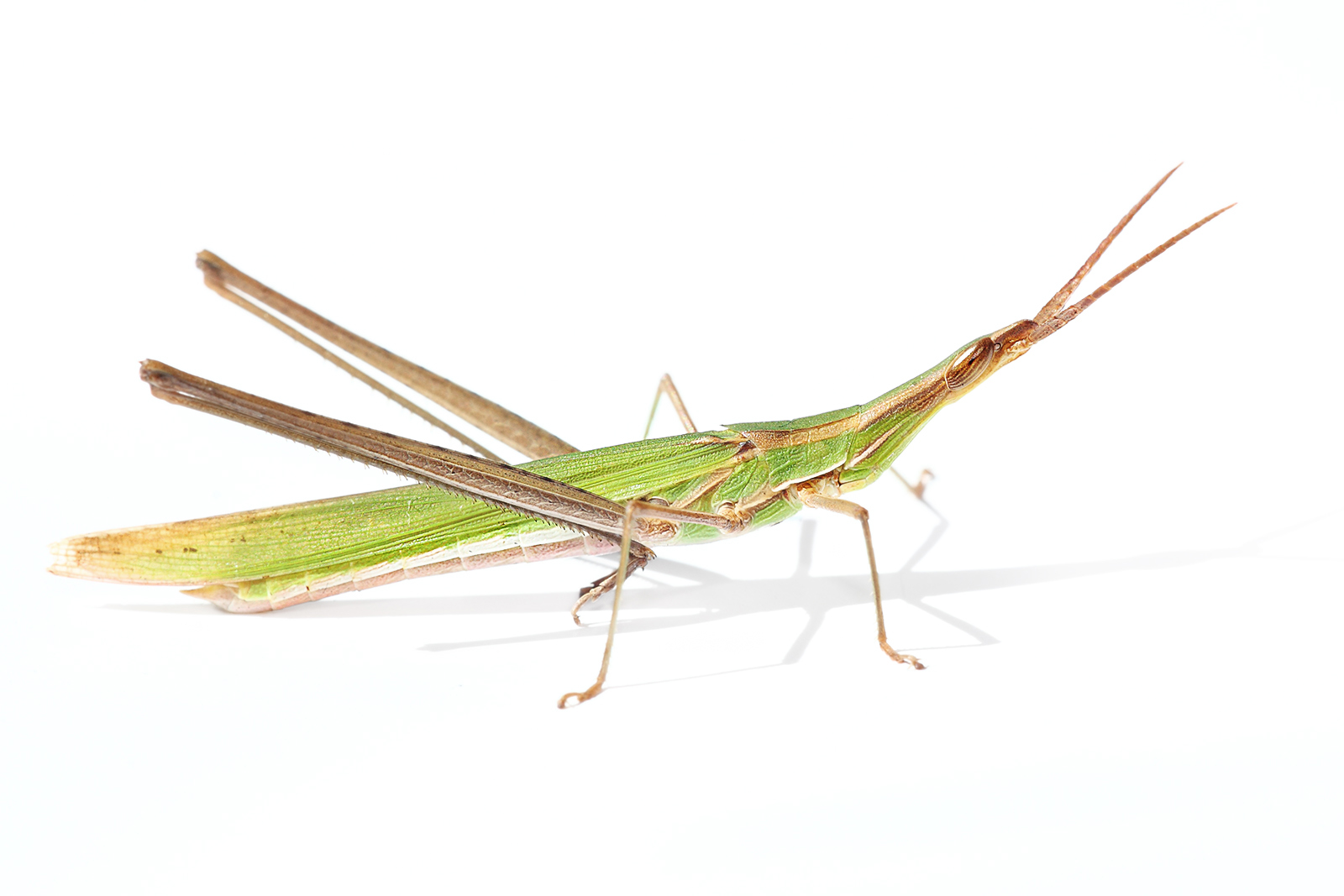
- Acrida conica

Scientific classification
- Kingdom: Animalia
- Phylum: Arthropoda
- Class: Insecta
- Order: Orthoptera
- Suborder: Caelifera
- Superfamily: Acridoidea
- Family: Acrididae
- Subfamily: Acridinae
- Tribe: Acridini
- Genus: Acrida; Linnaeus, 1758

Type species
- Gryllus turritus Linnaeus, 1758

= Acrida =

Genus of grasshoppers

Acrida is a genus of grasshoppers in the family Acrididae. The genus contains around 40 species which are found in Africa, Europe, Asia, North America, Hawaii, and Australia. Insects of this genus are omnivorous and a well-known pest of many agricultural crops.

== Species ==
As of 2018, the Orthoptera Species File accepted the following species:

1. Acrida acuminata Stål, 1873
2. Acrida anatolica Dirsh, 1949
3. Acrida bara Steinmann, 1963
4. Acrida bhoramdevi Gupta & Chandra, 2018
5. Acrida bicolor (Thunberg, 1815)
6. Acrida cinerea (Thunberg, 1815)
7. Acrida confusa Dirsh, 1954
8. Acrida conica (Fabricius, 1781)
9. Acrida coronata Steinmann, 1963
10. Acrida crassicollis Chopard, 1921
11. Acrida crida Steinmann, 1963
12. Acrida curticnema Liu, 1981
13. Acrida exaltata (Walker, 1859)
14. Acrida excentrica Woznessenskij, 1998
15. Acrida exota Steinmann, 1963
16. Acrida formosana Steinmann, 1963
17. Acrida fumata Steinmann, 1963
18. Acrida gigantea (Herbst, 1786)
19. Acrida granulata Mistshenko, 1951
20. Acrida gyarosi Steinmann, 1963
21. Acrida herbacea Bolívar, 1922
22. Acrida hsiai Steinmann, 1963
23. Acrida incallida Mistshenko, 1951
24. Acrida indica Dirsh, 1954
25. Acrida kozlovi Mistshenko, 1951
26. Acrida liangi Woznessenskij, 1998
27. Acrida lineata (Thunberg, 1815)
28. Acrida madecassa (Brancsik, 1892)
29. Acrida maxima Karny, 1907
30. Acrida montana Steinmann, 1963
31. Acrida oxycephala (Pallas, 1771)
32. Acrida propinqua Burr, 1902
33. Acrida raipurensis Gupta & Chandra, 2018
34. Acrida rufipes Steinmann, 1963
35. Acrida shanghaica Steinmann, 1963
36. Acrida subtilis Burr, 1902
37. Acrida sulphuripennis (Gerstaecker, 1869)
38. Acrida testacea (Thunberg, 1815)
39. Acrida tjiamuica Steinmann, 1963
40. Acrida turrita (Linnaeus, 1758) - type species (as Gryllus turritus L.)
41. Acrida ungarica (Herbst, 1786)
42. Acrida willemsei Dirsh, 1954

== Gallery ==
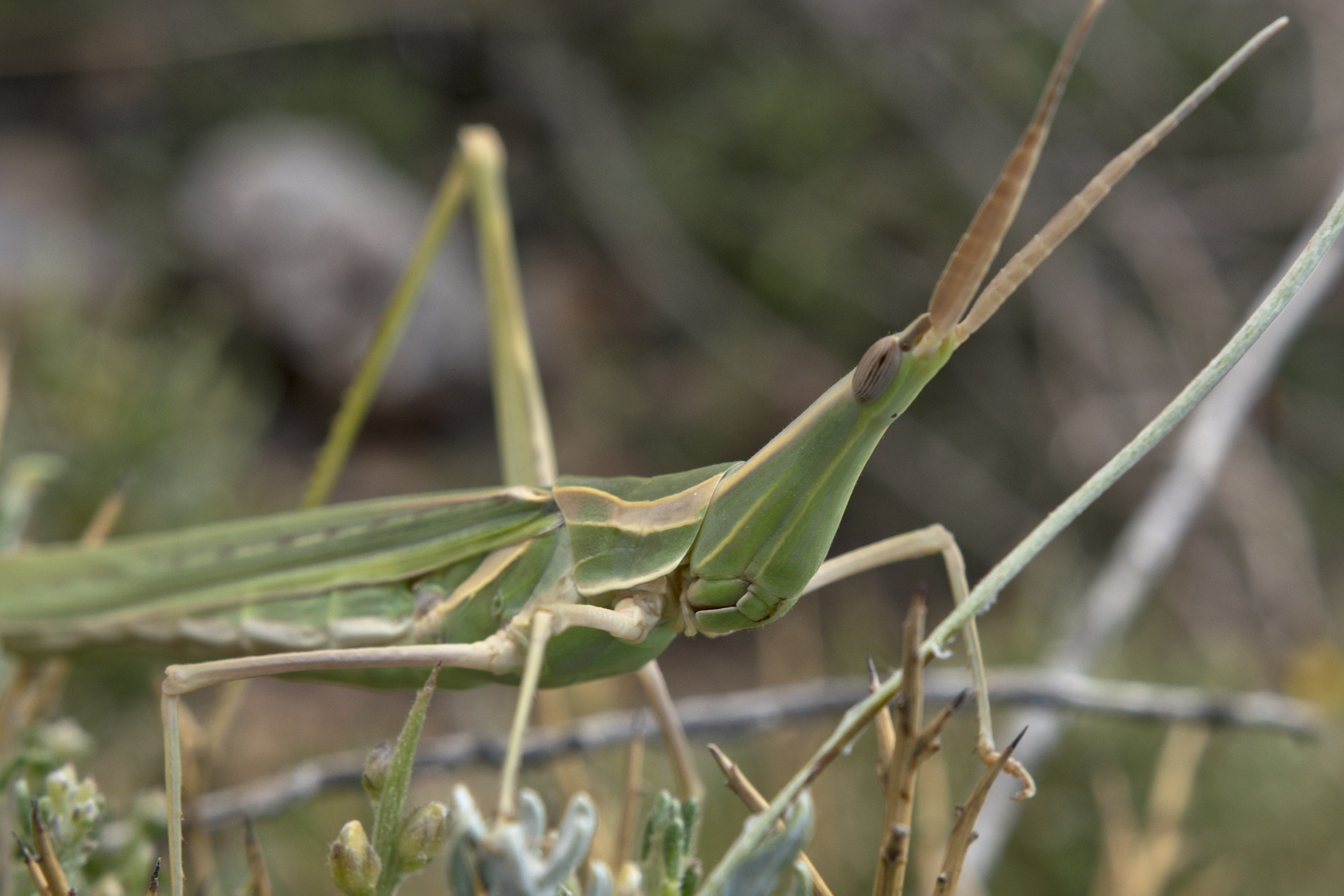
Acrida ungarica

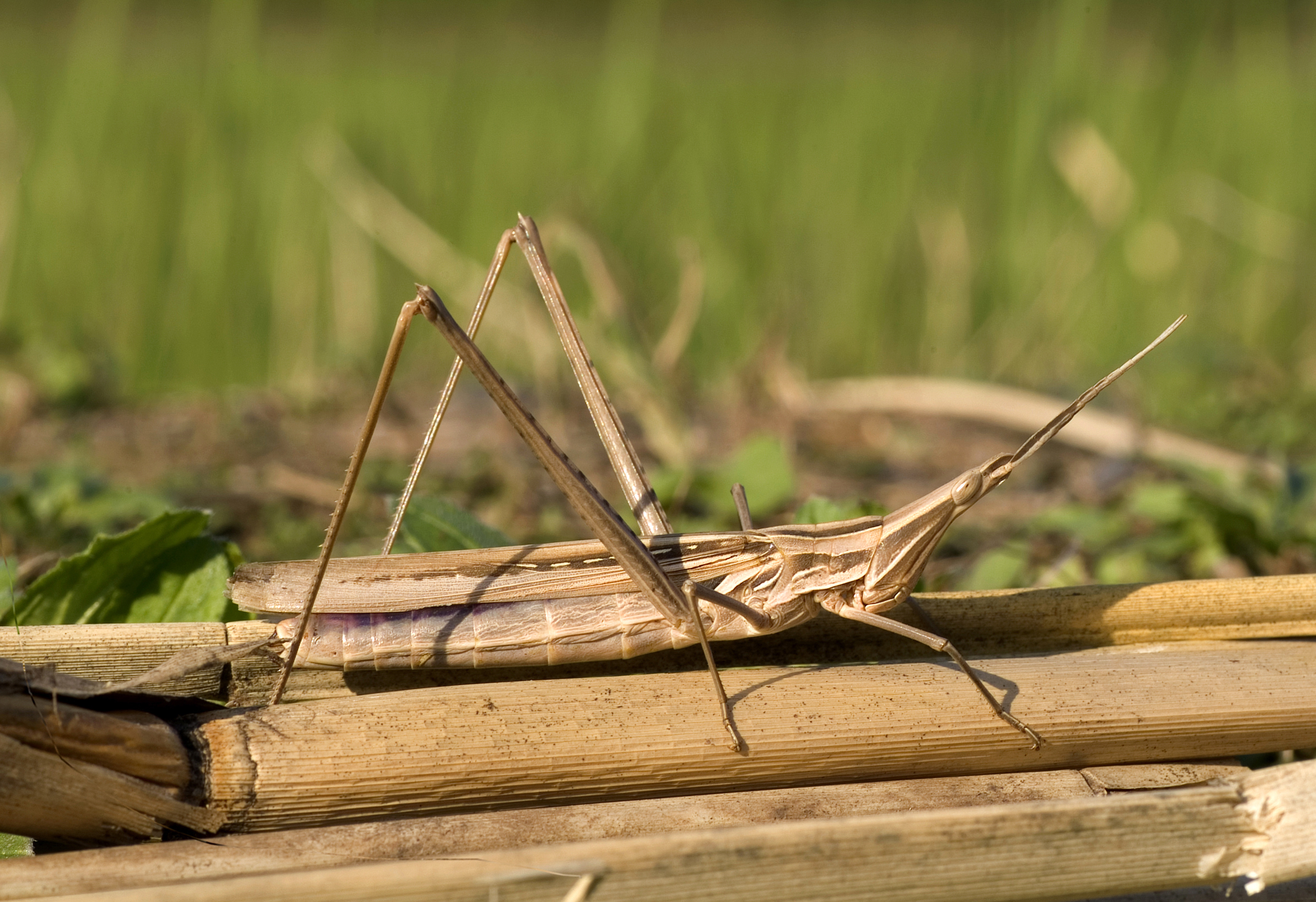
Acrida cinerea

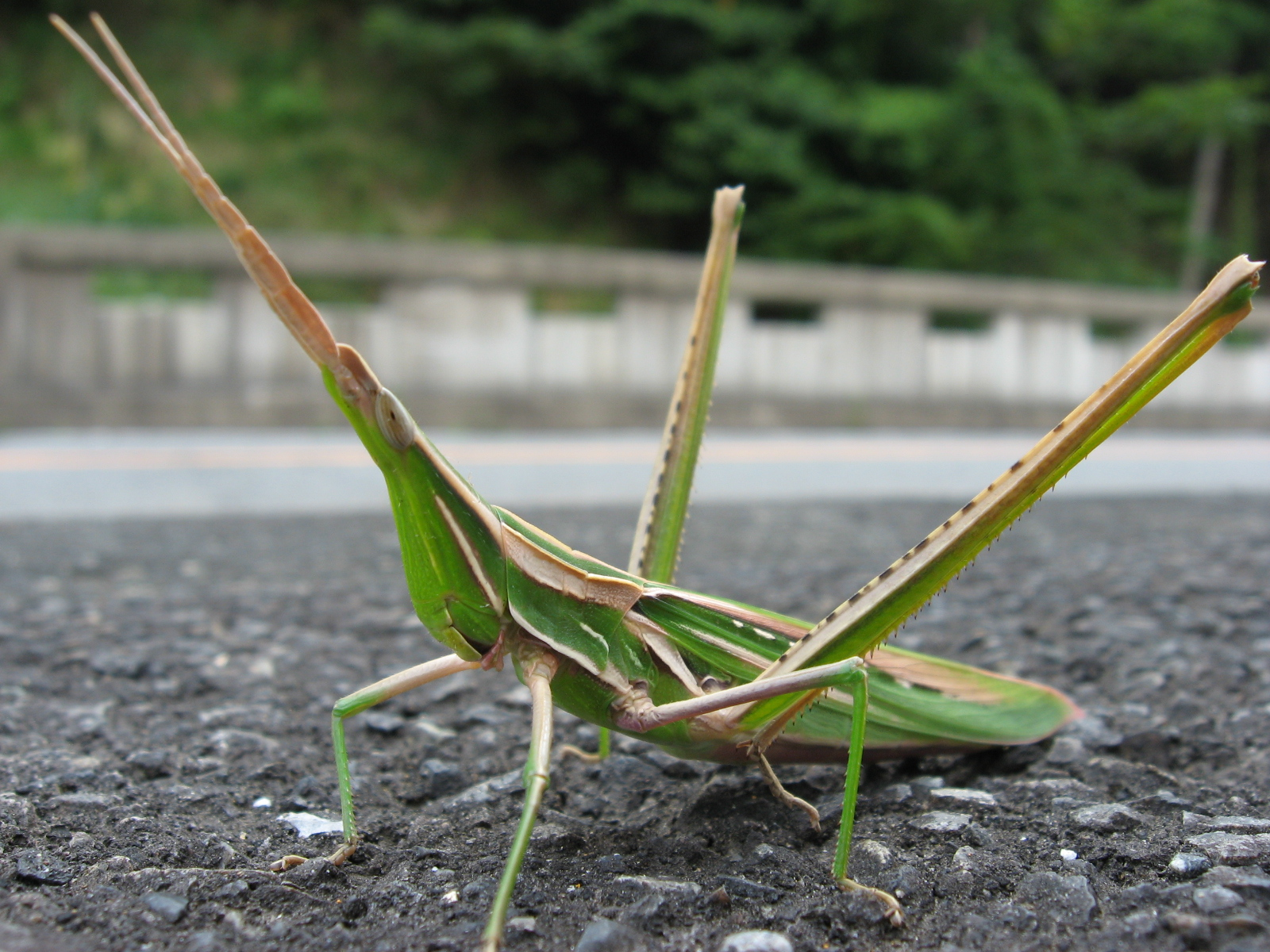
Acrida cinerea

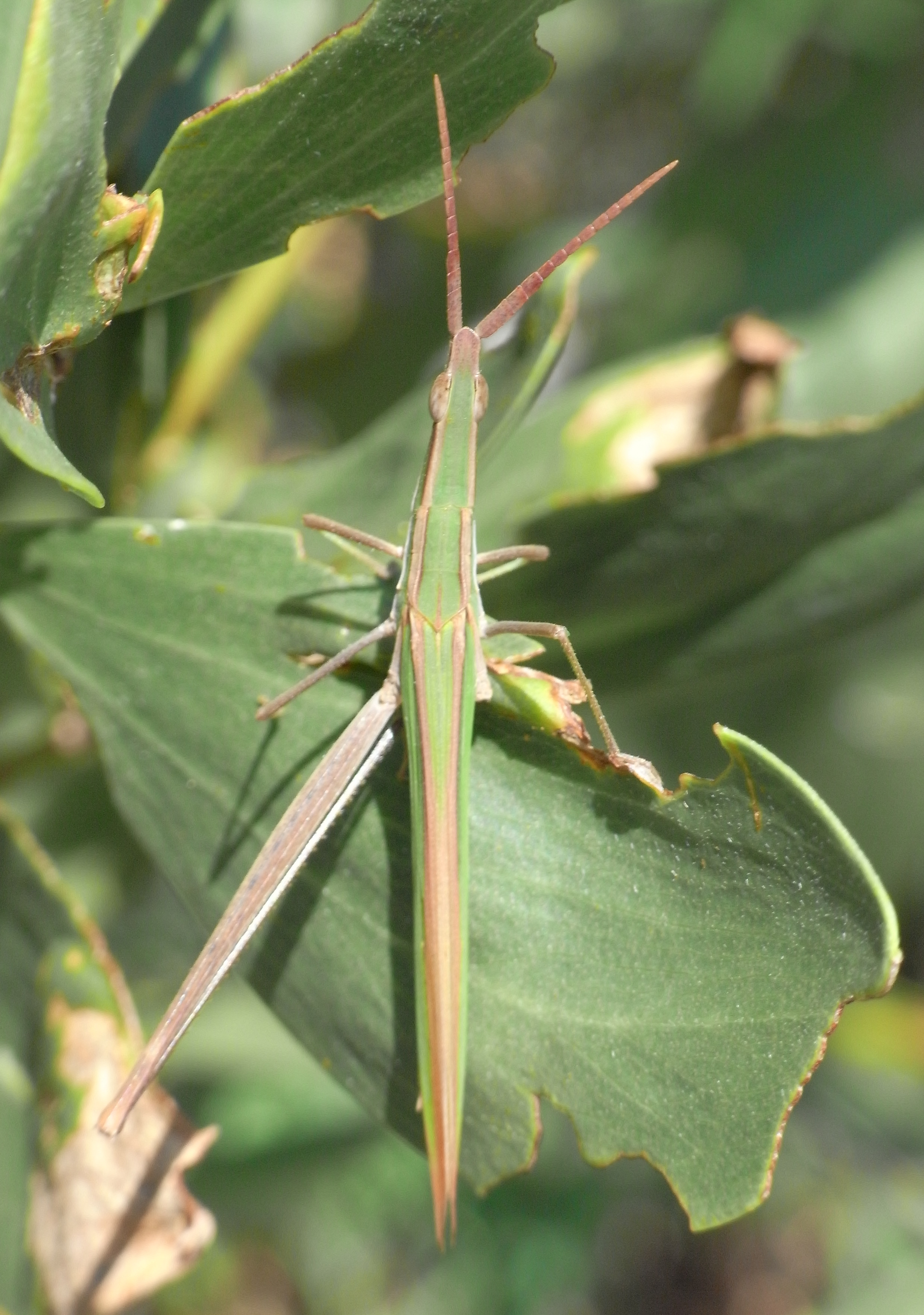
Acrida conica

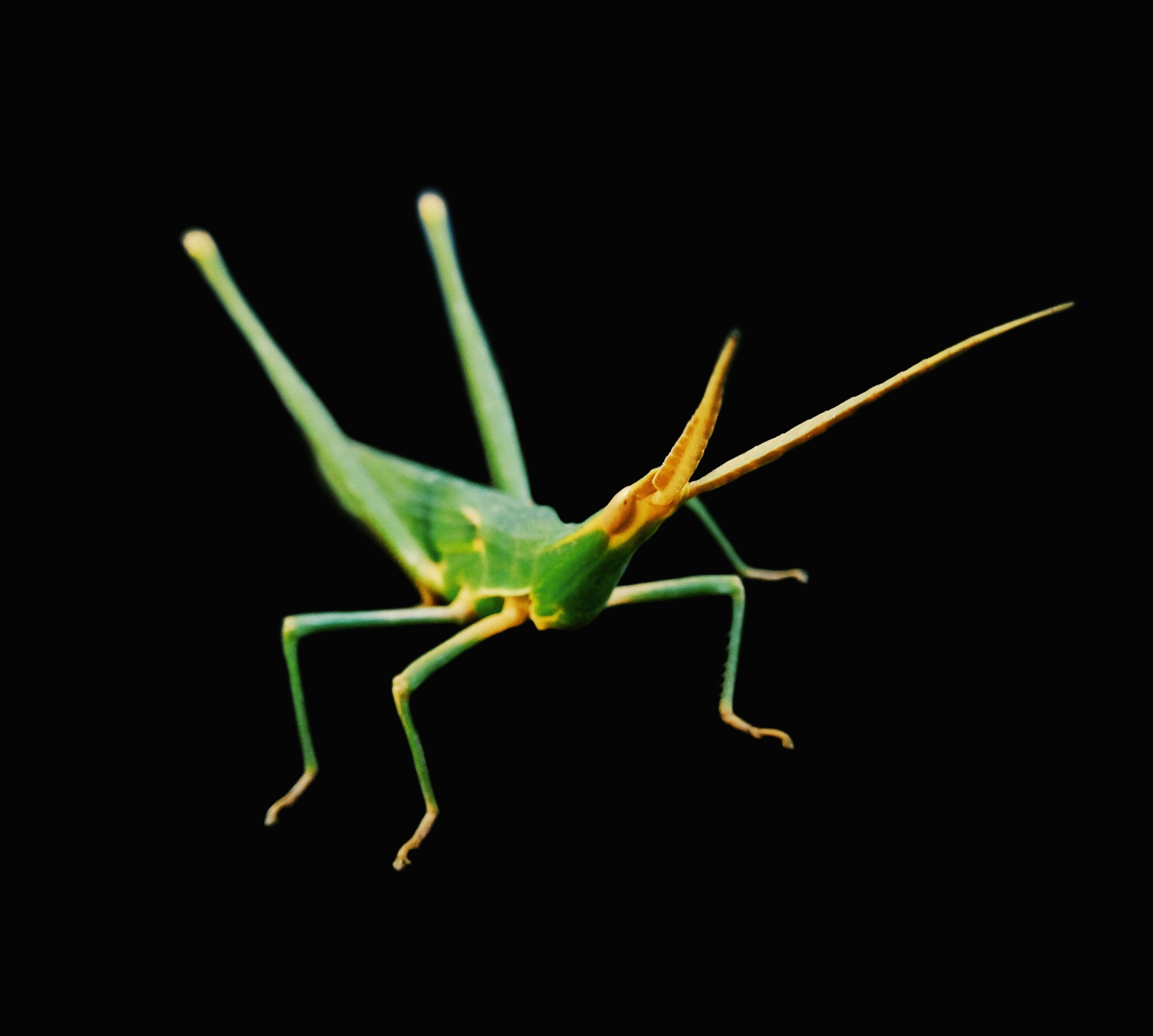
Acrida ungarica
