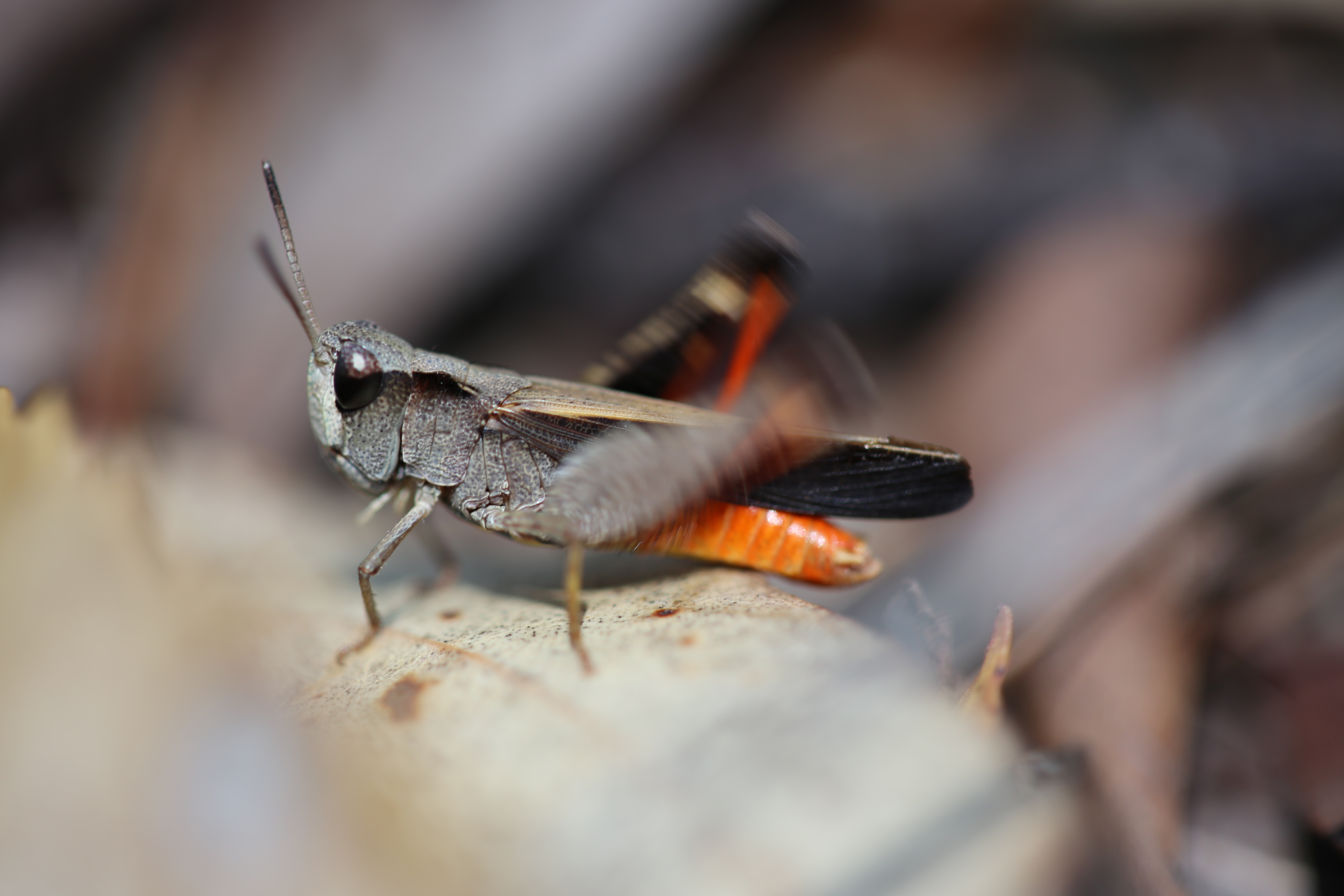
- Cryptobothrus chrysophorus, Golden Bandwing

Scientific classification
- Kingdom: Animalia
- Phylum: Arthropoda
- Clade: Pancrustacea
- Class: Insecta
- Order: Orthoptera
- Suborder: Caelifera
- Family: Acrididae
- Tribe: Acridini
- Genus: Cryptobothrus; Rehn, 1907
- Species: C. chrysophorus

Binomial name
- Cryptobothrus chrysophorus Rehn, 1907

= Cryptobothrus =

Genus of grasshoppers

Cryptobothrus is a genus of short-horned grasshoppers in the family Acrididae. There is one described species in Cryptobothrus, C. chrysophorus, found in Australia.
