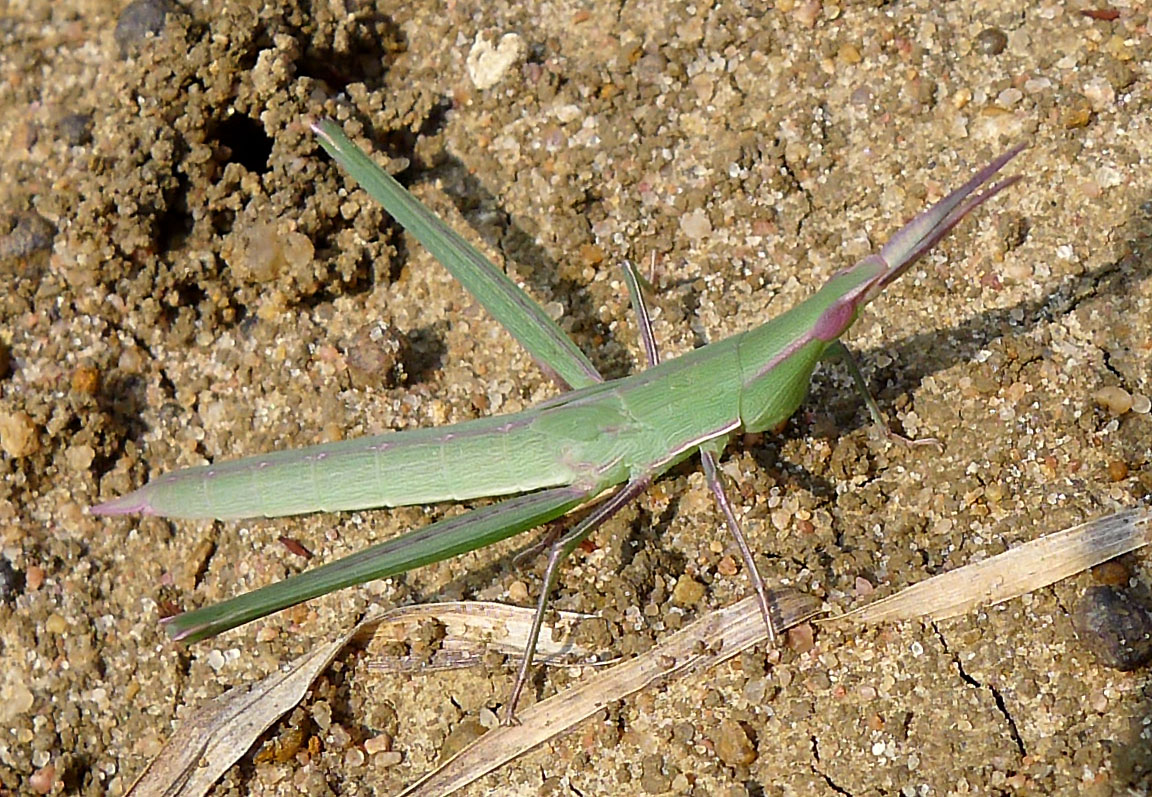

Scientific classification
- Kingdom: Animalia
- Phylum: Arthropoda
- Class: Insecta
- Order: Orthoptera
- Suborder: Caelifera
- Family: Acrididae
- Genus: Acrida
- Species: A. exaltata

Binomial name
- Acrida exaltata (Walker, 1859)

= Acrida exaltata =

Species of grasshopper

Acrida exaltata is a species of grasshopper in the family Acrididae. It is a pest of sorghum in Asia.
