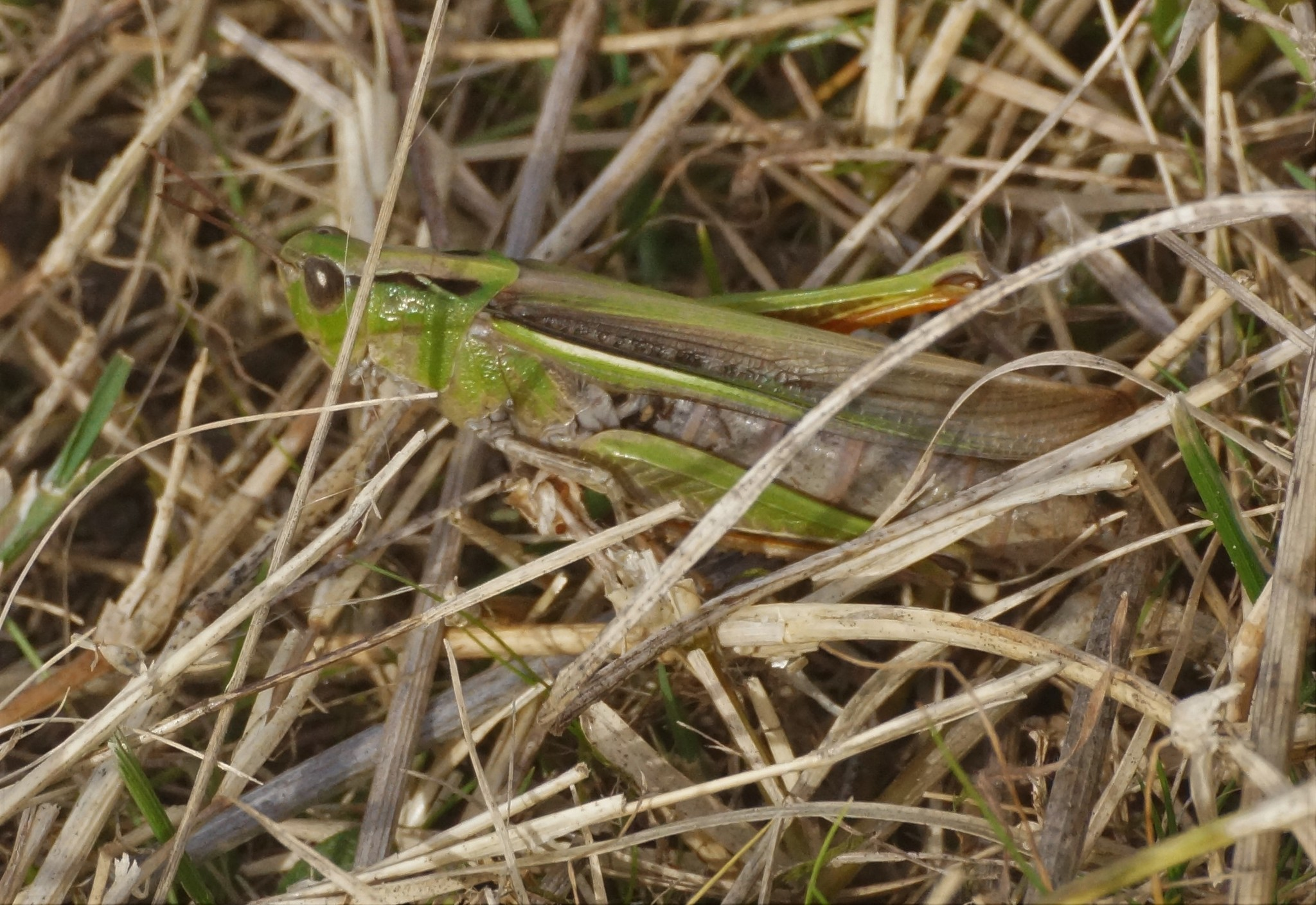
- Schizobothrus flavovittatus, Disappearing Grasshopper, Australia

Scientific classification
- Kingdom: Animalia
- Phylum: Arthropoda
- Clade: Pancrustacea
- Class: Insecta
- Order: Orthoptera
- Suborder: Caelifera
- Family: Acrididae
- Tribe: Acridini
- Genus: Schizobothrus; Sjöstedt, 1921
- Species: S. flavovittatus

Binomial name
- Schizobothrus flavovittatus Sjöstedt, 1921

= Schizobothrus =

Genus of grasshoppers

Schizobothrus is a genus of short-horned grasshoppers in the family Acrididae. There is one described species in Schizobothrus, S. flavovittatus, found in Australia.
