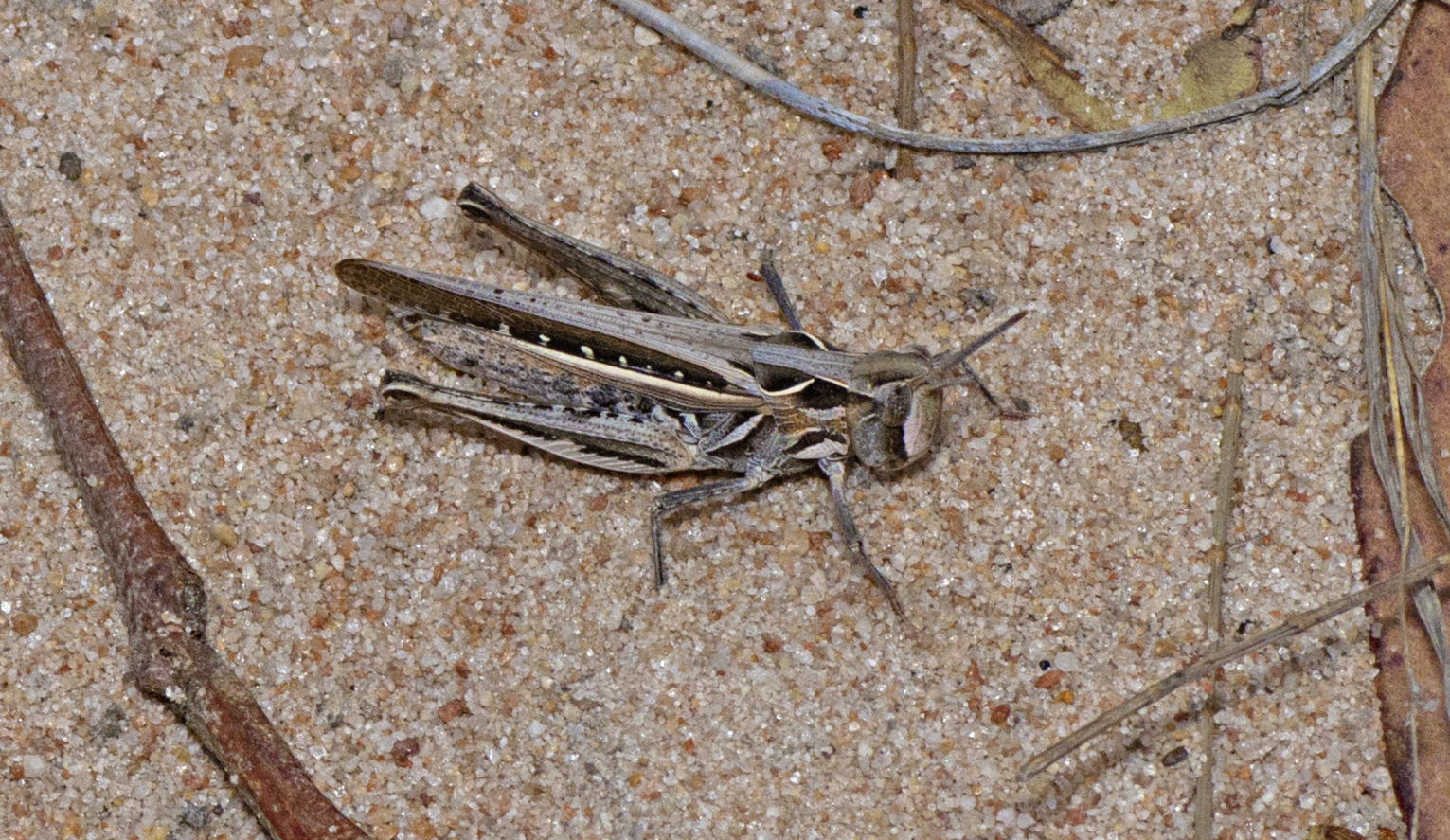
- Froggattina australis, Froggatt's buzzer, Australia

Scientific classification
- Kingdom: Animalia
- Phylum: Arthropoda
- Clade: Pancrustacea
- Class: Insecta
- Order: Orthoptera
- Suborder: Caelifera
- Family: Acrididae
- Tribe: Acridini
- Genus: Froggattina; Tillyard, 1926
- Species: F. australis

Binomial name
- Froggattina australis (Walker, 1870)

= Froggattina =

Genus of grasshoppers

Froggattina is a genus of short-horned grasshoppers in the family Acrididae. There is one described species in Froggattina, F. australis. It is found in Australia.
