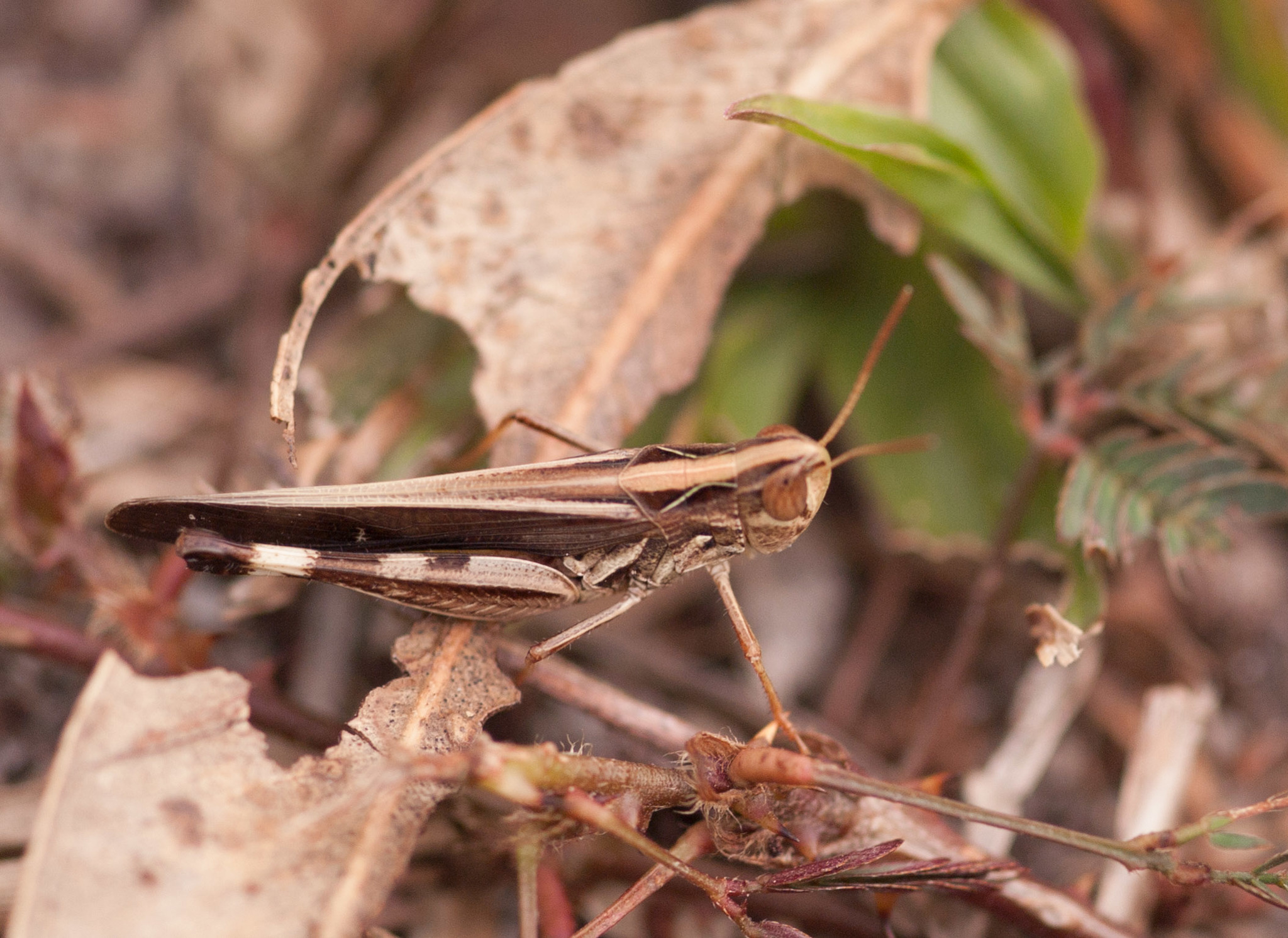
- Caledia captiva, caledia, Australia

Scientific classification
- Kingdom: Animalia
- Phylum: Arthropoda
- Clade: Pancrustacea
- Class: Insecta
- Order: Orthoptera
- Suborder: Caelifera
- Family: Acrididae
- Tribe: Acridini
- Genus: Caledia; Bolívar, 1914
- Species: C. captiva

Binomial name
- Caledia captiva (Fabricius, 1775)

= Caledia =

Genus of grasshoppers

Caledia is a genus of silent slant-faced grasshoppers in the family Acrididae. There is at least one described species in Caledia, C. captiva, found in Australia.
