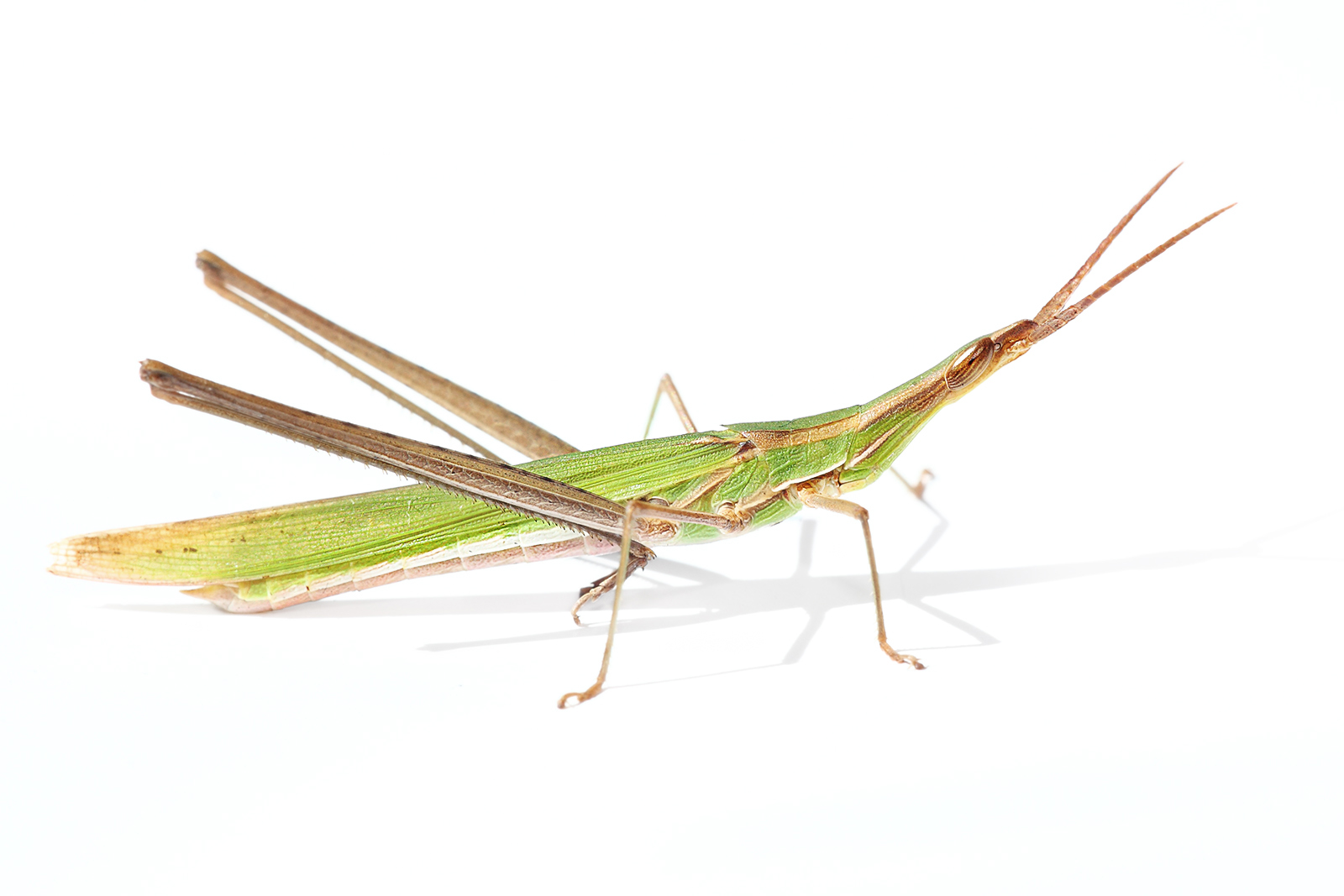
- In Melbourne, Australia

Scientific classification
- Domain: Eukaryota
- Kingdom: Animalia
- Phylum: Arthropoda
- Class: Insecta
- Order: Orthoptera
- Suborder: Caelifera
- Family: Acrididae
- Genus: Acrida
- Species: A. conica

Binomial name
- Acrida conica (Fabricius, 1781)

= Acrida conica =

Species of grasshopper

Acrida conica, the giant green slantface, is a species of grasshopper found in Australia and New Guinea. It was originally described in 1781 as Truxalis conicus.
