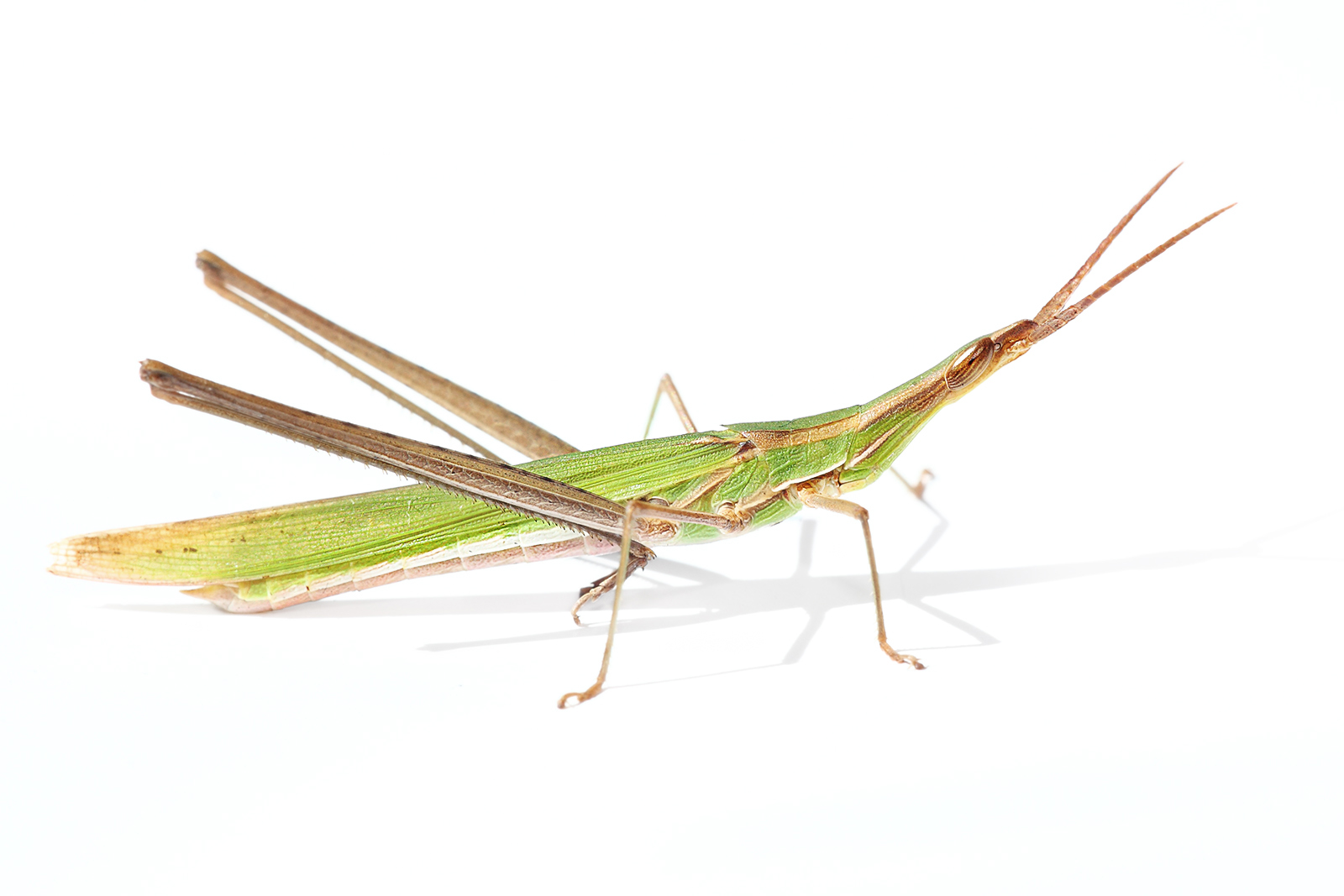
- Acrida conica

Scientific classification
- Kingdom: Animalia
- Phylum: Arthropoda
- Clade: Pancrustacea
- Class: Insecta
- Order: Orthoptera
- Suborder: Caelifera
- Family: Acrididae
- Subfamily: Acridinae
- Tribe: Acridini; MacLeay, 1821

Genera
- See text

Synonyms
- Acridia MacLeay, 1821

= Acridini =

Tribe of grasshoppers

Acridini is a tribe of insects in the subfamily Acridinae, of the insect family Acrididae and are sometimes called "silent slant-faced grasshoppers". It was firstly described as Truxalis Conicus in 1781.

== Description ==
Insects of this tribe are usually slender and like other members of the subfamily Acridinae lack stridulatory pegs and are silent.

== Genera ==
This tribe includes several monotypic Australian genera; the Orthoptera Species File lists:.

- Acrida Linnaeus, 1758 (widespread in Old World & Australasia)
- Acridarachnea Bolívar, 1908 (Africa) monotypic:
  - Acridarachnea ophthalmica Bolívar, 1908
- Caledia Bolívar, 1914 (Australia) monotypic:
  - Caledia captiva (Fabricius, 1775)
- Calephorops Sjöstedt, 1920 (Australia) monotypic:
  - Calephorops viridis Sjöstedt, 1920
- Cryptobothrus Rehn, 1907 (Australia, synonyms Austrobothrus Sjöstedt, 1921, Exobothrus Sjöstedt, 1936) monotypic:
  - Cryptobothrus chrysophorus Rehn, 1907

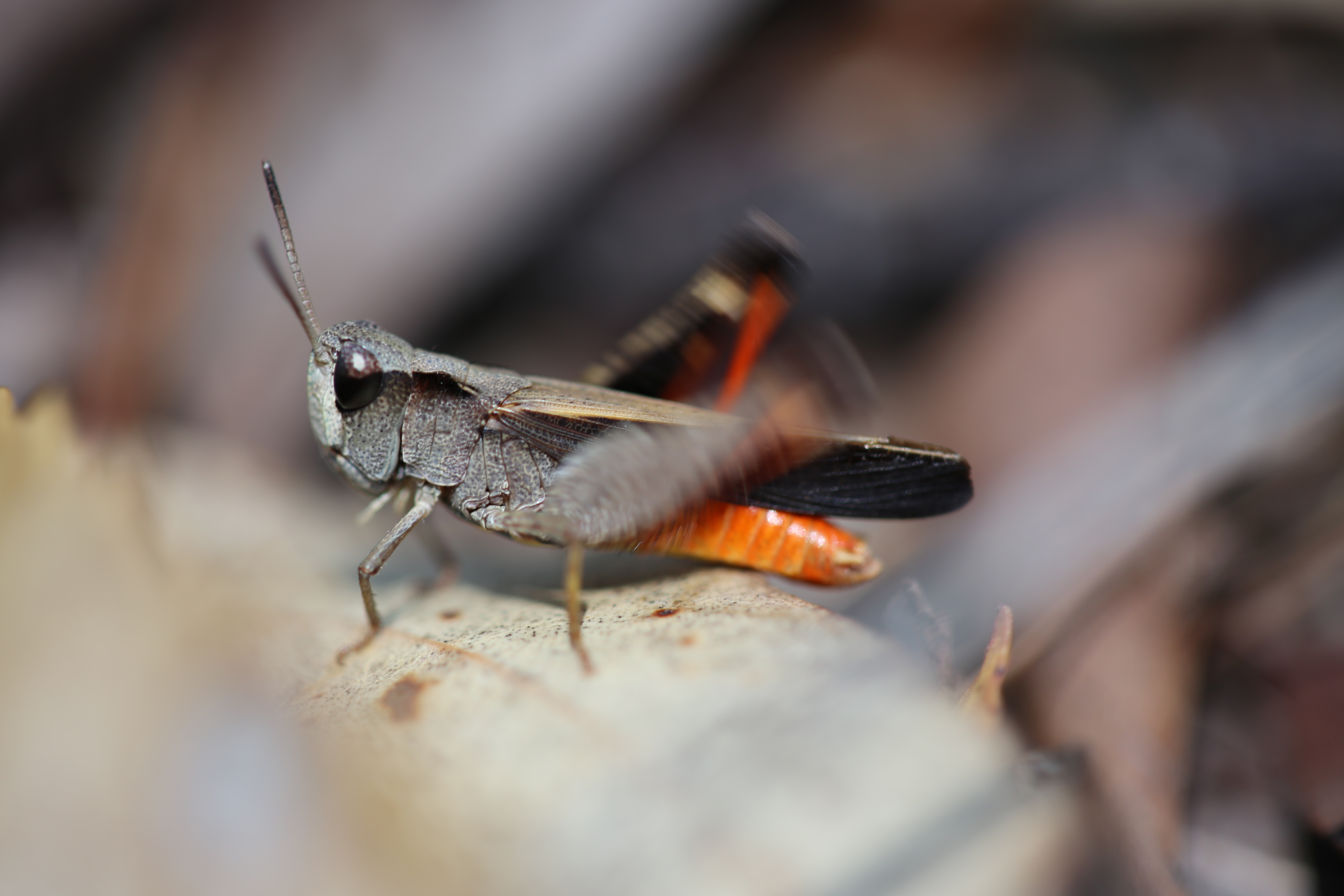
Cryptobothrus chrysophorus

- Froggattina Tillyard, 1926 (Australia) monotypic:
  - Froggattina australis (Walker, 1870)
- Keshava (insect) Gupta & Chandra, 2017 (India)
  - Keshava barnawaparensis Gupta & Chandra, 2017
  - Keshava jugadensis Gupta & Chandra, 2017
  - Keshava shishodensis Gupta & Chandra, 2017
- Perala Sjöstedt, 1921 (Australia) monotypic:
  - Perala viridis Sjöstedt, 1921
- Rapsilla Sjöstedt, 1921 (Australia) monotypic:
  - Rapsilla fusca Sjöstedt, 1921
- Schizobothrus Sjöstedt, 1921 (Australia) monotypic:
  - Schizobothrus flavovittatus Sjöstedt, 1921
