= List of locust species =

This is a list (alphabetized by binomial species name) of locust species of the taxonomic family Acrididae capable of density-dependent phase polyphenism and swarming behaviour, potentially inflicting massive damage to crops.

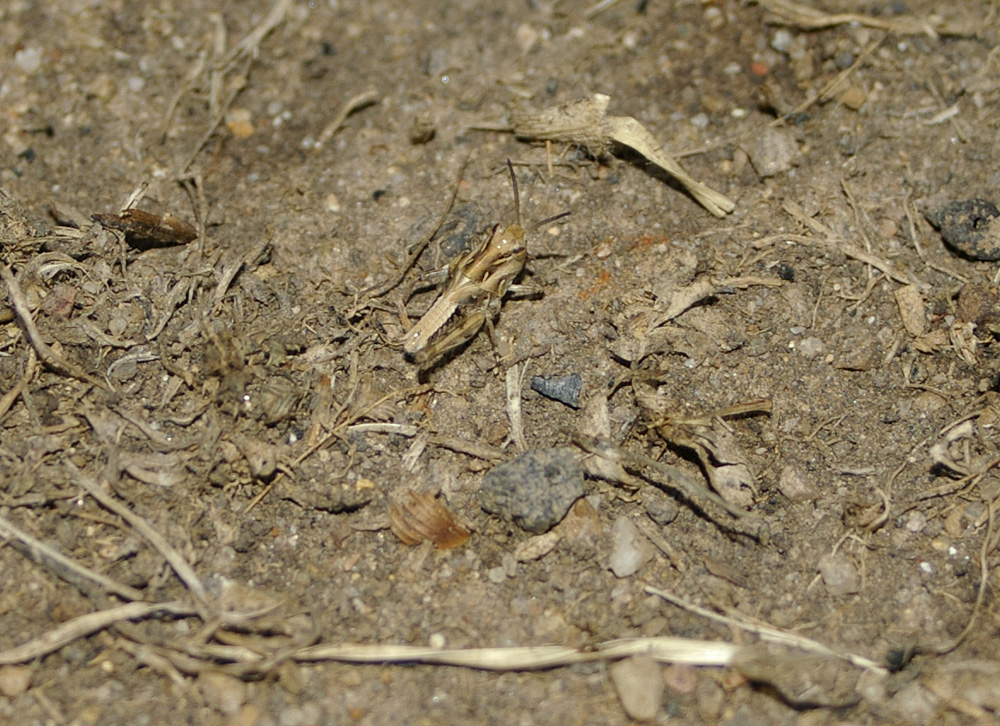
Australian plague locust nymph (fourth instar)

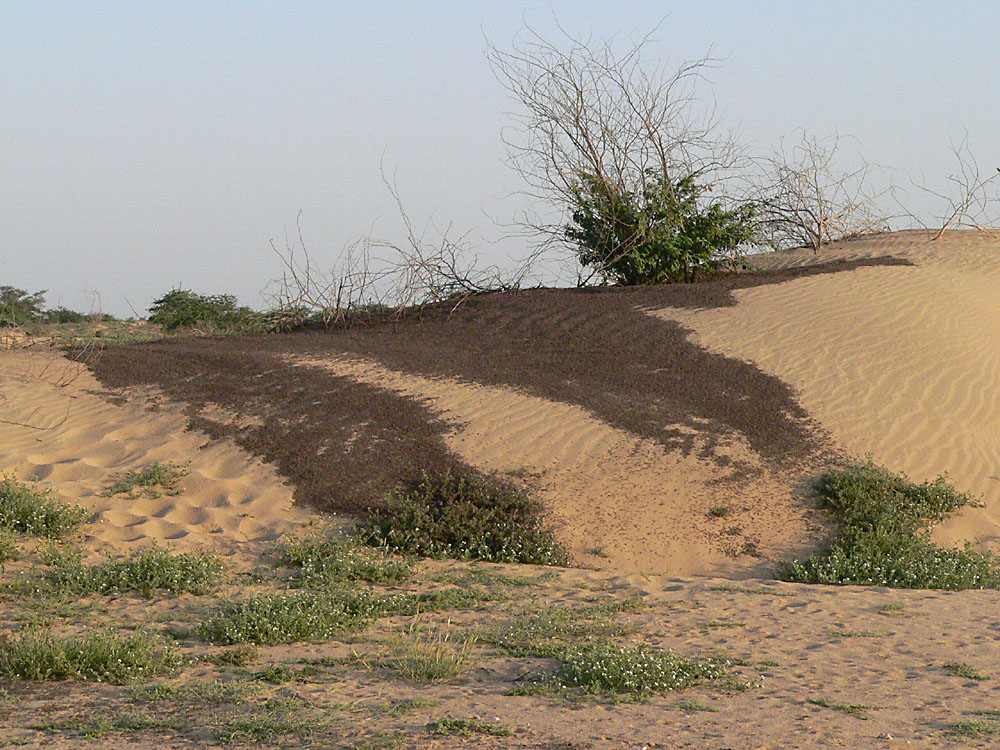
Dense hopper band of desert locusts

- Aiolopus simulatrix – Sudan plague locust of eastern Sudan
- Anacridium aegyptium – Egyptian locust of Europe, northern Africa and Central Asia
- Anacridium melanorhodon – Sahelian tree locust of Sahel region of Africa
- Anacridium wernerellum – Sudan tree locust of Sudanese vegetation zone
- Austracris guttulosa – Spur-throated locust of Australia
- Austroicetes cruciata – Small plague grasshopper of Australia
- Calliptamus italicus – Italian locust of semi-deserts and steppes of Morocco, central Europe and Central Asia
- Ceracris kiangsu – Yellow-spined bamboo locust of Indo-China and southern China
- Chortoicetes terminifera – Australian plague locust of Australia
- Dericorys: two species are called "saxaul locusts" in Central Asia
- Dissosteira longipennis – High plains locust of North America (formed large swarms as recently as the 1930s but never since)
- Dociostaurus maroccanus – Moroccan locust of semi-deserts and steppes of Morocco, North Africa, southern and eastern Europe, Middle East and western Asia
- Gastrimargus musicus – Yellow-winged locust of Australia
- Gomphocerus sibiricus – Siberian locust of Siberia and high mountains of Europe
- Locusta migratoria – Migratory locust of Asia, Africa and eastern Europe
- Locustana pardalina – Brown locust of Southern Africa
- Melanoplus differentialis – Differential grasshopper of Northern Mexico, central USA and southern Ontario, Canada
- Melanoplus sanguinipes – Migratory grasshopper of Caribbean and North America
- Melanoplus spretus – Rocky Mountain locust of North America (now extinct)
- Nomadacris septemfasciata – Red locust of southern and south central Africa
- Nomadacris succincta – Bombay locust of India and Southeast Asia
- Oedaleus senegalensis – Senegalese grasshopper of Sahel region of Africa, the Canary Islands, Cape Verde Islands and West Asia
- Rhammatocerus schistocercoides – Mato Grosso locust of Brazil
- Schistocerca cancellata – South American locust of South America
- Schistocerca gregaria – Desert locust of deserts of western Africa, northern Africa and western India
- Schistocerca piceifrons – Central American locust of Central America
- Schistocerca interrita – Peru locust of western South America
