= Sedge (disambiguation) =

Sedges, Cyperaceae, are a family of graminoid (grass-like) flowering plants named for the saw-like edges of their leaves.

Sedge may also refer to:

== Plants ==
- Acorus calamus, sweet flag, a plant in the family Acoraceae
- Carex, the true sedge genus

== Other uses ==
- USCGC Sedge (WLB 402), a United States coastguard
- Nickname of Liversedge F.C., a football (soccer) club in West Yorkshire, England
- A term of venery or collective noun for several species of birds, including bitterns, cranes and herons
- An alternative name for caddisflies
