= Juvenile (organism) =

Individual organism that has not yet reached its adult form

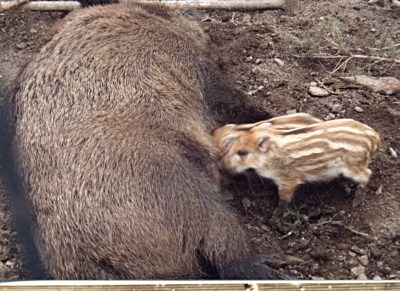
Young wild boar suckling from an adult female; here, juvenile colouring acts as a form of camouflage.

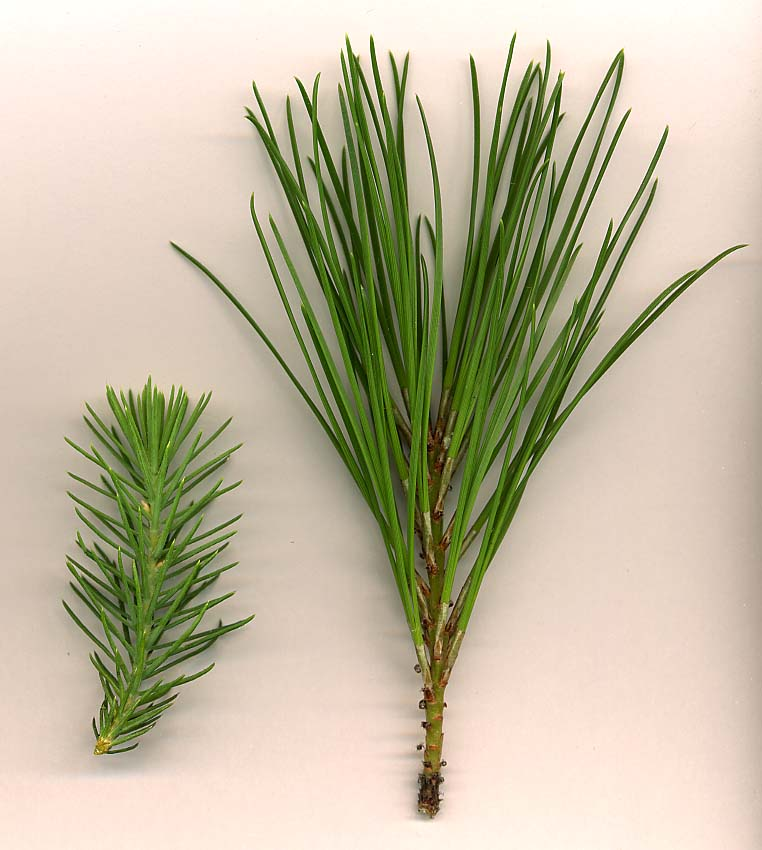
Juvenile (left) and adult (right) leaves of stone pine

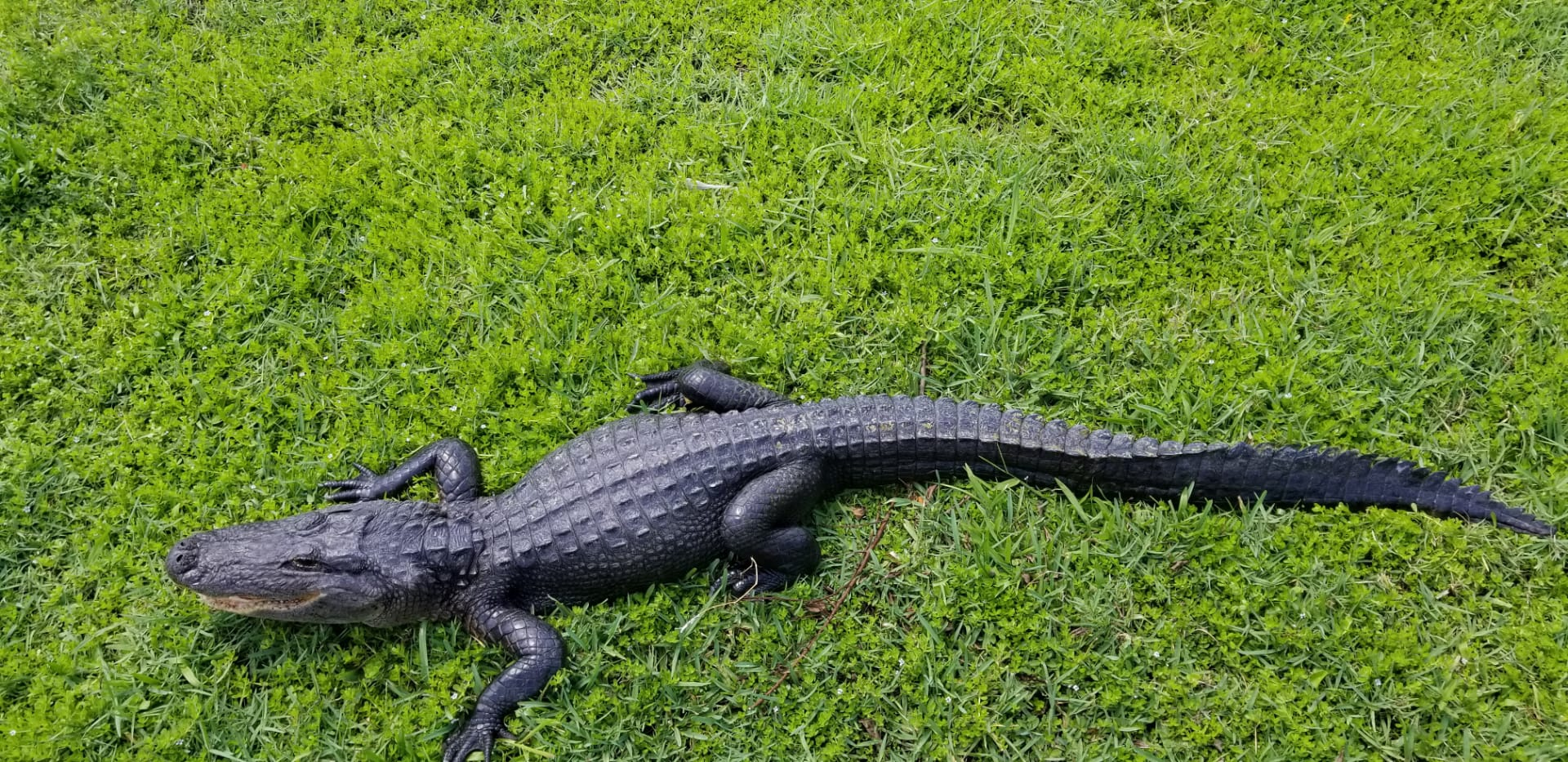
Juvenile alligator in the Everglades

A juvenile is an individual organism (especially an animal) that has not yet reached its adult form, sexual maturity or size. Juveniles can look very different from the adult form, particularly in colour, and may not fill the same niche as the adult form. In many organisms the juvenile has a different name from the adult (see List of animal names).

Some organisms reach sexual maturity in a short metamorphosis, such as ecdysis in many insects and some other arthropods. For others, the transition from juvenile to fully mature is a more prolonged process—puberty in humans and other species (like higher primates and whales), for example. In such cases, juveniles during this transformation are sometimes called subadults.

Many invertebrates cease development upon reaching adulthood. The stages of such invertebrates are larvae or nymphs.

In vertebrates and some invertebrates (e.g. spiders), larval forms (e.g. tadpoles) are usually considered a development stage of their own, and "juvenile" refers to a post-larval stage that is not fully grown or sexually mature. In amniotes, the embryo represents the larval stage. Here, a "juvenile" is an individual in the time between hatching/birth/germination and reaching maturity.

== Examples ==
- For animal larval juveniles, see larva.
- Juvenile birds or bats can be known as fledglings.
- For cat juveniles, see kitten.
- For dog juveniles, see puppy.
- For human juvenile life stages, see youth, infant, toddler, child, adolescence.
- For trees see sapling
