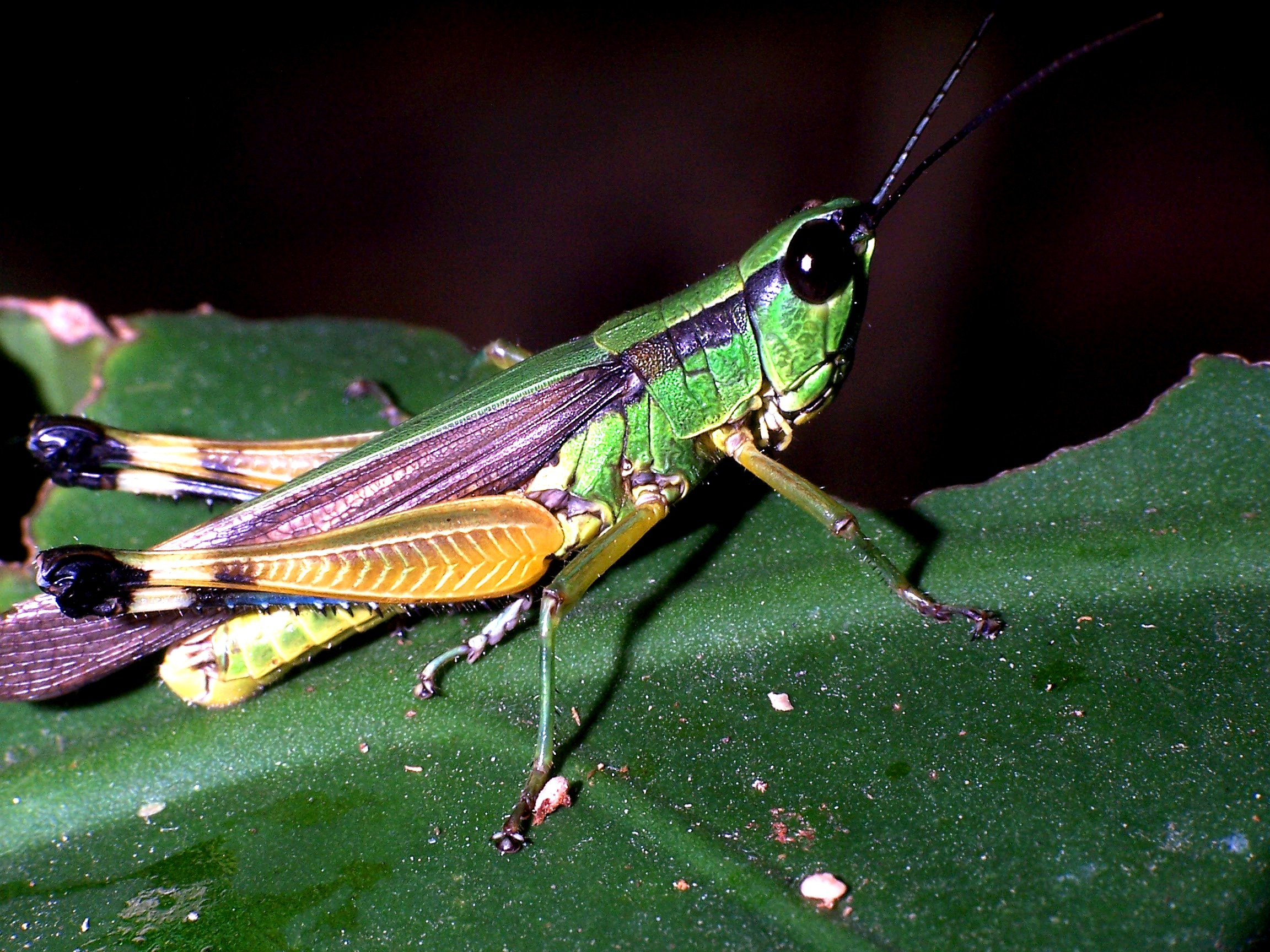
- Ceracris cf. fasciata

Scientific classification
- Kingdom: Animalia
- Phylum: Arthropoda
- Class: Insecta
- Order: Orthoptera
- Suborder: Caelifera
- Family: Acrididae
- Subfamily: Oedipodinae
- Tribe: Parapleurini
- Genus: Ceracris; Walker, 1870

Synonyms
- Geea Caudell, 1921; Kuthya Bolívar, 1909; Rammeacris Willemse, 1951

= Ceracris =

Genus of grasshoppers

Ceracris is a genus of grasshoppers in the family Acrididae, subfamily Oedipodinae, found in tropical Asia. C. kiangsu is the yellow-spined bamboo locust which infests Indo-China and southern China.

== Species ==
The Orthoptera Species File and Catalogue of Life list:

- Ceracris amplicornis Cao, Dang & Yin, 2019
- Ceracris chuannanensis Ou, Zheng & Chen, 1995
- Ceracris deflorata Brunner von Wattenwyl, 1893
- Ceracris fasciata Brunner von Wattenwyl, 1893
- Ceracris hainanensis Liu & Li, 1995
- Ceracris hoffmanni Uvarov, 1931
- Ceracris jianfenglingensis Feng, Qiao & Yin, 2018
- Ceracris jiangxiensis Wang, 1992
- Ceracris kiangsu Tsai, 1929
- Ceracris nigricornis Walker, 1870
  - type species (subspecies nigricornis, locality Darjeeling)
- Ceracris striata Uvarov, 1925
- Ceracris szemaoensis Zheng, 1977
- Ceracris versicolor Brunner von Wattenwyl, 1893
- Ceracris xizangensis Liu, 1981
