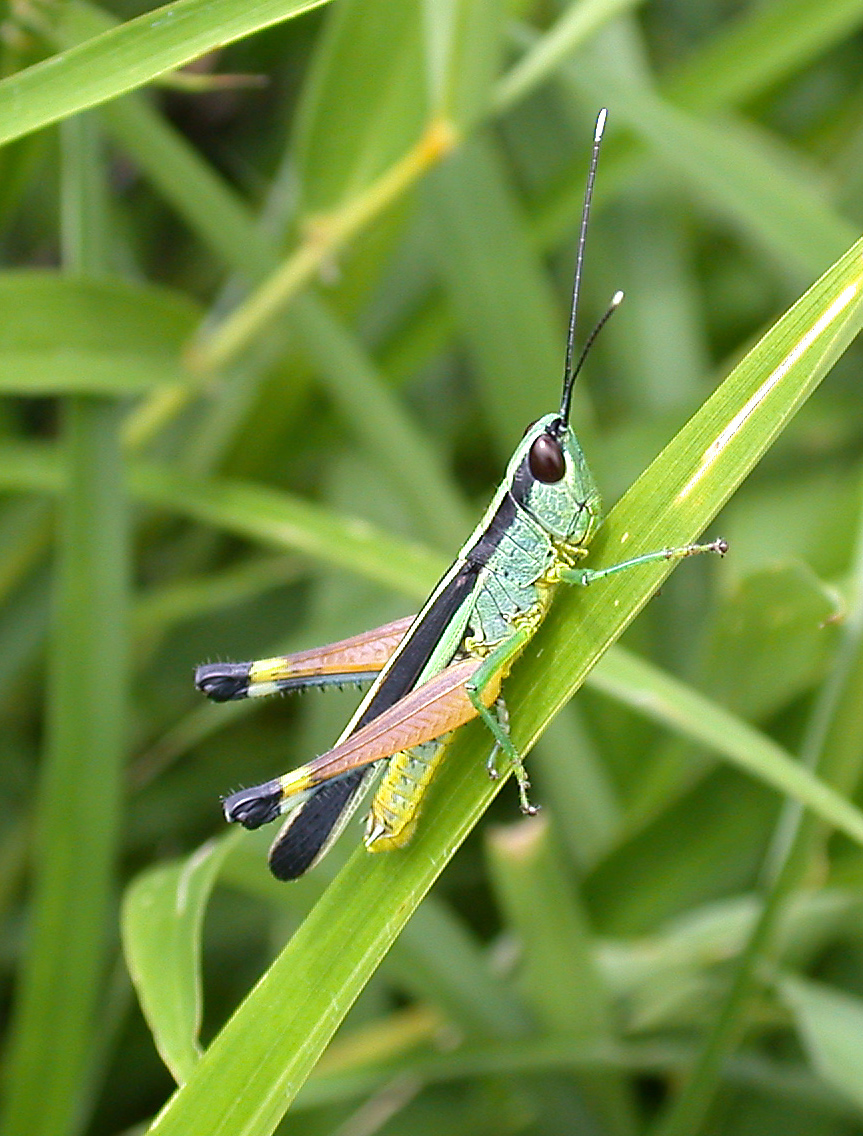
- Ceracris fasciata, Thailand

Scientific classification
- Domain: Eukaryota
- Kingdom: Animalia
- Phylum: Arthropoda
- Class: Insecta
- Order: Orthoptera
- Suborder: Caelifera
- Family: Acrididae
- Subfamily: Oedipodinae
- Tribe: Parapleurini
- Genus: Ceracris
- Species: C. fasciata

Binomial name
- Ceracris fasciata (Brunner von Wattenwyl, 1893)

= Ceracris fasciata =

Species of grasshopper

Ceracris fasciata is a species of band-winged grasshopper in the family Acrididae. It is found in Indomalaya.

== Subspecies ==
These subspecies belong to the species Ceracris fasciata:

- Ceracris fasciata fasciata (Brunner von Wattenwyl, 1893)
- Ceracris fasciata szemaoensis Zheng, 1977
