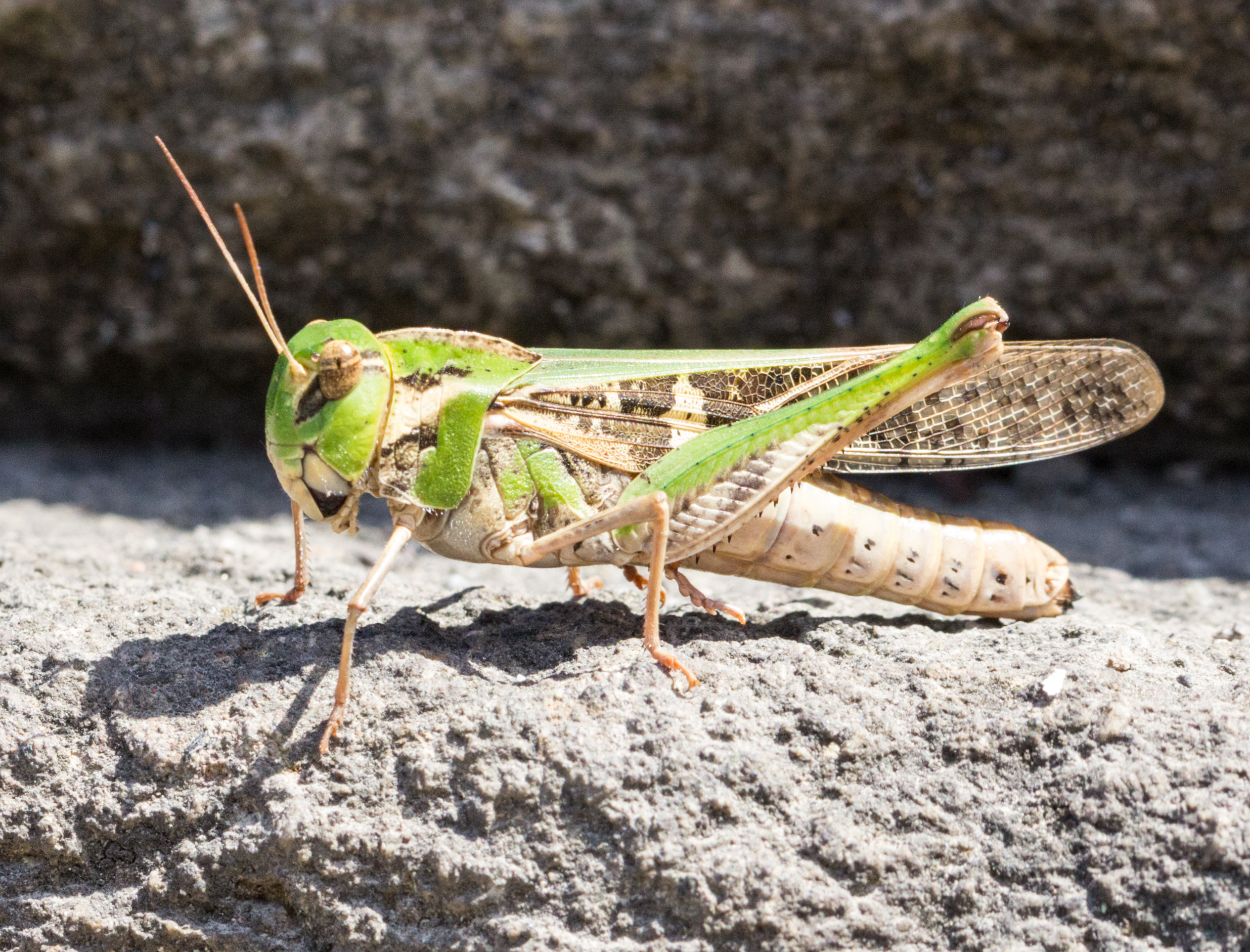
- Gastrimargus marmoratus

Scientific classification
- Kingdom: Animalia
- Phylum: Arthropoda
- Clade: Pancrustacea
- Class: Insecta
- Order: Orthoptera
- Suborder: Caelifera
- Family: Acrididae
- Subfamily: Oedipodinae
- Tribe: Locustini
- Genus: Gastrimargus
- Species: G. marmoratus

Binomial name
- Gastrimargus marmoratus (Thunberg, 1815)

Synonyms
- Gastrimargus marmoratus sundaicus Saussure, 1884; Oedaleus marmoratus sundaicus (Saussure, 1884); Gastrimargus sundaicus Saussure, 1884; Oedipoda citrina Burmeister, 1838; Gryllus assimilis Thunberg, 1815; Gryllus virescens Thunberg, 1815; Gryllus transversus Thunberg, 1815; Oedaleus marmoratus (Thunberg, 1815); Gastrimargus marmoratus transversus (Thunberg, 1815); Gastrimargus assimilis (Thunberg, 1815); Gryllus marmoratus Thunberg, 1815; Gryllus flavus Stoll, C., 1813

= Gastrimargus marmoratus =

Species of grasshopper

Gastrimargus marmoratus is a species of band-winged grasshopper in the family Acrididae. It is found in southern Africa, Indomalaya, and eastern Asia.
