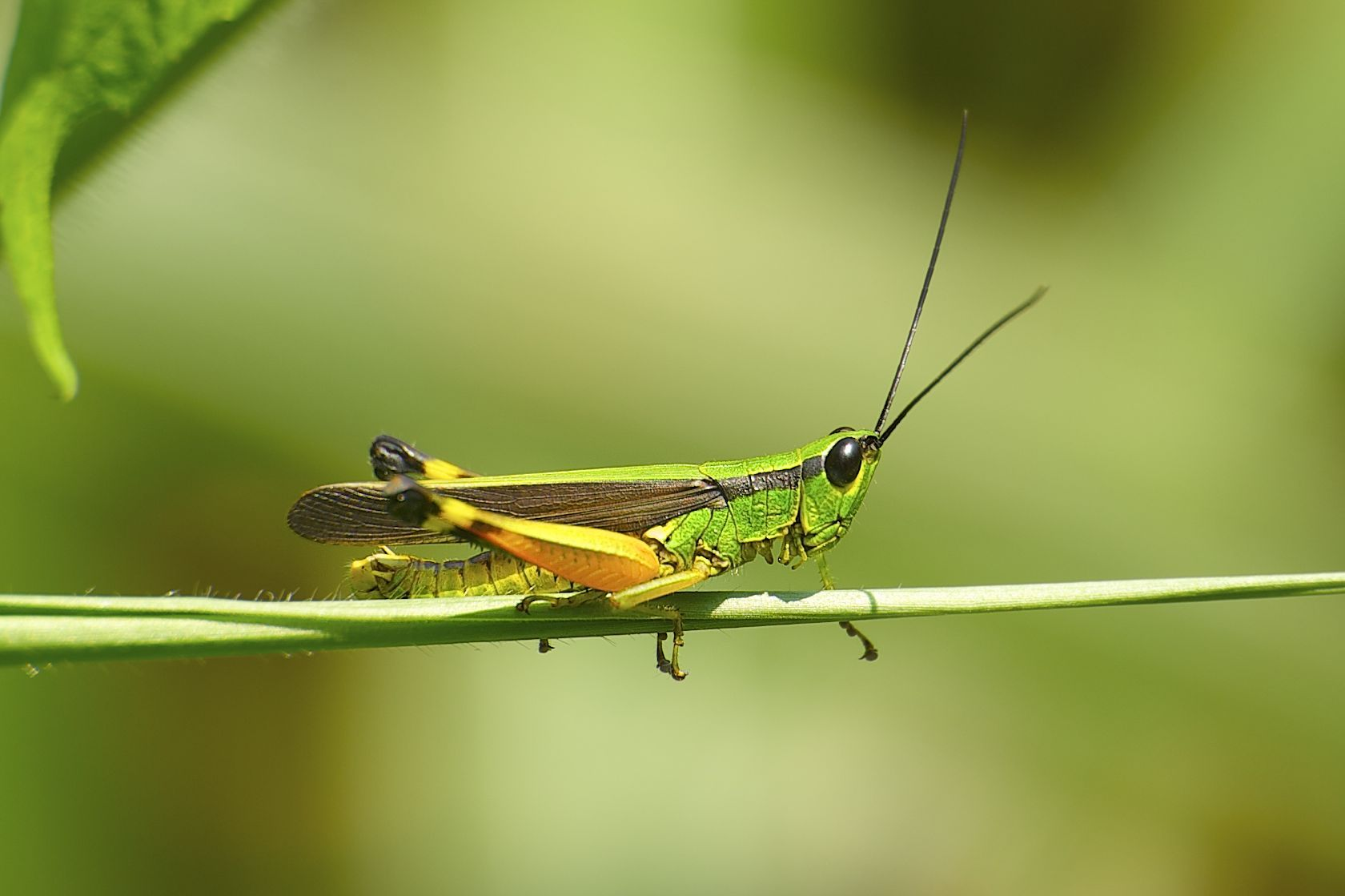
- Ceracris nigricornis, Hong Kong

Scientific classification
- Kingdom: Animalia
- Phylum: Arthropoda
- Class: Insecta
- Order: Orthoptera
- Suborder: Caelifera
- Family: Acrididae
- Subfamily: Oedipodinae
- Tribe: Parapleurini
- Genus: Ceracris
- Species: C. nigricornis

Binomial name
- Ceracris nigricornis Walker, 1870

= Ceracris nigricornis =

Species of grasshopper

Ceracris nigricornis is a species of band-winged grasshopper in the family Acrididae, found in Asia.

== Subspecies ==
These subspecies belong to the species Ceracris nigricornis:

- Ceracris nigricornis laeta (Bolívar, 1914)
- Ceracris nigricornis nigricornis Walker, 1870
