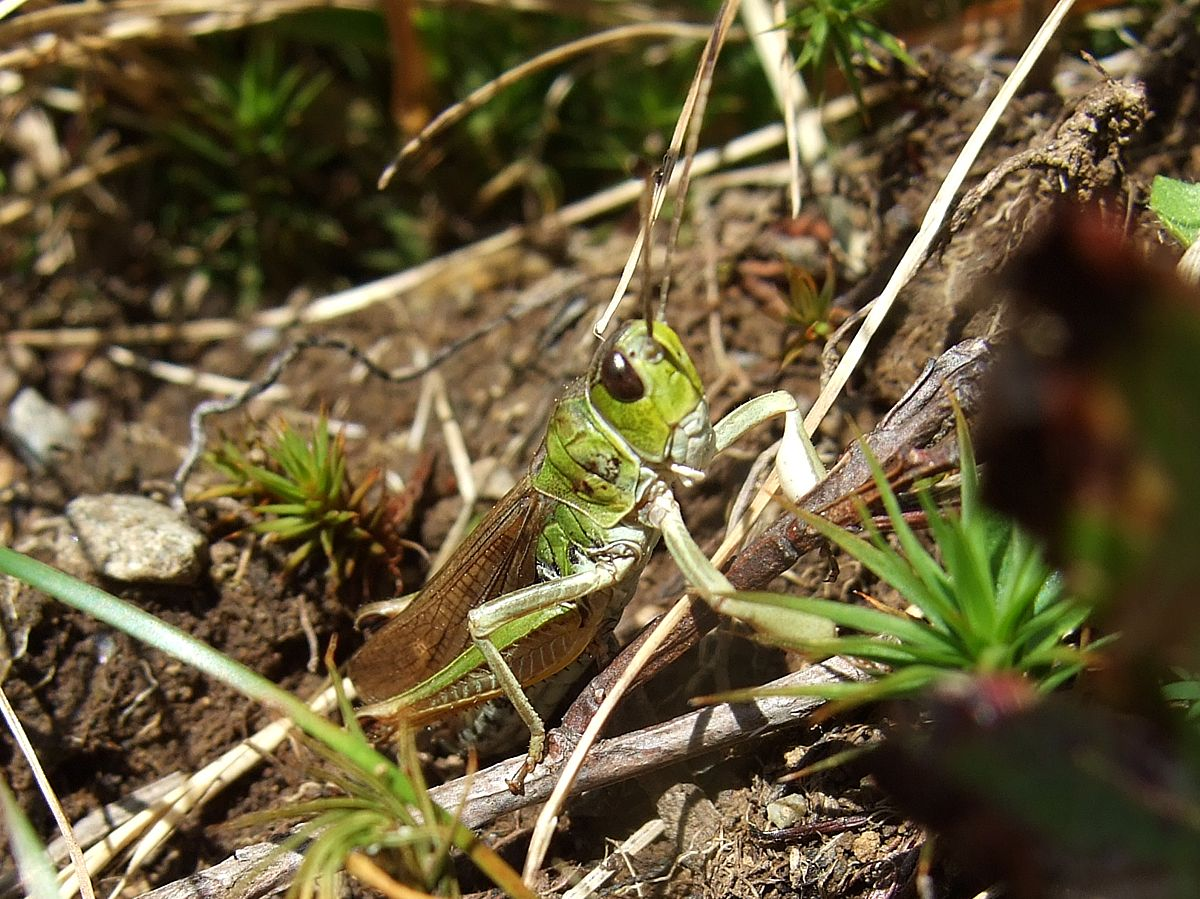
- Gomphocerus sibiricus

Scientific classification
- Domain: Eukaryota
- Kingdom: Animalia
- Phylum: Arthropoda
- Class: Insecta
- Order: Orthoptera
- Suborder: Caelifera
- Family: Acrididae
- Subfamily: Gomphocerinae
- Tribe: Gomphocerini
- Genus: Gomphocerus; Thunberg, 1815

= Gomphocerus =

Genus of grasshoppers

Gomphocerus is a genus of grasshoppers (Caelifera: Acrididae) in the tribe Gomphocerini. Species can be found in Europe and Asia, with one species in South America (Gomphocerus semicolor).

== Species ==
Gomphocerus includes the following species:

- Gomphocerus armeniacus Uvarov, 1931
- Gomphocerus dispar Fischer von Waldheim, 1846
- Gomphocerus evanescens Stål, 1861
- Gomphocerus kudia Caudell, 1928
- Gomphocerus licenti Chang, 1939
- Gomphocerus plebejus Stål, 1861
- Gomphocerus semicolor Burmeister, 1838
- Gomphocerus sibiricus Linnaeus, 1767 - type species (as Gryllus sibiricus L. = Gomphocerus sibiricus sibiricus)
- Gomphocerus transcaucasicus Mistshenko, 1951
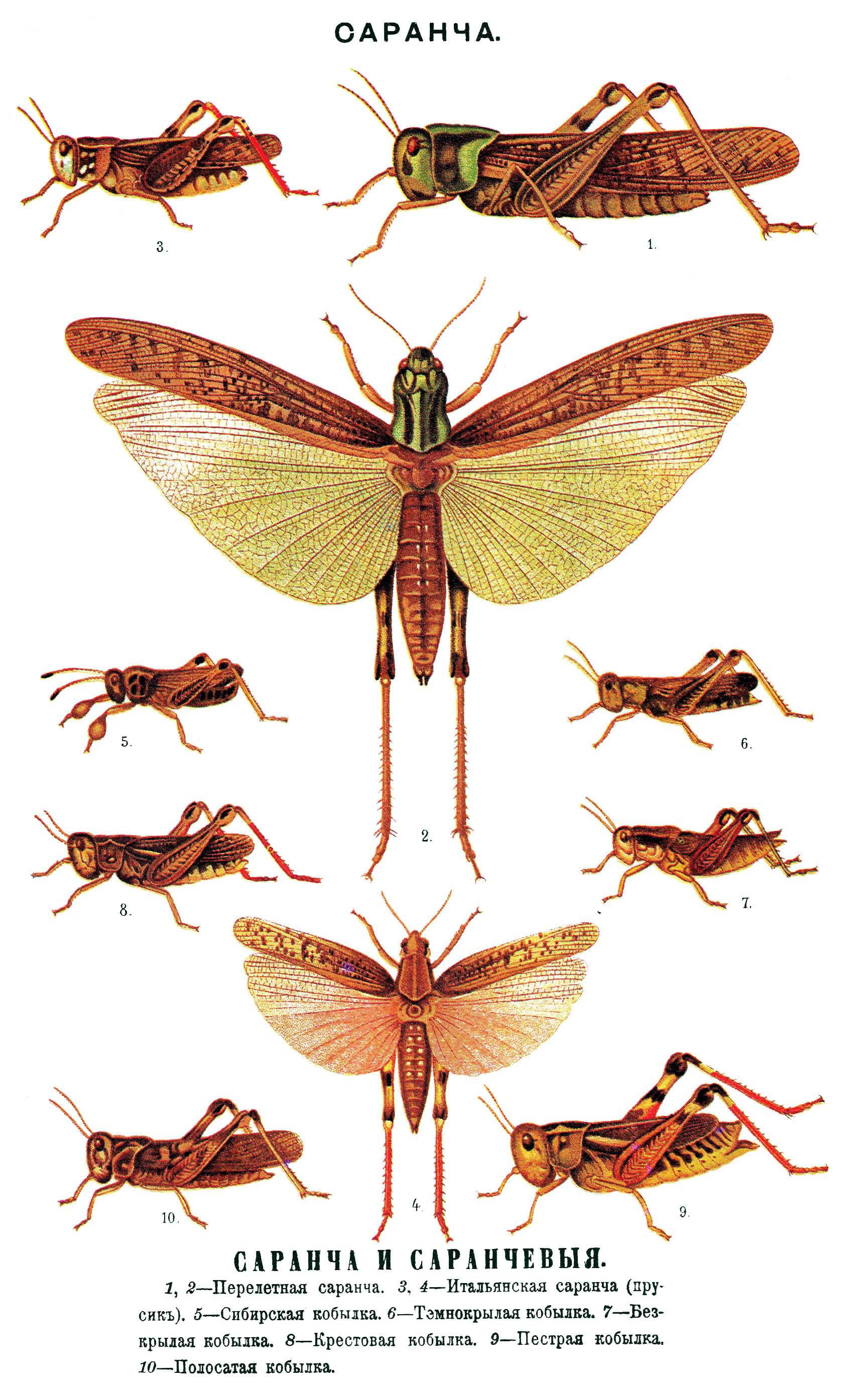
Illustrations from Brockhaus and Efron Encyclopedic Dictionary

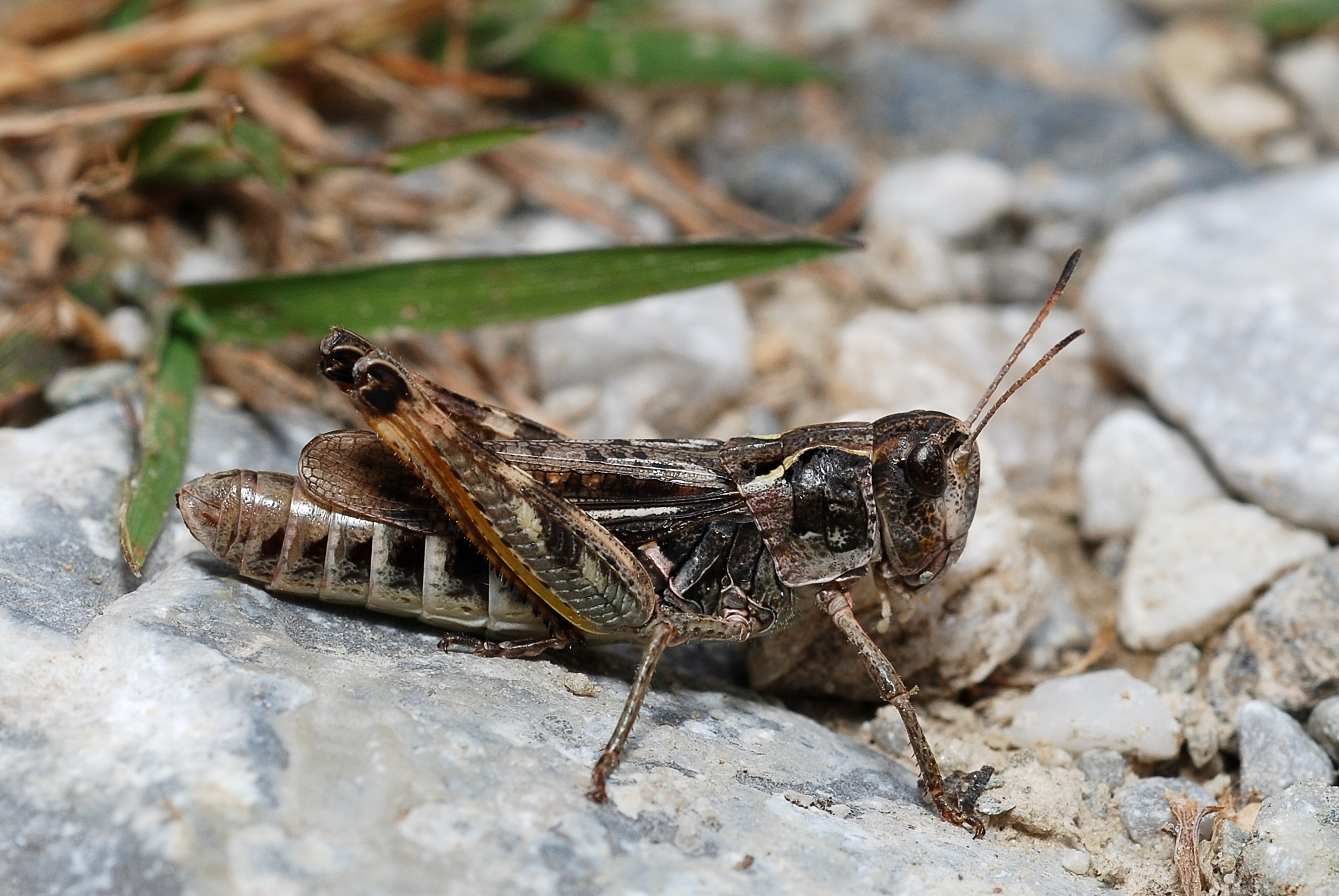
Gomphocerus sibiricus female

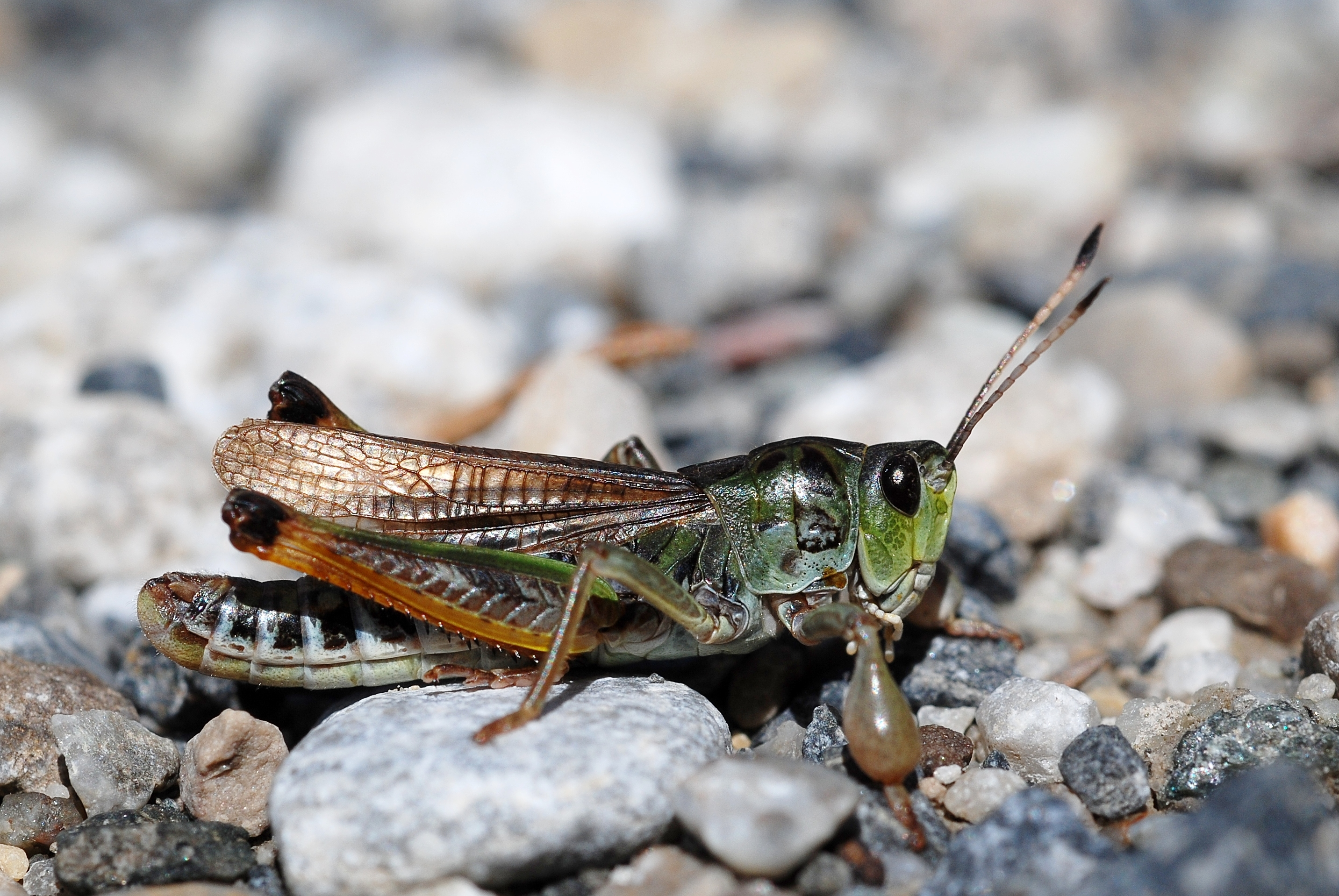
Gomphocerus sibiricus male
