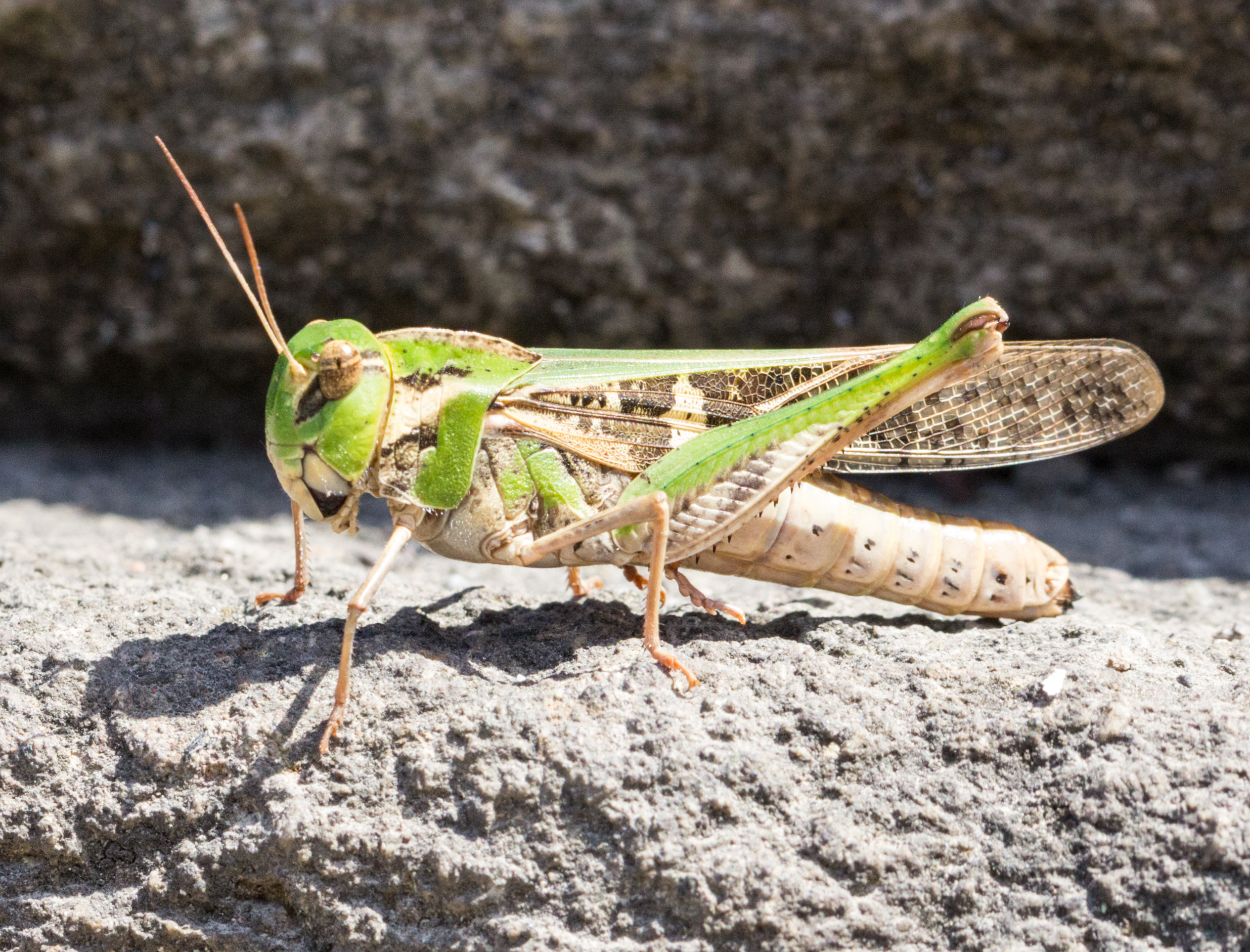
- Gastrimargus marmoratus

Scientific classification
- Domain: Eukaryota
- Kingdom: Animalia
- Phylum: Arthropoda
- Class: Insecta
- Order: Orthoptera
- Suborder: Caelifera
- Family: Acrididae
- Subfamily: Oedipodinae
- Tribe: Locustini
- Genus: Gastrimargus; Saussure, 1884

Synonyms
- Gastrimargulus Benediktov, 2009

= Gastrimargus =

Genus of grasshoppers

Gastrimargus is a genus of grasshoppers in the subfamily Oedipodinae (tribe Locustini). The recorded distribution of species in this genus includes Africa, Asia, and Oceania.

== Species ==
Species include:

- Gastrimargus acutangulus (Stål, 1873)
- Gastrimargus africanus (Saussure, 1888)
- Gastrimargus angolensis Sjöstedt, 1928
- Gastrimargus crassicollis (Saussure, 1888)
- Gastrimargus determinatus (Walker, 1871)
- Gastrimargus drakensbergensis Ritchie, 1982
- Gastrimargus hyla Sjöstedt, 1928
- Gastrimargus immaculatus (Chopard, 1957)
- Gastrimargus insolens Ritchie, 1982
- Gastrimargus lombokensis Sjöstedt, 1928
- Gastrimargus marmoratus (Thunberg, 1815) - type species (as "Gryllus virescens" Thunberg)
- Gastrimargus miombo Ritchie, 1982
- Gastrimargus mirabilis Uvarov, 1923
- Gastrimargus musicus (Fabricius, 1775)
- Gastrimargus nubilus Uvarov, 1925
- Gastrimargus obscurus Ritchie, 1982
- Gastrimargus ochraceus Sjöstedt, 1928
- Gastrimargus ommatidius Huang, 1981
- Gastrimargus rothschildi Bolívar, 1922
- Gastrimargus subfasciatus (Haan, 1842)
- Gastrimargus verticalis (Saussure, 1884)
- Gastrimargus wahlbergii (Stål, 1873)
- Gastrimargus willemsei Ritchie, 1982
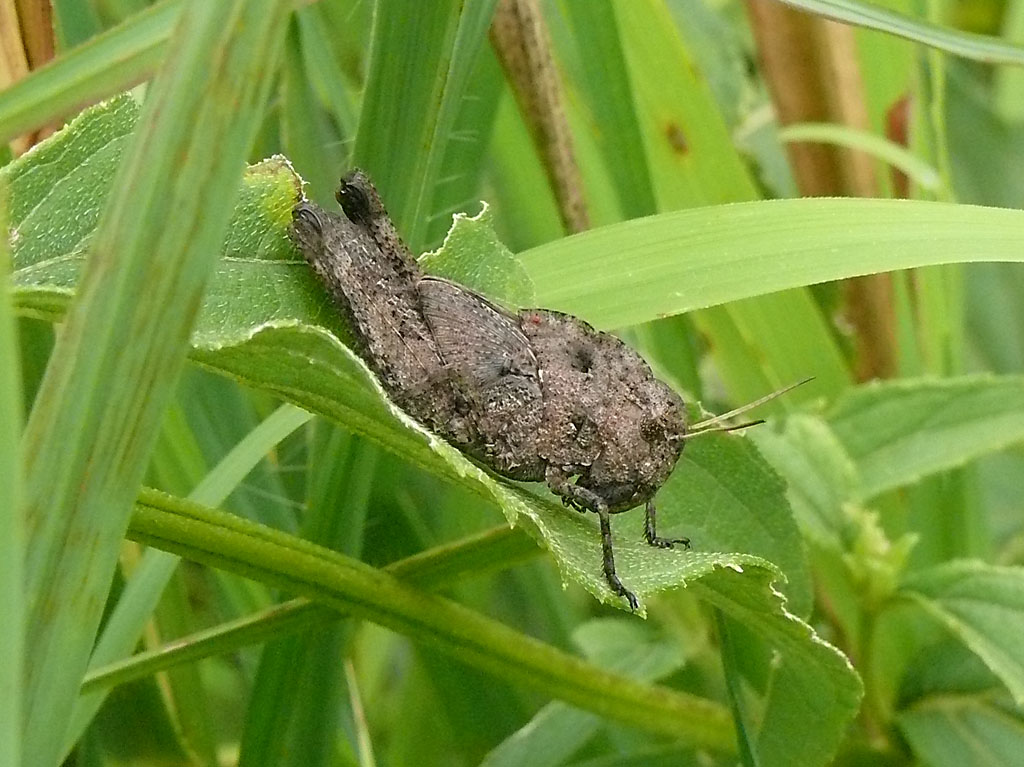
Gastrimargus africanus africanus 5th instar

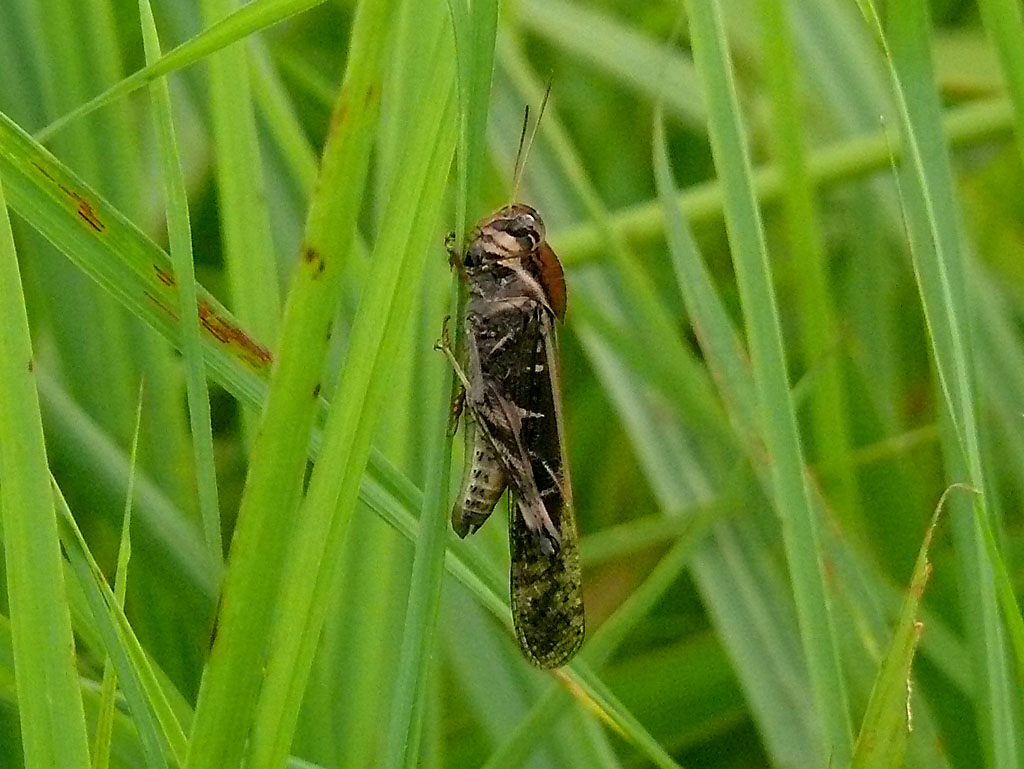
Gastrimargus africanus africanus male

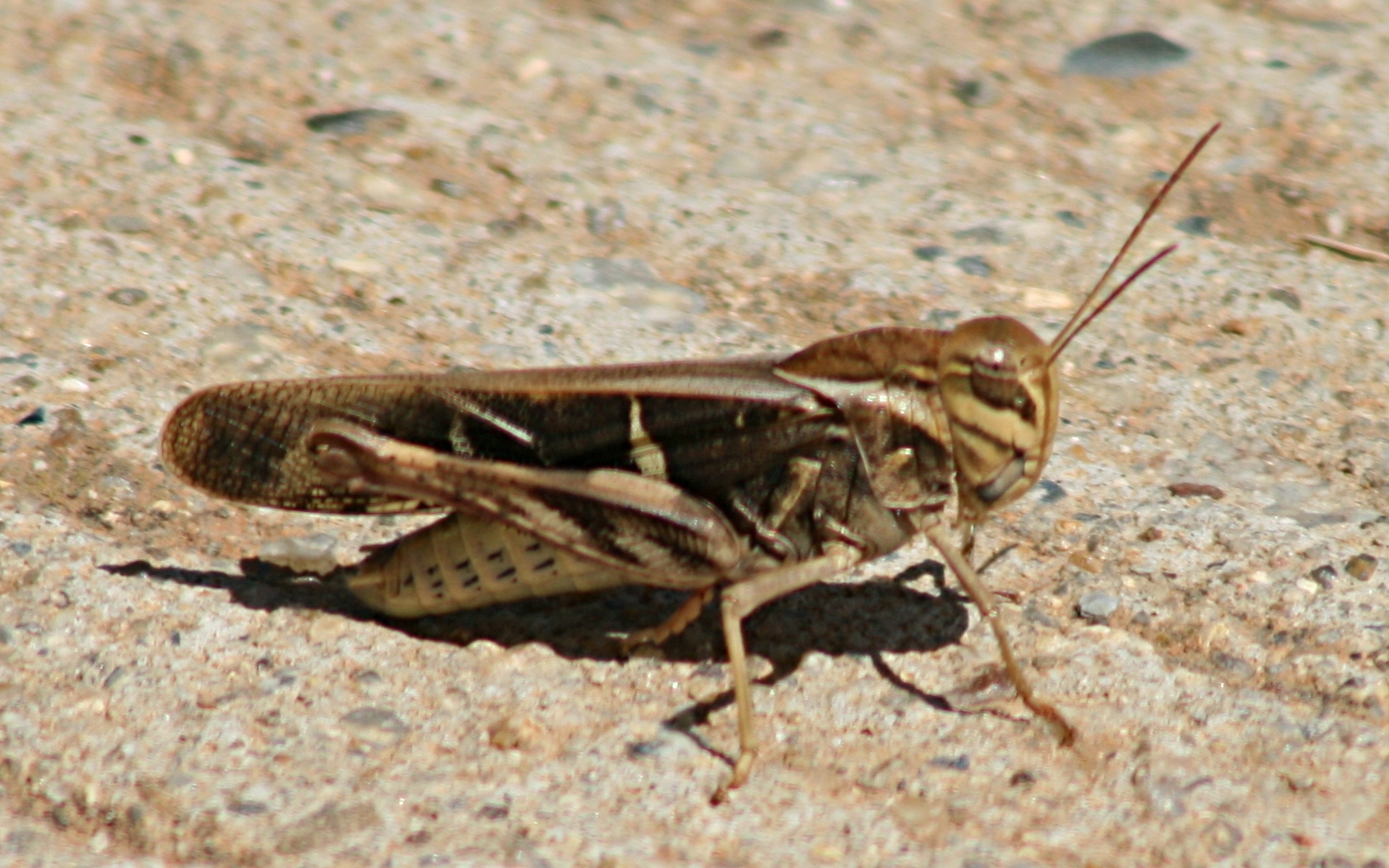
Gastrimargus musicus

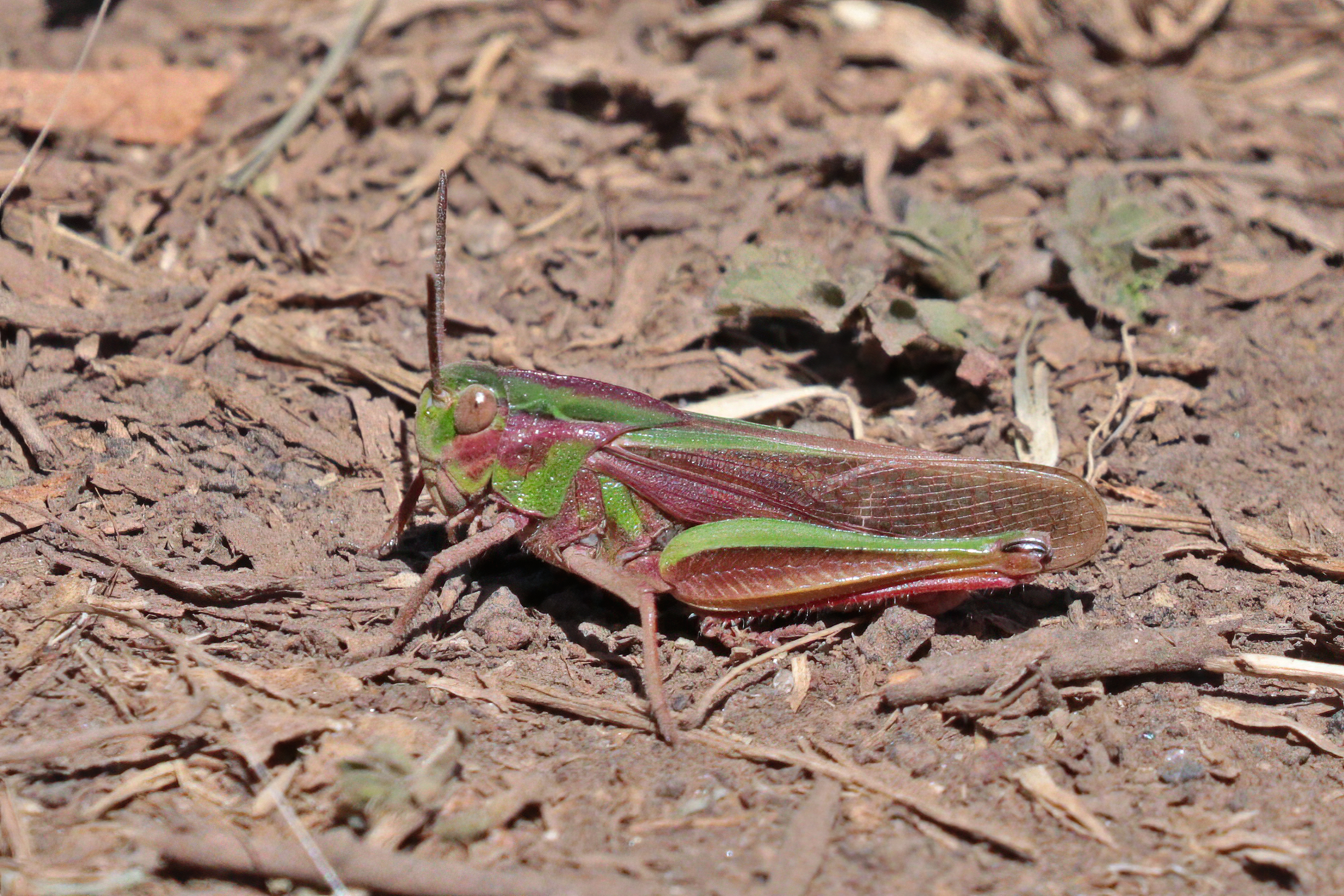
Gastrimargus cf verticalis, Ethiopia
