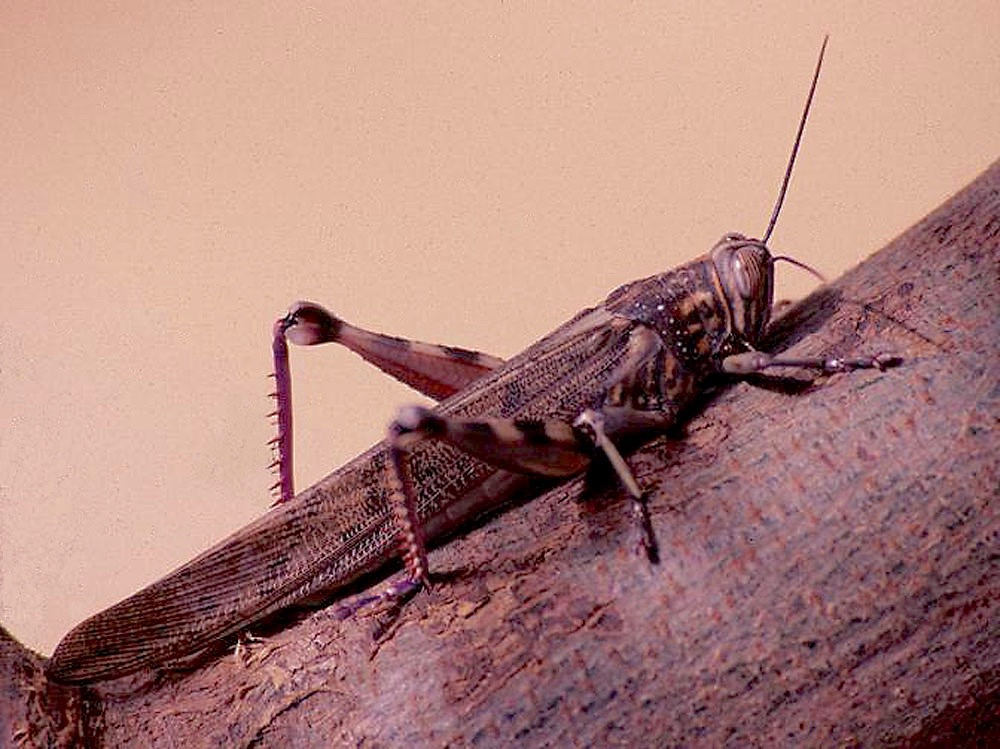

Scientific classification
- Kingdom: Animalia
- Phylum: Arthropoda
- Class: Insecta
- Order: Orthoptera
- Suborder: Caelifera
- Family: Acrididae
- Genus: Anacridium
- Species: A. melanorhodon

Binomial name
- Anacridium melanorhodon (Walker, F., 1870)

Synonyms
- All for A. melanorhodon melanorhodon: Acridium aethiopicum Finot, 1907; Schistocerca exsul Scudder, 1893; Locusta (Orthacanthacris) wernerella variety sphalera Karny, 1907

= Anacridium melanorhodon =

Species of grasshopper

Anacridium melanorhodon, known as the Sahelian tree locust, is a species of grasshoppers in the subfamily Cyrtacanthacridinae.

== Subspecies ==
The Orthoptera Species File lists:

- A. melanorhodon arabafrum Dirsh, 1953
- A. melanorhodon melanorhodon (Walker, 1870) (as Acridium melanorhodon Walker) - is the Sahelian tree locust

== Gallery ==
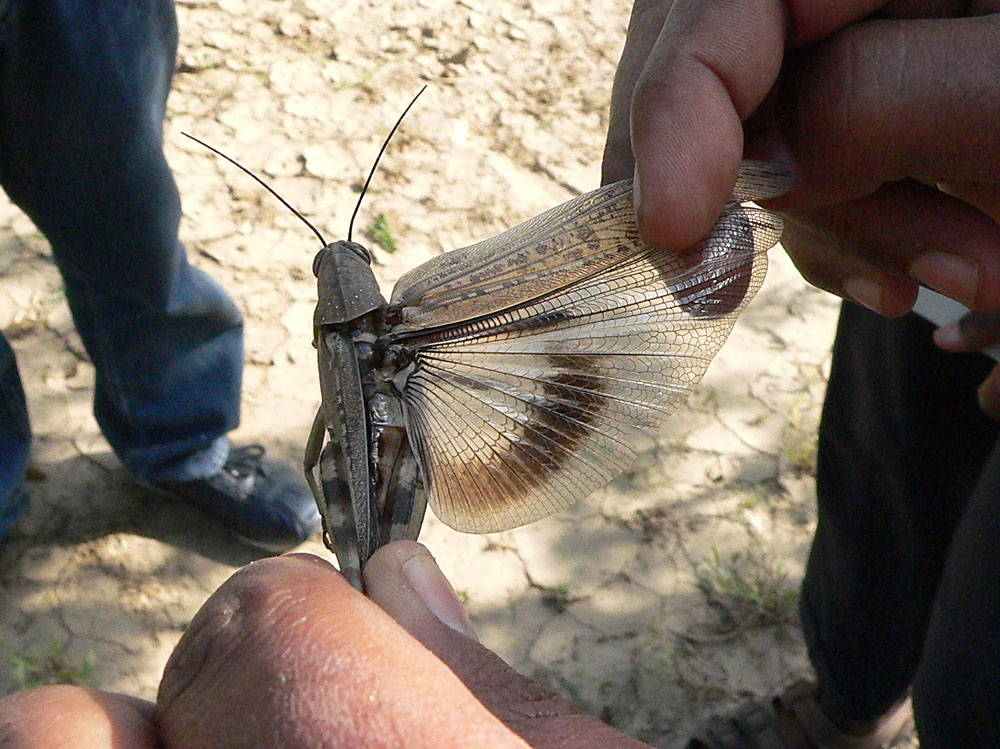
Wing of Anacridium melanorhodon arabafrum, Aguetai, Red Sea coast, Sudan.

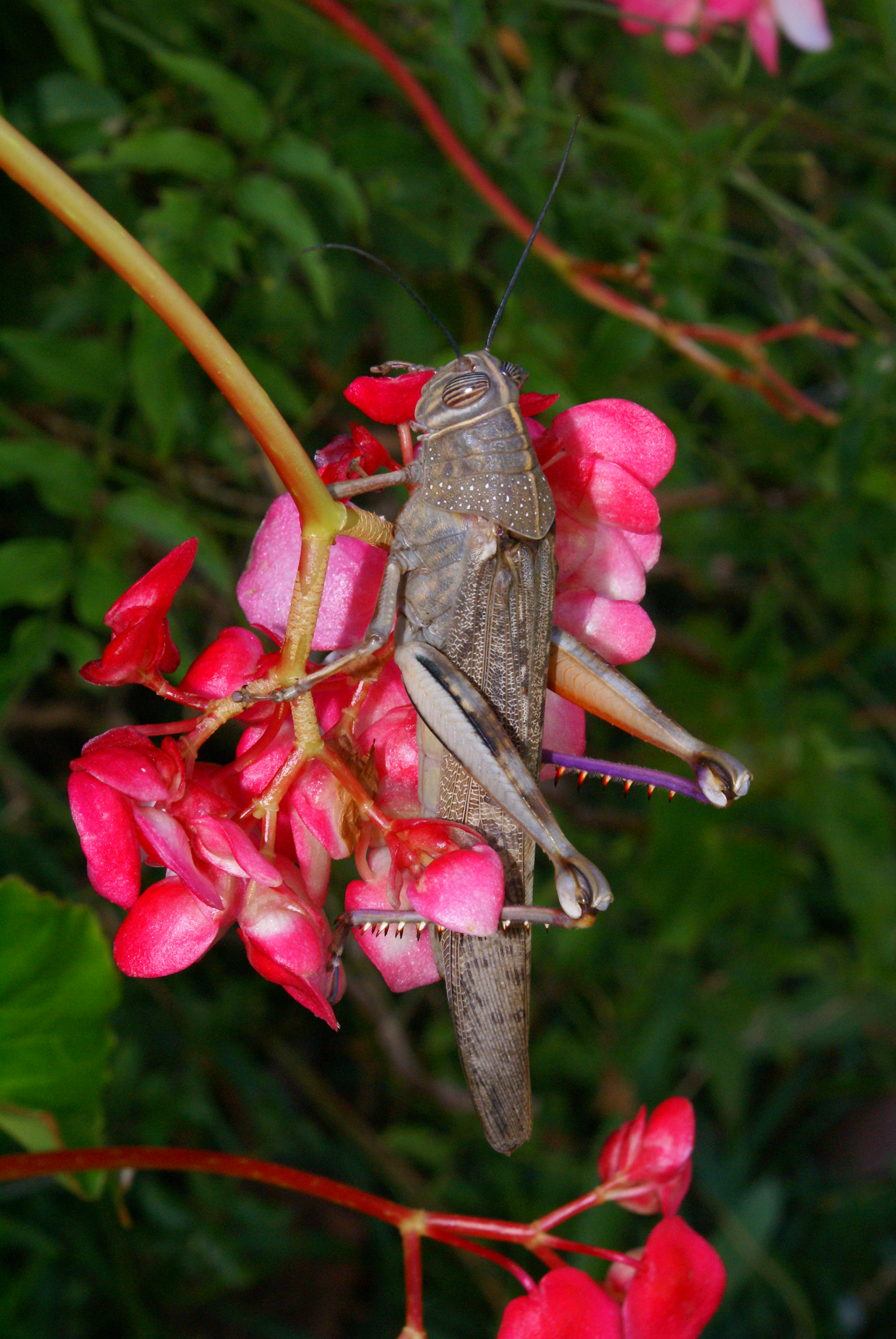
tree locust (Anacridium melanorhodon ssp. arabafrum) on Begonia sp. flowers, on Réunion island
