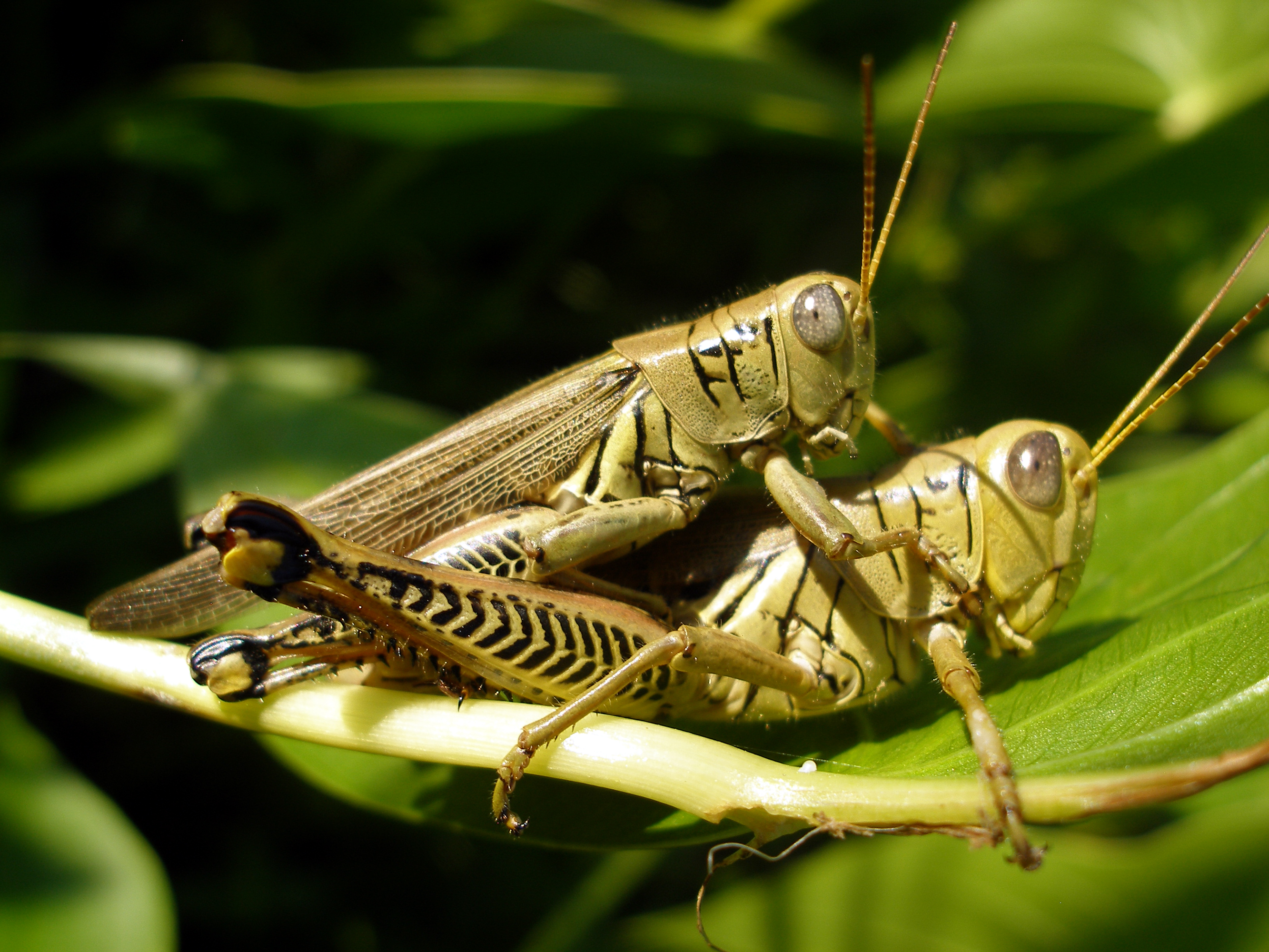
- Differential grasshoppers copulating

Scientific classification
- Kingdom: Animalia
- Phylum: Arthropoda
- Clade: Pancrustacea
- Class: Insecta
- Order: Orthoptera
- Suborder: Caelifera
- Family: Acrididae
- Genus: Melanoplus
- Species: M. differentialis

Binomial name
- Melanoplus differentialis (Thomas, 1865)

Subspecies
- M. d. differentialis (Thomas, 1865); M. d. nigricans Cockerell, 1917

= Differential grasshopper =

Species of grasshopper

The differential grasshopper (Melanoplus differentialis) is a species of grasshopper belonging to the genus Melanoplus. It is found throughout northern Mexico, the central United States and southern Ontario, Canada. It is considered a pest over most of its range.

== Description ==
Adult males grow to 28–37 mm, and females grow to 34–50 mm. They are brownish or greenish, and as they age the color will darken. Some nymphs can be bright yellow. There are black grooves on the pronotum. The male has bootlike appendages at the end of its abdominal tip. There are inverted chevrons along the hind femur, and the hind part of the tibia is yellowish with black spikes. All adults have yellow tarsi and antennae, or in some cases reddish-yellow antennae.

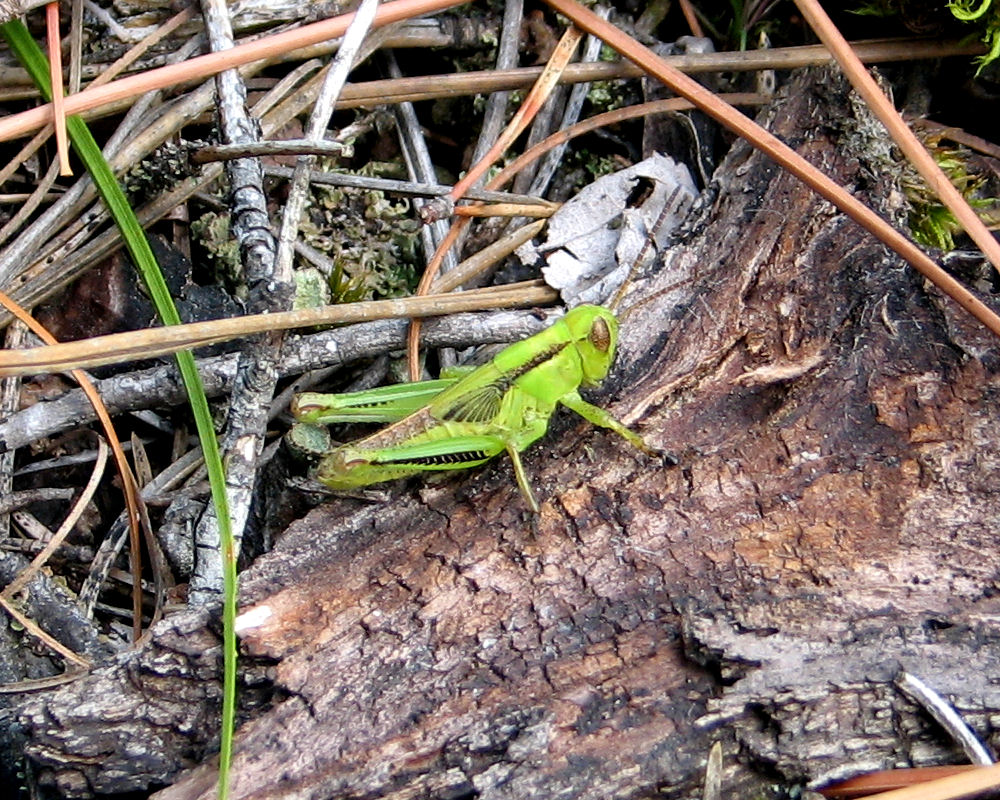
M. d. differentialis juvenile (4th or 5th instar; Ottawa, Ontario)

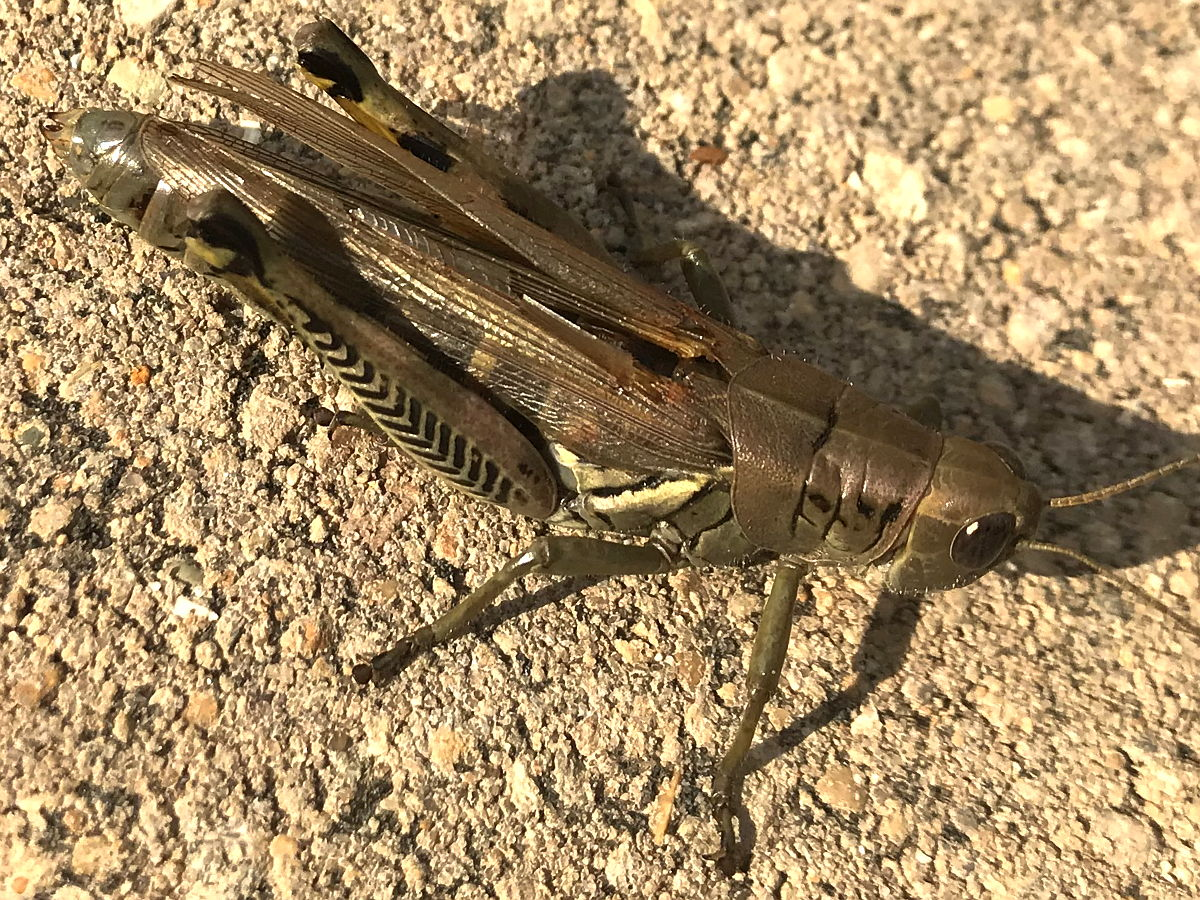
Gravid female (Naperville, Illinois)

Female ovipositing in soil (Naperville, Illinois)

== Range and habitat ==
The differential grasshopper is found throughout most of the United States, except for the northwest. Within its range, it is most often found in heavily weeded areas and grasslands, and even in vacant lots and other urban areas. This species is not migratory, but can travel a few miles to search for food. In the northern part of its range, M. differentialis is about as numerous as the two-striped grasshopper (Melanoplus bivittatus), but in the southern part of its range greatly outnumbers it.

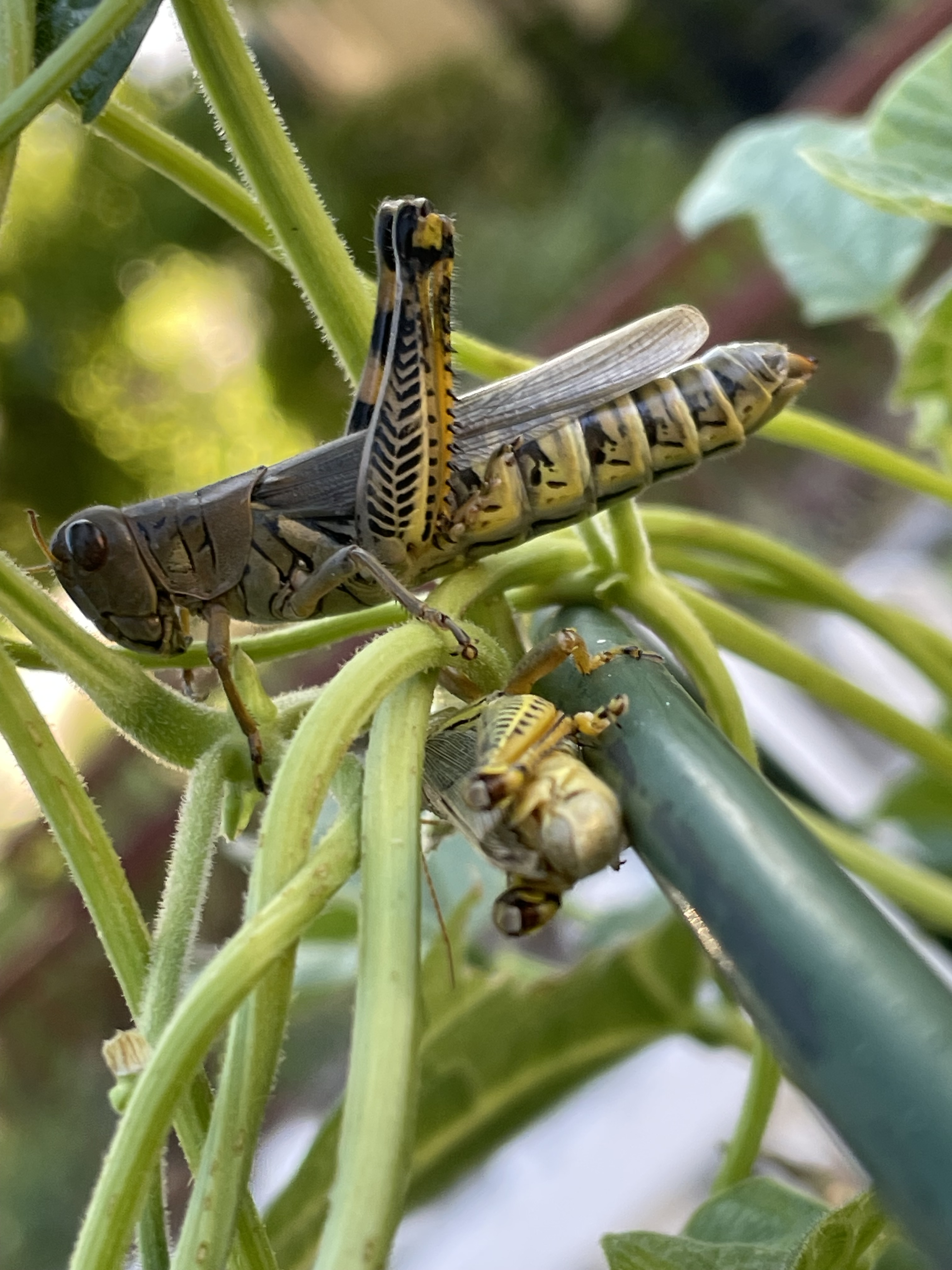
Two differential grasshoppers in a garden in Salt Lake City, Utah

== Life cycle ==
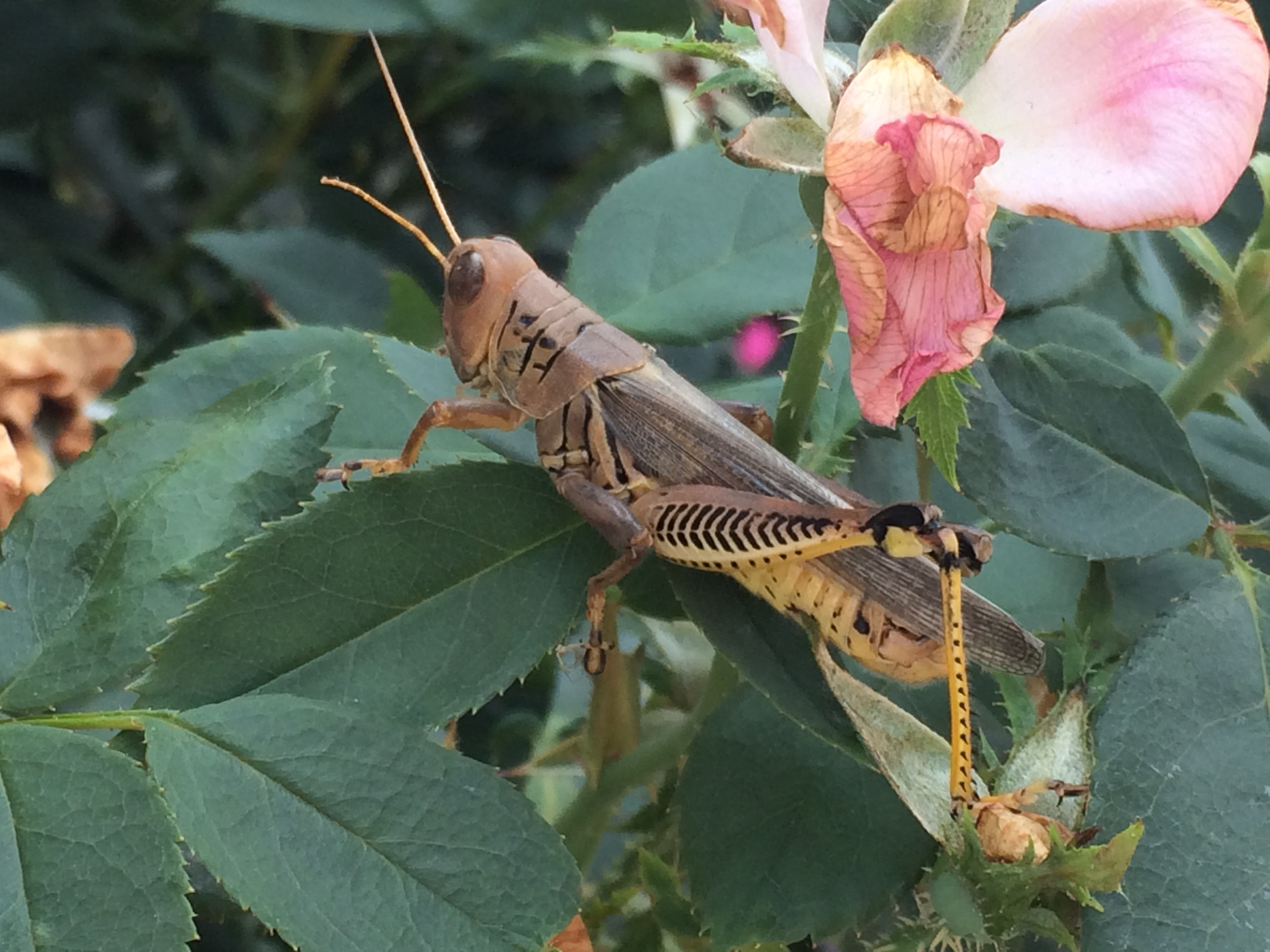
Differential grasshopper in Arlington, Texas

There is one generation per year. An adult female lays up to six egg masses in soft soil, each of which can contain 40–200 eggs. The eggs begin embryonic development the summer they are laid, then enter diapause for the winter, to hatch over a period of about two weeks in early summer of the next year. After hatching, nymphs take about 32 days to reach adulthood. Their development is well synchronized, and most nymphs transform to winged adults during a period of just a few days. Differential grasshoppers are polyphagous, eating both grasses and forbs, but experiments have shown that they grow faster if fed forbs. The most favored food plants tend to be giant ragweed (Ambrosia trifida), common sunflower (Helianthus annuus), and prickly lettuce (Lactuca serriola). Adults can detect a chemical change in wilted lettuce and sunflowers, and will tend to avoid such plants.

== Agricultural impact ==
The young grasshoppers feed on various grain, alfalfa and hay crops, while adults attack corn, cotton and deciduous fruit crops. A single swarm can destroy a crop in a few days. Because this species tends to feed in large swarms, it can be a serious threat to farming over most of its range.

In smaller numbers, or in urban regions, differential grasshoppers frequently feed on garden vegetables, such as tomatoes, peas, various kinds of squash, and the leaves of those plants.
