= List of animal names =

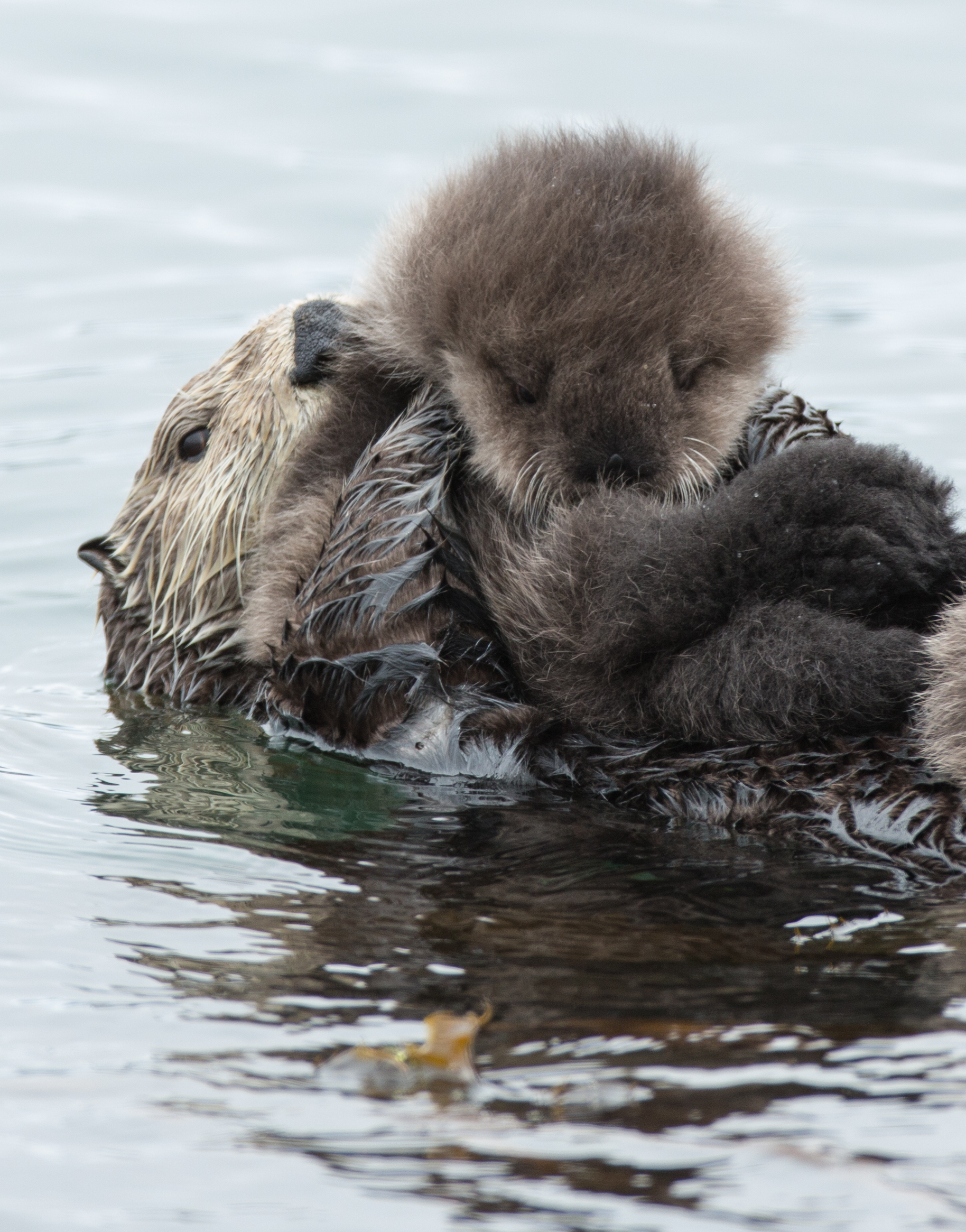
Mother sea otter with sleeping pup, Morro Bay, California

In the English language, many animals have different names depending on whether they are male, female, young, domesticated, or in groups.

The best-known source of many English words used for collective groupings of animals is The Book of Saint Albans, an essay on hunting published in 1486 and attributed to Juliana Berners. Most terms used here may be found in common dictionaries and general information web sites.

== Generic terms ==
The terms in this table apply to many or all taxa in a particular biological family, class, or clade.

Scientific term	Trivial name	Young	Female	Male	Collective noun	Collateral adjective
Aves	bird	chick	hen	cock, rooster	flock	avian
Bovinae	cattle; ox, cow, kine (plural, dialectical)	calf	cow (bred); heifer (not bred)	bull (intact); bullock or steer (castrated)	herd	bovine
Caninae	dog	puppy, pup, cub, whelp	bitch	dog	pack	canine
Cetacea	whale, dolphin, porpoise	calf	cow	bull	pod herd (Note: While the terms pod and herd are often used interchangeably, pod is generally preferred for toothed whales and herd for baleen whales.)	cetacean
Equidae	horse	colt (male), filly (female), foal	jenny (asses); mare (other equids)	jack (asses); stallion (other equids); gelding (castrated horse)	herd	equine
Felidae	cat	kitten (non-big cats, such as Felis, Lynx, Puma, etc.); cub (big cats, Panthera, and also Puma)	queen	tom, king	clowder (small cats); pride (big cats)	feline
Suinae	pig	piglet	sow	boar	drift, drove	porcine, suine
Procyonidae	Raccoon family of Carnivorans	cub, kit	sow	boar	gaze, smack, committee	procyonid, procyonine
Viverridae	Civet family of Carnivorans	cub, kit	sow	boar	gaze, smack, committee	viverrid, viverrine
Mustelidae	Ferret family of Carnivorans (large: badgers & wolverines; small: weasels & ferrets)	kit	sow (large); jill (small)	boar (large); hob, jack (small)	colony (large); business (small)	mustelid, musteline
Leporidae	rabbits & hares	nestling	jill	jack	nest or band	leporid, leporine
Osteichthyes	bony fish	hatchling, fry, fingerling	—N/a	—N/a	school, shoal	piscine, ichthyic

== Terms by species or taxon ==
Animal	Young	Female	Male	Collective noun	Collateral adjective	Culinary noun for meat
A
Albatross	chick	—N/a	—N/a	flock gam (when searching for mates) rookery	diomedeid diomedeine	
Alligator	hatchling	cow	bull	congregation	—N/a	
Alpaca	cria	hembra	macho	herd	—N/a	
Ant	larva pupa	queen (fertile) soldier worker	drone	army bike colony bivouac (migratory feeders) nest swarm	formicid formicine	
Antelope	calf	doe	buck	cluster herd tribe	—N/a	
Ape	baby child infant	—N/a	—N/a	band family group shrewdness troop, group	simian	
Armadillo	baby pup	sow	boar	protection	cingulatan chlamyphorid chlamyphorine dasypodid dasypodine	
Ass/donkey	foal	jenny	jack	coffle drove herd pace	asinine	
B
Baboon	infant	babuina	—N/a	flange (Note: The term flange was originally used to denote a group of baboons in a Not the Nine O'Clock News comedy sketch entitled "Gerald the Intelligent Gorilla" where it was used for comic effect.) troop, group	—N/a	
Badger	cub kit	sow	boar	cete colony	mustelid musteline	
Bat	pup	—N/a	—N/a	camp cloud colony flock	vespertilionid vespertilionine	
Bear (list)	cub	she-bear sow	boar	sleuth sloth	ursid ursine	
Beaver	kit kitten pup	—N/a	—N/a	colony family	castorid castorine	
Bee	larva pupa	queen worker (Note: A worker bee is a sexually undeveloped female.)	drone	cast (a second swarm) cluster (of workers around the queen) colony drift erst grist hive nest rabble stand swarm	anthophilan apid apine	
Beetle	larva grub (wormlike forms) mealworm (darkling beetles) pupa	—N/a	—N/a	swarm colony	scarabaeid scarabaeine	
Binturong	binlet	—N/a	—N/a	—N/a	potosine	
Bison; See Cattle						
Boar/wild pig Also see Pig	farrow piglet shoat/shote (just weaned)	sow	boar hog	herd singular sounder (groups of 12 or more)	—N/a	
Bobcat	bobkitten	—N/a	—N/a	—N/a	feline	
Bull; See Cattle						
Butterfly	caterpillar chrysalis larva pupa	—N/a	—N/a	flight flutter kaleidoscope rabble swarm	papilionine	
C
Camel	calf	cow	bull	caravan flock herd train	—N/a	
Cardinal	—N/a	—N/a	—N/a	college conclave deeck radiance Vatican	—N/a	
Cat (list)	kit kitten	molly queen	gib (castrated male) king tom	clowder cluster clutter glaring kindle (kittens) litter (kittens) pillow (kittens) pounce nuisance	feline	
Cattle (Note: Castrated male cattle are steers in the United States or bullocks in the United Kingdom. Oxen are draft animals that are (if male) usually castrated but not necessarily. A young cow that has not given birth is a heifer. See Cattle for more names. Cows is often used informally to refer to cattle in general.) (list)	calf	cow heifer freemartin	bull bullock ox steer	drove gang herd obstinacy (buffaloes) team (oxen) troop yoke (oxen)	bovine (Note: Bovine refers to all species of genus Bos.) taurine (male) vaccine (female) vituline (young)	beef veal
Cheetah	cub kitten	—N/a	—N/a	coalition (male)	—N/a	
Chicken (list)	chick	hen pullet	capon (castrated male) cock cockerel rooster	brood clutch (eggs) flock peep (chicks)	galline	poultry
Chinchilla	kit	sow velvet	boar bull	colony	—N/a	
Chough	chick	—N/a	—N/a	chattering clattering	pyrrhocoracine	
Cobra	—N/a	—N/a	—N/a	quiver	elapid elapine	
Cockroach	nymph	—N/a	—N/a	intrusion	blattodean blattid blattine	
Cod	codling	—N/a	—N/a	school	gadid gadine	
Cormorant	chick shaglet	—N/a	—N/a	flight gulp	phalacrocoracid phalacrocoracine	
Cow; See Cattle						
Crab	zoea	hen jenny	cock jimmy	—N/a	brachyuran cancrine	
Crane	chick colt	—N/a	—N/a	herd sedge sege siege	alectorid alectorine	
Crocodile	hatchling	cow	bull	bask congregation float menace	suchian	
Crow	—N/a	—N/a	—N/a	murder	corvine	
D
Deer	calf fawn	doe hind cow	buck bull hart (red deer) stag	bunch herd mob rangale	cervid cervine	humble (organ meat) venison
Dog (list)	pup puppy whelp	bitch	dog sire stud	comedy (boxers) cowardice (curs) cry (hounds) kennel litter (young) mute pack (wild)	canid canine	
Dogfish; Also see Shark	—N/a	—N/a	—N/a	troop	selachian squaloid	capeshark (US) flake (UK, Australia) huss (UK) kahada (Canada) rigg (UK) rock salmon (UK) spiny dogfish
Dolphin	calf	cow	bull	herd pod school team	delphine	
Donkey (list); See Ass						
Dove	chick	hen	cock	arc cote dole dule flight piteousness pitying	columbid columbine	
Duck (list); Also see Mallard	duckling	duck hen	cock drake	badling (on land) brace (on land) bunch (on water) flock (on land) herd (on land) paddling (on water) raft (on water) safe (on land) skein (in flight) sord (on land) sore (on land) string (in flight) team (in flight) waddling (on land)	anatid anatine	poultry
Dunlin	chick	—N/a	—N/a	fling	scolopacid scolopacine	
E
Eagle	eaglet fledgling	—N/a	—N/a	convocation	aquiline accipitrid accipitrine	
Echidna	puggle	—N/a	—N/a	—N/a	tachyglossid tachyglossine	
Eel	leptocephalus (larva) elver (juvenile)	—N/a	—N/a	bed swarm	anguillid anguilline	
Elephant	calf	cow	bull	herd memory parade	pachyderm proboscidean proboscine	
Elk/wapiti	calf	cow	bull	gang herd	—N/a	venison
Emu	chick hatchling	—N/a	—N/a	mob	—N/a	
F
Falcon	eyass/eyas	falcon	tercel terzel tiercel	cast	—N/a	
Ferret	kit	jill	hob	business busyness	mustelid musteline	
Finch	chick	hen	cock	charm	fringilline	
Flamingo	chick	—N/a	—N/a	flamboyance stand	phoenicopterid phoenicopterine	
Fly	maggot	—N/a	—N/a	business cloud swarm	muscid muscine	
Fox	cub kit pup	vixen	dog reynard tod	leash skulk earth	vulpine	
Frog	froglet polliwog tadpole	—N/a	—N/a	army	ranid ranine	
G
Gecko	hatchling	dam (herpetoculture)	sire (herpetoculture)	—N/a	—N/a	
Gerbil	pup	doe	buck	horde	—N/a	
Giant panda	cub	sow	boar	embarrassment sleuth	ailuropodid ailuropodine	
Giraffe	calf	cow	bull	corps herd tower	—N/a	
Gnat	larva	—N/a	—N/a	cloud horde rabble swarm	—N/a	
Gnu	calf	cow	bull	herd implausibility	—N/a	
Goat (list)	kid	doe doeling nanny	billy buck buckling wether (castrated)	herd flock tribe trip trippe	caprid caprine	cabrito chevon mutton
Goldfinch	—N/a	—N/a	—N/a	charm	cardueline	
Goosander	—N/a	—N/a	—N/a	dopping	—N/a	
Goose	gosling	goose	gander	chevron (in flight) flock (on land) gaggle (on land) plump (on land) skein (in flight) team (in flight) wedge (in flight)	anatid anatine anserine	poultry
Gorilla	infant	—N/a	blackback silverback	band troop, group whoop	—N/a	
Goshawk	—N/a	—N/a	—N/a	flight	—N/a	
Grasshopper	nymph	—N/a	—N/a	cloud swarm	caeliferian	
Grouse	—N/a	—N/a	—N/a	covey pack	tetraonid tetraonine	
Guanaco	chulengo	—N/a	—N/a	herd	—N/a	
Guinea fowl	keet	hen	cock	flock rasp	numidid numidine	poultry
Guinea pig	pup	sow	boar	herd	—N/a	cuy
H
Hamster	pup	doe	buck	horde	cricetid cricetine	
Hare	leveret	doe jill	buck jack	band down drove flick husk	leporine	
Hawk	eyas	hen	tiercel	aerie (Note: The term aerie is a classic 15th-century term of venery that refers to only two "hawks of the tower" but, in modern usage, does not necessarily have the same numerical constraint. Aerie also refers to hawks and other birds of prey nesting high on a mountain top. Confusingly, hawks of the tower are technically falcons and not hawks.) boil (soaring in large groups) cast (Note: The term cast is a classic 15th-century term of venery that refers to only two "hawks of the tower" but, in modern usage, does not necessarily have the same numerical constraint. Confusingly, hawks of the tower are technically falcons and not hawks.) cauldron (soaring in large groups) flight (Note: The term flight is a classic 15th-century term of venery that refers to only "hawks of the wrist" to include goshawks and sparrowhawks. Hawks of the wrist are true hawks in the genus Accipiter.) flock kettle (soaring in large groups) leash (Note: The term leash is a classic 15th-century term of venery that refers to only three "hawks of the tower" but, in modern usage, does not necessarily have the same numerical constraint. Confusingly, hawks of the tower are technically falcons and not hawks.) staff (Note: The term staff is a classic 15th-century term of venery that refers to only three "hawks of the tower" but, in modern usage, does not necessarily have the same numerical constraint. Confusingly, hawks of the tower are technically falcons and not hawks.)	accipitrine	
Hedgehog	hoglet piglet pup	sow	boar	array	erinaceine	
Heron	chick	hen	cock	flight sedge sege siege	ardeid ardeine	
Herring	sild	—N/a	—N/a	army glean shoal	clupeid clupeine	
Hippopotamus	calf	cow	bull	bloat herd podschool	—N/a	
Hornet	larva pupa	queen	drone	bike nest swarm	vespid vespine	
Horse (list)	colt (male) filly (female) foal weanling yearling	dam mare	gelding (castrated male) ridgling stallion (not castrated) stud	band (wild horses) field (racehorses) harras herd (wild horses) rag (colts) stable string (ponies) stud team (work horses)	caballine equid equine	horseflesh horsemeat
Human	baby boy (male) child girl (female) infant	lady (colloquial) woman	gentleman (colloquial) man	band clan crowd family group horde tribe	—N/a	“long pig” the flesh that speaks
Hyena	cub	—N/a	—N/a	cackle clan	—N/a	
J
Jaguar	cub	—N/a	—N/a	leap parade prowl shadow	—N/a	
Jay	chick	hen	cock	band party scold	corvid corvine	
Jellyfish	ephyra planula polyp	—N/a	—N/a	bloom brood fluther smack smuth	medusozoan	
Junglefowl (see chicken)						
K
Kangaroo	joey	doe flyer jill roo	boomer buck jack	court herd mob troop	macropodine	
Kingbird	chick	—N/a	—N/a	court tyranny coronation	—N/a	
Kinkajou	kit pup	sow	boar	convergence troop	potosine	
Koala	joey	doe	buck	—N/a	phascolarctid phascolarctine	
L
Ladybug	larva	—N/a	—N/a	loveliness	coccinellid coccinelline	
Lapwing	chick	—N/a	—N/a	deceit desert	vanelline	
Lark	chick	hen	cock	exaltation	alaudine	
Lemur	infant	—N/a	—N/a	conspiracy	—N/a	
Leopard	cub	leopardess	—N/a	leap lepe	—N/a	
Lion	cub	lioness	—N/a	pride sawt	leonine	
Lizard	hatchling	—N/a	—N/a	—N/a	—N/a	
Llama	cria	dam hembra	macho stud	flock herd	—N/a	
Lobster	—N/a	hen	cock	risk	nephropoid nephropid nephropine	
Locust (list)	nymph	—N/a	—N/a	cloud host swarm	caeliferan	
Lyrebird	chick	hen	cock	musket	menurine	
M
Mallard; Also see Duck	duckling	hen	greenhead	sord suit	anatid anatine	poultry
Meerkat	meerkitten	—N/a	—N/a	—N/a	herpestine	
Mole	pup	sow	boar	labor	talpine	
Mongoose	pup	—N/a	—N/a	committee delegation troop	hespertid herpestine	
Monkey	infant	—N/a	—N/a	group, troop	simian	
Moose	calf	cow	bull	herd	alceine	venison
Mosquito	nymph tumbler wriggler	—N/a	—N/a	cloud scourge swarm	culicid culicine	
Moth	caterpillar chrysalis larva pupa	—N/a	—N/a	eclipse swarm	lepidopteran	
Mouse	pup	doe	buck	colony nest	murid murine	
N
Narwhal	calf	cow	bull	pod herd school gam grind	cetacean cetaceous monodontid monodontine	
Newt	eft	—N/a	—N/a	—N/a	pleurodeline	
Nightingale	chick	hen	cock	watch	philomelian	
O
Octopus	paralarva	—N/a	—N/a	shoal	—N/a	
Opossum	joey	jill	jack	passel	didelphid didelphine	
Otter	pup whelp	sow	boar	family romp	lutrine	
Ox; See Cattle						
Owl	fledgling owlet	—N/a	—N/a	parliament	strigid strigine	
Oyster	spat	—N/a	—N/a	bed	ostreoid ostreid ostreine	
P
Panda; See Giant panda						
Partridge	chick	chantelle hen	cock	covey roost	pavonine phasianine rolluline	
Peafowl	chick peachick	peahen	peacock	ostentation	pavonine	poultry
Peccary	—N/a	—N/a	—N/a	squadron	—N/a	
Pelican	chick nestling	—N/a	—N/a	pod scoop	—N/a	
Penguin	chick nestling	—N/a	—N/a	colony huddle raft (in water) rookery tuxedo waddle (on land)	spheniscid spheniscine	
Pheasant	chick	hen	cock	bouquet flock nest nide nye	phasianid phasianine	
Pig (list); Also see Boar	farrow piglet shoat/shote (just weaned)	gilt (not bred) sow (bred)	barrow (castrated) boar hog	drift drove litter (piglets) sounder (older pigs) team (older pigs)	porcine suine	bacon ham pork
Pigeon (list)	squab squeaker	hen	cock	flight flock kit	columbid columbine	squab
Platypus	—N/a	—N/a	—N/a	paddle	ornithorhynchid ornithorhynchine	
Polar bear	cub	sow	boar	aurora celebration pack	—N/a	
Pony; See Horse						
Porcupine	pup, porcupette	sow	boar	prickle	hystricine hystricid erethizontid erethizontine	
Prairie dog	pup	sow	boar	town	cynomurid cynomurine	
Pug	pup	bitch	dog sire stud	grumble	—N/a	
Q
Quail	chick	hen	cock	bevy	phasianid phasianine	
R
Rabbit (list)	bunny kit kitten nestling	doe jill	buck jack yoyo	litter (young) nest warren wrack (young)	leporid leporine	
Raccoon	cub kit	sow	boar	brace committee gaze nursery smack troop	procyonid procyonine	
Ram; Also see Sheep	lamb	ewe	ram	flock	arietine ovine	lamb mutton
Rat (list)	kitten pup	doe	buck	colony horde mischief	murid murine	
Raven	chick	hen	cock	conspiracy unkindness	corvid corvine	
Rhinoceros	calf	cow	bull	crash herd	—N/a	
Rook	—N/a	—N/a	—N/a	building parliament	—N/a	
S
Salamander	larva	—N/a	—N/a	maelstrom	caudatan salamandrid salamandrine	
Salmon	parr	hen jen	cock jack	—N/a	—N/a	
Sand dollar	juvenile (young urchin) larva pluteus (free-swimming stage)	—N/a	—N/a	—N/a	clypeasteroid clypeasterid clypeasterine	
Sandpiper	—N/a	—N/a	—N/a	fling	scolopacid scolopacine	
Sardine	—N/a	—N/a	—N/a	family	—N/a	
Seahorse	seafoal	seamare	seastallion	shoal	hippocampine	
Seal	pup	cow	bull	herd pod rookery	pinnipedian phocid phocine	
Sea otter	pup	—N/a	—N/a	raft	lutrine	
Sea urchin	—N/a	—N/a	—N/a	herd	—N/a	uni
Shark	cub pup	—N/a	bull	shiver	selachian squaloid	flake (AUS)
Sheep (list); Also see Ram	cosset lamb lambkin	dam ewe	buck ram wether (castrated)	flock fold herd	ovine	hogget lamb mutton
Skunk	kit	sow	boar	surfeit	mephitid mephitine	
Snail	—N/a	—N/a	—N/a	escargatoire rout walk	gastropodine	escargot
Snake (list)	hatchling (newly hatched) neonate (newborn) snakelet	—N/a	—N/a	ball nest slither	anguine elapine ophidian serpentine viperine	
Spider (list)	spiderling	—N/a	—N/a	cluster clutter	arachnid	
Spoonbill	chick	—N/a	—N/a	bowl	plataleine	
Squid	paralarva	—N/a	—N/a	shoal	teuthine	
Squirrel	kit kitten pup	doe	buck	scurry	sciurid sciurine	
Starfish	bipinnaria brachiolaria	—N/a	—N/a	asteroid galaxy	—N/a	
Starling	—N/a	—N/a	—N/a	chattering murmuration	sturnid sturnine	
Stingray	pup	—N/a	—N/a	fever	myliobatoid	
Swan	cygnet flapper	pen	cob	bevy flock lamentation wedge (in flight)	cygnine	
T
Termite	larva	—N/a	—N/a	colony nest swarm	—N/a	
Thrush	chick	—N/a	—N/a	—N/a	turdid turdine	
Tiger	cub whelp	tigress	—N/a	ambush streak	—N/a	
Toad	tadpole toadlet	—N/a	—N/a	knot	batrachian ranid ranine	
Toucan	chick	—N/a	—N/a	durante	ramphastid ramphastine	
Turkey (list)	poult	hen	gobbler jake (immature) stag tom	rafter	—N/a	poultry
Turtle	hatchling turtlet	—N/a	—N/a	bale	testudine chelonian	
W
Wallaby	joey	jill	jack	mob	—N/a	
Wasp	larva	queen worker	drone	colony hive nest swarm	vespine	
Weasel	kit pup	bitch doe jill	buck dog hub jack	gang sneak	mustelid musteline	
Whale	calf	cow	bull	gam pod school herd (baleen whales)	cetacean balaenine	blubber
Wildebeest	calf	cow	bull	confusion	connochaetine	
Wolf	cub pup puppy whelp	bitch she-wolf	dog	pack	canine lupine	
Wombat	joey	jill	jack	wisdom	vombatid vombatine	
Z
Zebra	colt (male) filly (female) foal	mare	stallion	cohort dazzle herd zeal	hippotigrine	

== Usage of collective nouns ==
Merriam-Webster writes that most terms of venery fell out of use in the 16th century, including a "murder" for crows. It goes on to say that some of the terms in The Book of Saint Albans were "rather fanciful", explaining that the book extended collective nouns to people of specific professions, such as a "poverty" of pipers. It concludes that for lexicographers, many of these do not satisfy criteria for entry by being "used consistently in running prose" without meriting explanation. Some terms that were listed as commonly used were "herd", "flock", "school", and "swarm".

Writing for Audubon, Nicholas Lund says that many such terms are not used in actuality. When he interviewed scientists who specialize in studying specific animals, they had not heard of these terms, such as a "bask" of crocodiles or "wisdom" of wombats, being applied in their fields. Lund noted that the common plural nouns for animals were "flock" for birds and "herd" for cows, conceding that for certain animals in small groups, there was currency in usage such as a "pod" of whales or "gaggle" of geese.

== See also ==
- Animal epithet
- Lists of animals
- List of animal sounds
- wikt:Appendix:Animals, a similar list on English Wiktionary
