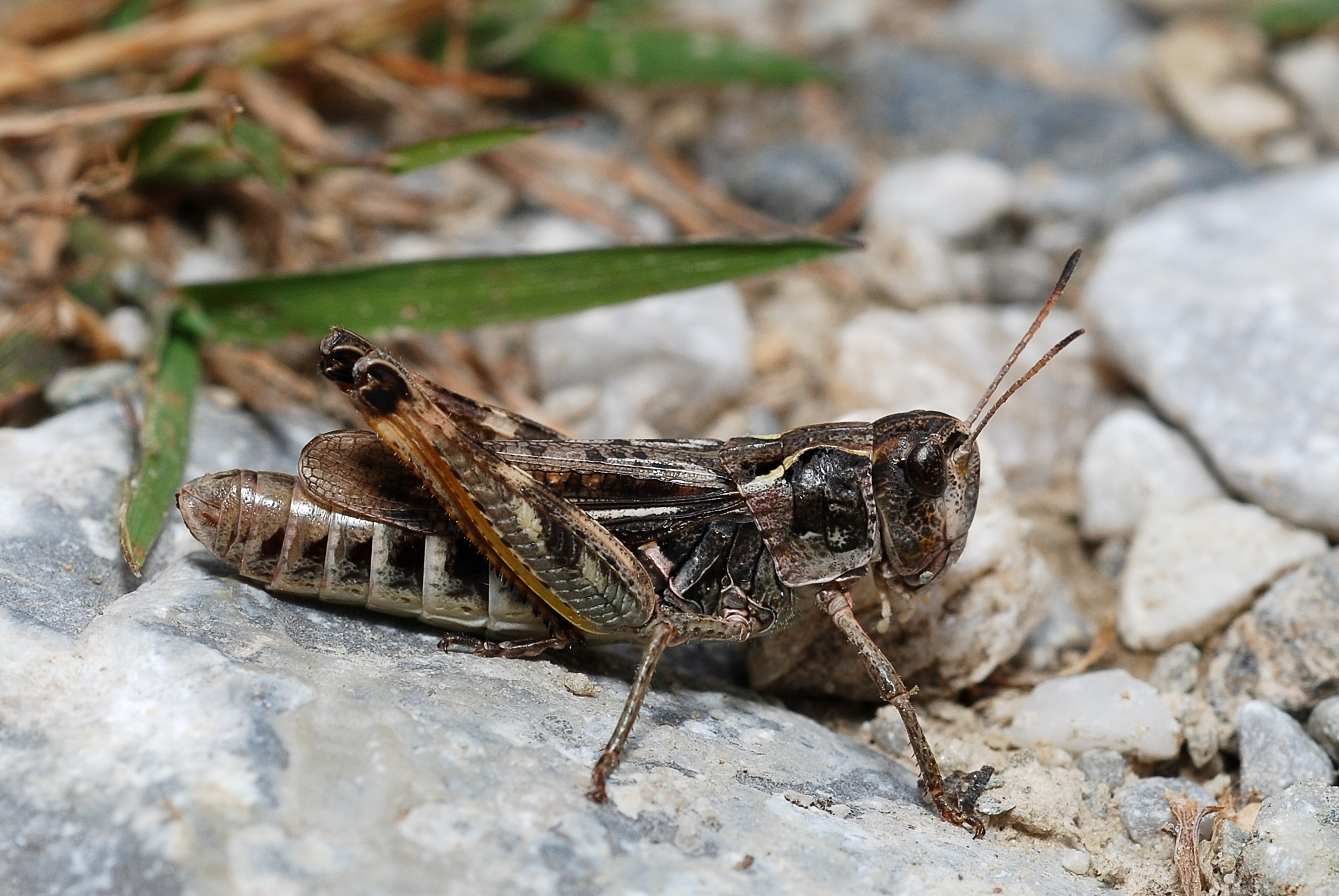
- Female in Belgium

Conservation status
- Least Concern (IUCN 3.1) (Europe regional assessment)

Scientific classification
- Kingdom: Animalia
- Phylum: Arthropoda
- Clade: Pancrustacea
- Class: Insecta
- Order: Orthoptera
- Suborder: Caelifera
- Family: Acrididae
- Genus: Gomphocerus
- Species: G. sibiricus

Binomial name
- Gomphocerus sibiricus (Linnaeus, 1767)

Synonyms
- Gryllus (Locusta) sibiricus Linnaeus, 1767; Aeropus sibiricus (Linnaeus, 1767)

= Gomphocerus sibiricus =

Species of grasshopper

Gomphocerus sibiricus is a species of insect belonging to the family Acrididae subfamily Gomphocerinae.It is found across the Palearctic east to Siberia.The main distribution area is Siberia. In Central and Southern Europe it is limited to the high mountains: Pyrenees and Sierra de Guadarrama, central and southern Apennines, Alps, Carpathians, Balkan Mountains and the Caucasus.

Close-Up
