= Ceracris kiangsu =

Scientific classification
- Kingdom: Animalia
- Phylum: Arthropoda
- Class: Insecta
- Order: Orthoptera
- Suborder: Caelifera
- Family: Acrididae
- Subfamily: Oedipodinae
- Tribe: Parapleurini
- Genus: Ceracris
- Species: C. kiangsu

Binomial name
- Ceracris kiangsu Tsai, P., 1929

Synonyms
- Rammeacris kiangsu (Tsai, P., 1929)

Species of grasshopper

External image
- Images at iNaturalist

Ceracris kiangsu is a species of grasshoppers in the subfamily Oedipodinae, sometimes called the yellow-spined bamboo locust. It occurs in Indo-China and southern China, where it may become a locally significant agricultural pest. No subspecies are listed in the Catalogue of Life.

Mud-puddling behaviour has been noted: these insects are attracted to the sodium and ammonium ions in human urine. Overwintering as eggs occurs for up to nine months prior to the grasshoppers hatching.
