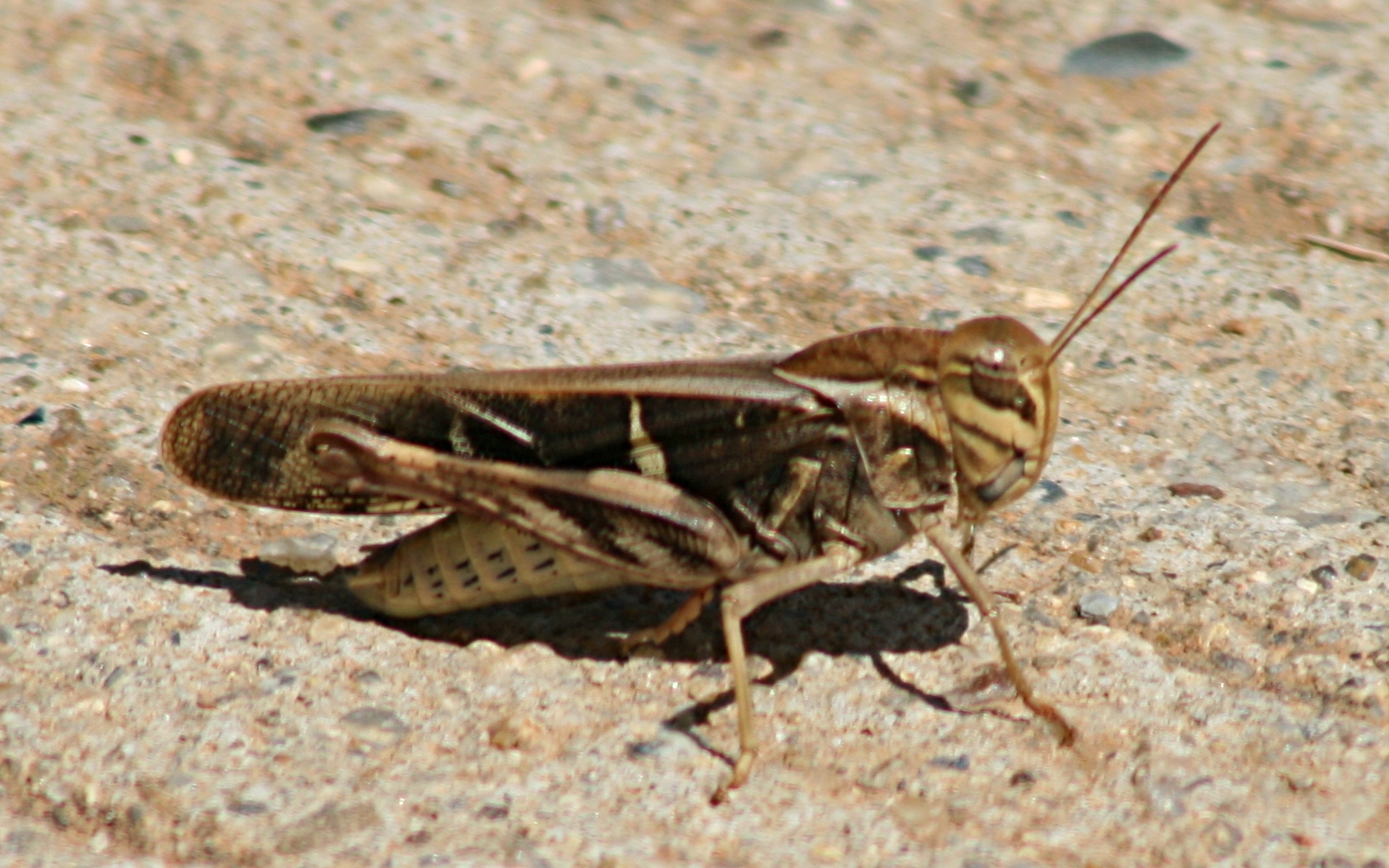

Scientific classification
- Domain: Eukaryota
- Kingdom: Animalia
- Phylum: Arthropoda
- Class: Insecta
- Order: Orthoptera
- Suborder: Caelifera
- Family: Acrididae
- Subfamily: Oedipodinae
- Tribe: Locustini
- Genus: Gastrimargus
- Species: G. musicus

Binomial name
- Gastrimargus musicus Fabricius, 1775

= Gastrimargus musicus =

Yellow-winged grasshopper

Species of grasshopper

Gastrimargus musicus, the yellow-winged locust or yellow-winged grasshopper, is a common grasshopper in Australia. It only displays its yellow back wings in flight, when it also emits a loud clicking or crackling sound. When swarming, the adults become dark brown.

They are sometimes confused with the Australian plague locust (Chortoicetes terminifera), though the yellow winged locust is "stouter and larger". In north Australian savannas it remains a solitary species.

Adult females range from 35 to 50 mm, while males are smaller ranging from 25 to 35 mm.

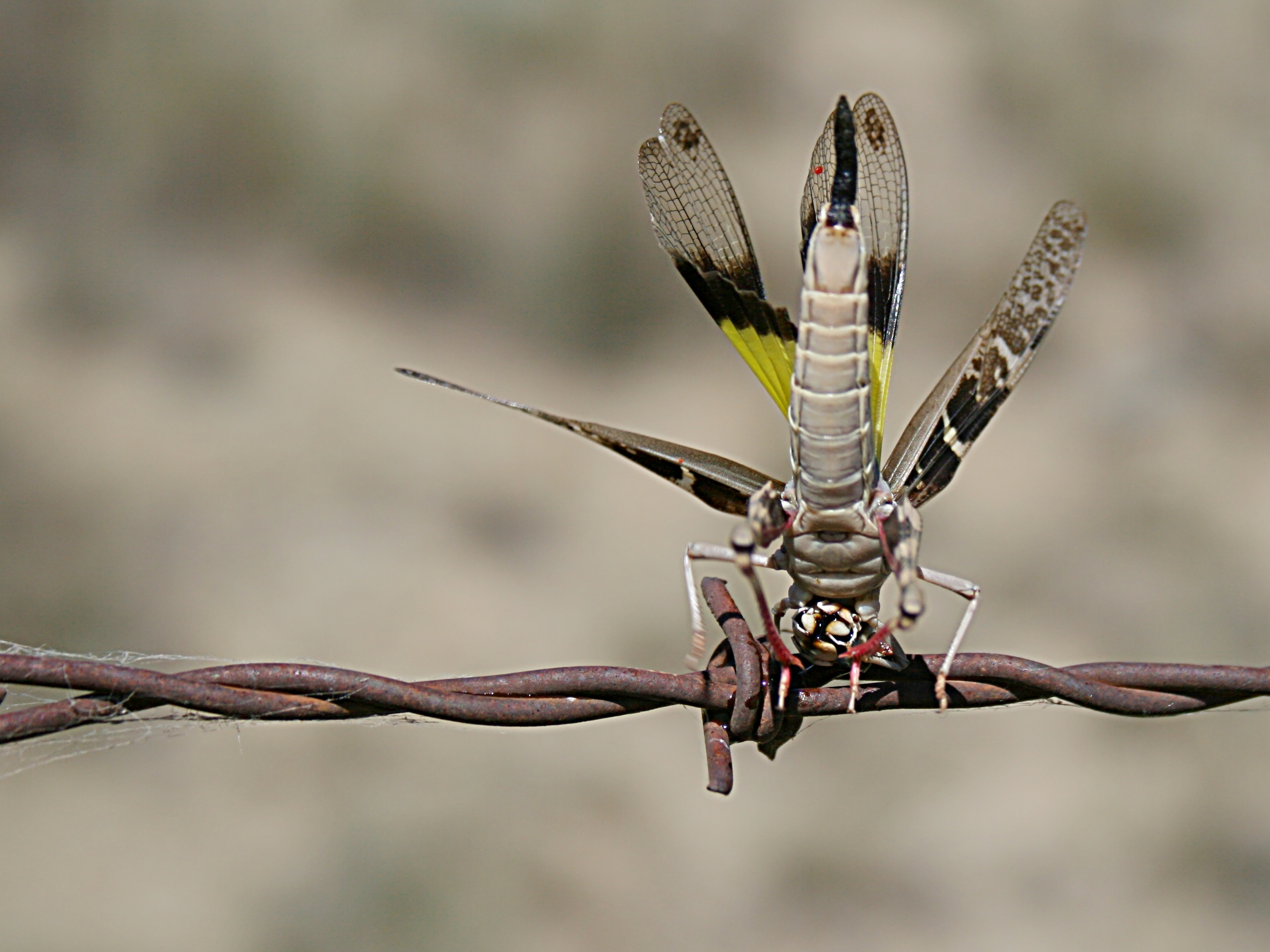
Grasshopper with its head stuck in a barbed wire fence displays its yellow back wings

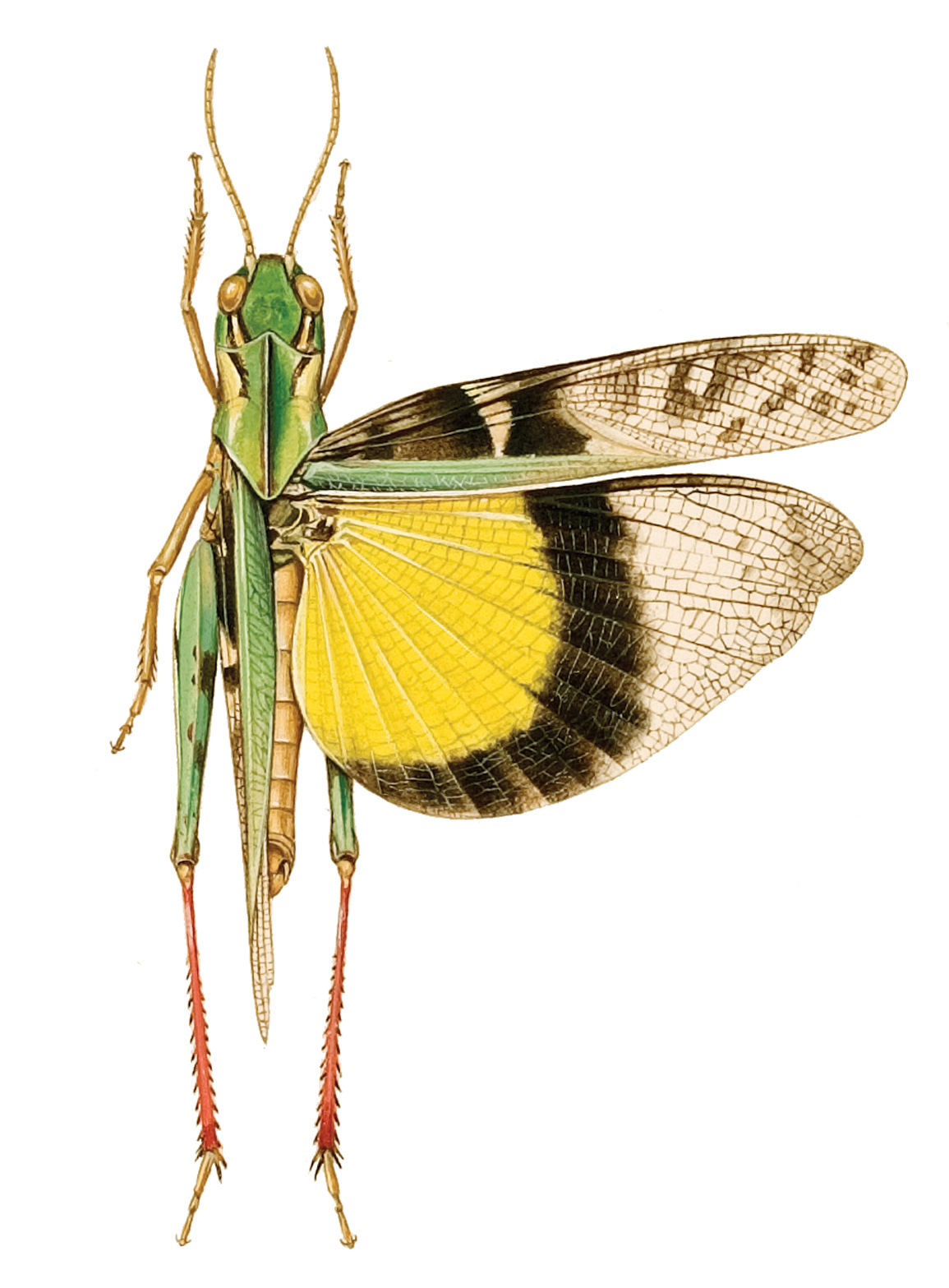
Illustration
