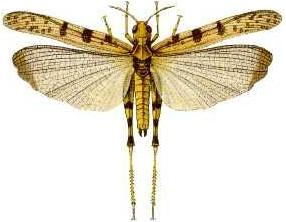
- Chortoicetes terminifera, the Australian plague locust

Scientific classification
- Domain: Eukaryota
- Kingdom: Animalia
- Phylum: Arthropoda
- Class: Insecta
- Order: Orthoptera
- Suborder: Caelifera
- Family: Acrididae
- Subfamily: Oedipodinae
- Genus: Chortoicetes; Brunner v. Wattenwyl, 1893

Synonyms
- Calataria Sjöstedt, 1921

= Chortoicetes =

Genus of grasshoppers

Chortoicetes is a genus of grasshoppers in the subfamily Oedipodinae and is notable for including the Australian plague locust.

== Species ==
The Orthoptera Species File lists:

1. Chortoicetes sumbaensis (Willemse, 1953) - (Sunda archipelago)
2. Chortoicetes terminifera (Walker, 1870) - type species (as Chortoicetes yorketownensis Brancsik)

A number of species using this genus name, have been brought to synonymy:

- Chortoicetes acutangulus, synonym of Heteropternis thoracica
- Chortoicetes affinis, synonym of Chortoicetes terminifera
- Chortoicetes albomarginatus, synonym of Gymnobothrus lineaalba
- Chortoicetes concolor, synonym of Austroicetes frater
- Chortoicetes corallipes, synonym of Austroicetes vulgaris
- Chortoicetes elegans, synonym of Chortoicetes terminifera
- Chortoicetes fallax, synonym of Gymnobothrus cruciatus
- Chortoicetes finitima, synonym of Austroicetes frater
- Chortoicetes frater, synonym of Austroicetes frater
- Chortoicetes interruptus, synonym of Oedaleus interruptus
- Chortoicetes jungi, synonym of Austroicetes cruciata
- Chortoicetes marginalis, synonym of Pycnostictus seriatus
- Chortoicetes montana, synonym of Austroicetes frater
- Chortoicetes pusillulus, synonym of Austroicetes pusilla
- Chortoicetes romeri, synonym of Gymnobothrus roemeri
- Chortoicetes subparallelus, synonym of Gymnobothrus lineaalba
- Chortoicetes tonnoiri, synonym of Austroicetes frater
- Chortoicetes tricolor, synonym of Austroicetes tricolor
- Chortoicetes vicina, synonym of Austroicetes pusilla
- Chortoicetes vittata, synonym of Austroicetes frater
- Chortoicetes vulgaris, synonym of Austroicetes vulgaris
- Chortoicetes yorketownensis, synonym of Chortoicetes terminifera
