= Autecology =

Study of interactions of individual organisms with the environment

Autecology is an approach in ecology that seeks to explain the distribution and abundance of species by studying interactions of individual organisms with their environments. An autecological approach differs from ecosystem ecology, community ecology (synecology) and population ecology (demecology) by greater recognition of the species-specific adaptations of individual animals, plants or other organisms, and of environmental over density-dependent influences on species distributions. Autecological theory relates the species-specific requirements and environmental tolerances of individuals to the geographic distribution of the species, with individuals tracking suitable conditions, having the capacity for migration at least at one stage in their life cycles. Autecology has a strong grounding in evolutionary theory, including the theory of punctuated equilibrium and the recognition concept of species.

== History ==
Autecology was pioneered by German field botanists in the late 19th century. During the 20th century, autecology continued to exist mainly as a descriptive science rather than one with supporting theory and the most notable proponents of an autecological approach, Herbert Andrewartha and Charles Birch, avoided the term autecology when referring to species-focused ecological investigation with emphasis on density-independent processes. Part of the problem with deriving a theoretical structure for autecology is that individual species are unique in their life history and behaviour, making it difficult to draw broad generalisations across them without losing the crucial information that is gained by studying biology at a species level. Progress has been made in more recent times with Paterson's recognition concept of species and the concept of habitat tracking by organisms. The most recent attempt at deriving a theoretical structure for autecology was published in 2014 by ecologists Gimme Walter and Rob Hengeveld.

== Basic theory ==
=== Recognition concept ===
Autecological theory is focused on species as the most important unit of biological organisation, as individuals across all populations of a particular species share species-specific adaptations that influence their ecology. This particularly relates to reproduction, as individuals of a sexual species share unique adaptations (e.g. courtship songs, pheromones) for recognising potential mates, and share a fertilisation mechanism that differs from those in all other species. This recognition concept of species differs from the biological species concept (or isolation concept) which defines species by cross-mating sterility, which in allopatric speciation is merely a consequence of adaptive change in a new species' fertilisation mechanism to suit a different environment.

=== Environmental matching ===
Individuals from across a species' range tend to be relatively uniform in terms of their dietary and habitat requirements and the range of environmental conditions they can tolerate. These differ from those of other species. Individuals of a species likewise share specific sensory adaptations for recognising suitable habitat. Seasonal changes and variability in climate mean that the spatial and/or temporal distribution of suitable habitat for a species also varies. In response, organisms track suitable conditions, for example by migrating in order to remain within suitable habitat, for which there is evidence in the fossil record. By determining the requirements and tolerances of a particular species, it is possible to predict how individuals of that species will respond to specific environmental changes

=== Population sizes and replacement level reproduction ===
Autecological theory predicts that populations will reproduce at around replacement level unless a period of environmental change causing unusually high or low survival causes the population to grow or shrink before restabilising at replacement level again. Population numbers may be reduced by introduction of new predation pressure, such as with poor fisheries management or introduction of a biological control agent to control an invasive species, such that net reproductive rate, R0, drops below replacement level. The species being preyed upon in each case may stabilise at a lower population density where it is more difficult for individuals of the higher trophic level to locate the prey species, but at this point relieving predation tends to make little difference to population size, as individuals continue to reproduce around replacement level as they were at a higher density prior to the introduction of a higher trophic level.

== Applications ==
=== Pest management ===
Pests include animals or agents that cause economic damage to cultivated crops. Pest management refers to the techniques and methods applied to control or minimize the damage to the crops done by pests. Pest management may include chemical, mechanical, biological or integrated approach. To apply any type of effective management programme, it is of utmost importance to know in detail about the particular pest species. Special study of the ecology of the pest provide necessary clues to its management.

=== Conservation autecology ===
Knowledge of species-level interactions, tolerances and habitat requirements is valuable for conservation of an endangered plant or animal species by ensuring its particular ecological requirements are met.

== Links to other fields ==
With focus on individual organism, autecology has mechanistic links to several other biological fields, including ethology, evolution, genetics and physiology
