= Austracris proxima =

Scientific classification
- Kingdom: Animalia
- Phylum: Arthropoda
- Class: Insecta
- Order: Orthoptera
- Suborder: Caelifera
- Superfamily: Acridoidea
- Family: Acrididae
- Subfamily: Cyrtacanthacridinae
- Genus: Austracris
- Species: A. proxima

Binomial name
- Austracris proxima (Walker, 1870)

Synonyms
- Cyrtacanthacris imitatrix Walker, 1870

Species of grasshopper

Austracris proxima is a species of grasshopper in the genus Austracris. It is found in Queensland and New South Wales.
