= Herbert Andrewartha =

Australian research scientist (1907–1992)

Professor Herbert George Andrewartha, BS (UWA), MAgSc (Melb), DSc (Adel), FAA, (21 December 1907 – 27 January 1992) was a distinguished Australian research scientist in the fields of entomology, biology, zoology and animal ecology.

== Early life ==
Andrewartha was born the second of three children, on 21 December 1907 in Perth, Western Australia to George and Elsie. His father was a teacher, and the family moved frequently from school to school with the education department, in rural Western Australia.

Andrewartha received his Bachelor of Agriculture from the University of Western Australia. He later received his doctorate from the University of Adelaide in 1972.

== Career ==
Andrewartha became the most influential Australian ecologist, best known for attributing density-independent forces, such as weather, to be even more important than density-dependent factors in influencing population regulation. In 1933, Andrewartha began his studies on apple thrips, Thrips imaginis, but later transitioned his studies to the plague grasshopper, Austroicetes, when he moved to Adelaide in 1935.

This led to his first publication with his former student Charles Birch in 1941, "The influence of weather on grasshopper plagues in South Australia". In 1945, when his mentor James Davidson died, Andrewartha inherited 15 years of data collected on thrips population. After several years of statistical analysis of that data, Andrewartha and Birch demonstrated strong connections between thrips physiology, population levels, and other environment factors. This led to the publication of two major books, The Distribution and Abundance of Animals (1954) and The Ecological Web (1984). Through this work, Andrewartha and Birch found a new school of population ecology, which emphasized the role of environmental controls as opposed to a community-dependent approach based on density-dependent factors. The joint work of Andrewartha and Birch earned them the "Eminent Ecologist Award" from the Ecological Society of America, which had never before been presented jointly to two persons

The following timeline depicts the scope of his employment, responsibilities and publications throughout his career—

- 1929 Entomologist in the Department of Agriculture of Western Australia
- 1933 Biologist, CSIR, Melbourne and worked the School of Agriculture and Forestry at the University of Melbourne
- 1935–1954 Entomologist at the Waite Agricultural Research Institute
- 1952 President of the Royal Society of South Australia (RSSA)
- 1954 The Distribution and Abundance of Animals published
- 1954–1962 Reader in Animal Ecology, University of Adelaide
- 1961 Introduction to the Study of Animal Populations published
- 1961 Fellow of the Australian Academy of Science (FAA)
- 1962–1972 Professor of Zoology, University of Adelaide (Emeritus Professor 1973)
- 1984 The ecological web : more on the distribution and abundance of animals published

== Significant work ==
- General theory of the distribution and abundance of animals
- The ecology of Thrips imaginis
- The ecology of Austroicetes cruciata
- Diapause, period of suspended development in an invertebrate, or mammal embryo, especially during poor environmental conditions
- The Queensland fruitfly Dacus tryoni

== Honours and awards ==
Andrewartha received many prestigious awards including the Clarke Medal from the Royal Society of New South Wales, Verco Medal from the Royal Society of South Australia, and the Gold Medal from Australian Ecological Society in 1987. He was President of the Nature Conservation Society of South Australia and Chairman of the National Parks and Wildlife Advisory Council of South Australia.

- 1954 David Syme Research Prize of the University of Melbourne (with Charles Birch)
- 1962 Verco Medal of the Royal Society of South Australia
- 1968 Clarke Medal of the Royal Society of New South Wales
- 1987 Gold Medal of the Australian Ecological Society
- 1988 Eminent Ecologist Award of the Ecological Society of America for 1988 to Andrewartha and Birch

== Publications ==
- 1954: The Distribution and Abundance of Animals. Chicago: University of Chicago Press (with Charles Birch)
- 1961: Introduction to the Study of Animal Populations. Chicago: University of Chicago Press; London: Methuen & Co ISBN 0-416-64030-3
- 1971: Introduction to the Study of Animal Populations, 2nd ed. Chicago: University of Chicago Press; London: Methuen & Co ISBN 0-226-02029-0 which includes additional information and adjustments.
- 1984: The Ecological Web. Chicago: University of Chicago Press ISBN 0-226-02033-9 (with Charles Birch)

== Retirement and death ==
Andrewartha retired in 1972. In 1975 he suffered a serious stroke, but continued writing his last book with Birch. He died on 27 January 1992 at the age of 84.

He married Harriett Vevers Steele, herself a trained entomologist, in Melbourne in 1935. Predeceased by his wife, Andrewartha was survived by his son Graeme and daughter Susan Dutch.

== Legacy ==
The HG Andrewartha Medal of the Royal Society of South Australia, was established to recognise outstanding research by an early-career, young Australian scientist.

Awards
Preceded by Spencer Smith-White	Clarke Medal; 1969	Succeeded by Samuel Warren Carey
