= Spur-throated grasshopper =

Spur-throated grasshopper may refer to several insects of the family Acrididae:

- Catantopinae, a subfamily
- Melanoplinae, a subfamily

== See also ==
- Spur-throated locust (Austracris guttulosa), an Australian species of insect
