= Fork-tailed drongo =

- D. a. adsimilis, Kruger National Park

Conservation status
- Least Concern (IUCN 3.1)

Scientific classification
- Kingdom: Animalia
- Phylum: Chordata
- Class: Aves
- Order: Passeriformes
- Family: Dicruridae
- Genus: Dicrurus
- Species: D. adsimilis

Binomial name
- Dicrurus adsimilis (Bechstein, 1794)

Audio
- Song of nominate subspecies, Southern Africa

Species of bird

The fork-tailed drongo (Dicrurus adsimilis), also called the common drongo or African drongo, is a small bird found from the Sahel to South Africa that lives in wooded habitats, particularly woodlands and savannas. It is part of the family Dicruridae and has four recognized subspecies, D. a adsimilis, D. a. apivorus, D. a. fugax and D. a. jubaensis. Like other drongos, the fork-tailed is mostly insectivorous; its diet mainly consists of butterflies, termites, and grasshoppers.

Physically, this species is characterized with a narrow fork-shaped tail, red-brownish eyes, and black plumage throughout all of its body. These birds nest close to wetlands, forests, and farms and the breeding season varies depending the region. The female usually lays one to four eggs, which hatch in 15 to 18 days.

The fork-tailed drongo is known for its ability to deceptively mimic other bird alarm calls in order for a certain animal to flee the scene so it can steal their food (kleptoparasitism). They are also known for their aggressive and fearless behavior, often attacking and driving away much larger animals, including birds of prey, when their nest is in danger. Due to its extensive range and stable population, the fork-tailed drongo is classified by the IUCN Red List as a least-concern species.

== Taxonomy ==
The fork-tailed drongo was described by Johann Matthäus Bechstein in 1794. Its populations are genetically distinct, and four races are usually accepted, though as of 2023, D. a. divaricatus and D. a. lugubris are included within the taxon by the IOC. The races D. a. modestus, together with D. a. coracinus and D. a. atactus are usually split as a separate species, the velvet-mantled drongo, D. modestus (Hartlaub, 1849).

- Dicrurus adsimilis apivorus Clancey, 1976

Range: Gabon, Congo Republic, DRC, Angola, northwestern Zambia, Namibia, Botswana and northwestern South Africa;
Description: primary remiges with brown outer vanes and pale inner vanes (noticeable while perched and in flight respectively);

- Dicrurus adsimilis fugax W.K.H.Peters, 1868

Range: Uganda, Kenya, Tanzania and Zanzibar, southeastern Zambia, Malawi, Mozambique, Zimbabwe, Botswana, eastern Eswatini and northeastern South Africa;
Description: Smaller than nominate, outer vanes of primaries brown, inner vanes dark, deeply forked tail.

- Dicrurus adsimilis adsimilis (Bechstein, 1794)

Range: western Eswatini, Lesotho and eastern to southern South Africa;
Description: Darker remiges, especially noticeable in flight.

- Dicrurus adsimilis jubaensis van Someren, 1931

Range: Ethiopia, Eritrea, and Somalia;
Description: smaller than nominate, less forked tail and body is gloss greenish blue.

- Dicrurus adsimilis divaricatus Lichtenstein, 1823

Range: Southwestern Mauritania south to Guinea, east to southeastern Niger and northeastern Nigeria;
Description: pale inner webs to the flight feathers, the tail fork is shallower.

- Dicrurus adsimilis lugubris Hemprich & Ehrenberg, 1828

Range: Southwestern Chad east to Ethiopia, Eritrea, and Somalia, south to northern Democratic Republic of the Congo, northern Uganda, and northern Kenya.

== Distribution and habitat ==
The fork-tailed drongo is a common and widespread resident breeder in Africa south of the Sahara. This insect-eating bird is usually found in open woodland, savanna and forest edge and is tolerant of arid climates. Its range was formerly considered to include Asia, but the Asian species is now called the black drongo (D. macrocercus). The bird can be found at heights as high as 2200 meters.

== Description ==
The bird possesses a robust black beak and red eyes. When born, they lack feathers, exhibiting reddish skin, an orange beak, yellow gape flange, brown eyes, and a black beak. Juvenile fork-tailed drongos are dark brown tone with some buff-colored feather tips, a less pronounced tail fork, brown or grey eyes, and a pale mouth. While resembling adults, they lack the glossy shine on the lower body and display pale feathers on certain areas. Both sexes share a black body with a blue-green iridescence in specific regions. The underside, including the belly, is uniformly black, contrasting with the glossy black-blue upper body. Their lengthy tail is deeply forked and black, measuring approximately 115–126 mm in length and 19–23 mm in depth. They feature short legs and a wingspan of 134 mm. Their bill is characterized by a depth of 0.4 mm and a length of 2.8 mm.

Following breeding, adult birds experience a complete molt, usually taking place between December and March in Southern Africa, with varying months in other areas. Young birds maintain their immature plumage until the next breeding season. The partial post-juvenile molt initiates prior to the growth of new wing and tail feathers following the nesting period. Instances of leucism have been observed in the fork-tailed drongo.

=== Vocalizations ===
This bird is notably vocal, often commencing the dawn chorus and often is the last heard at dusk. Their pre-dawn calls comprise variations such as jwaaa-jwaaa and jeewy-jeeerr. They exhibit a diverse repertoire of vocalizations, ranging from sharp calls, brief whistles, and squeaks to fluid, raspy, and scratchy notes delivered rapidly or with extended pauses. Their repertoire includes calls like chyup, tjaaa, the resounding jer-woo, and the whistled jee-lu. Mated pairs participate in coordinated duets lasting 4–5 minutes. Their songs feature soft, high-pitched, nasal, or melodious whistles, chirps, grinding sounds, and liquid chattering.

These birds produce specific drongo calls and mimic other bird species such as bocage's bushshrike, thrushes, tchagras, bulbuls, birds of prey and owls. They have also been observed imitating the mewings of cats and the alarm calls of meerkats.

== Behavior ==
=== Feeding ===
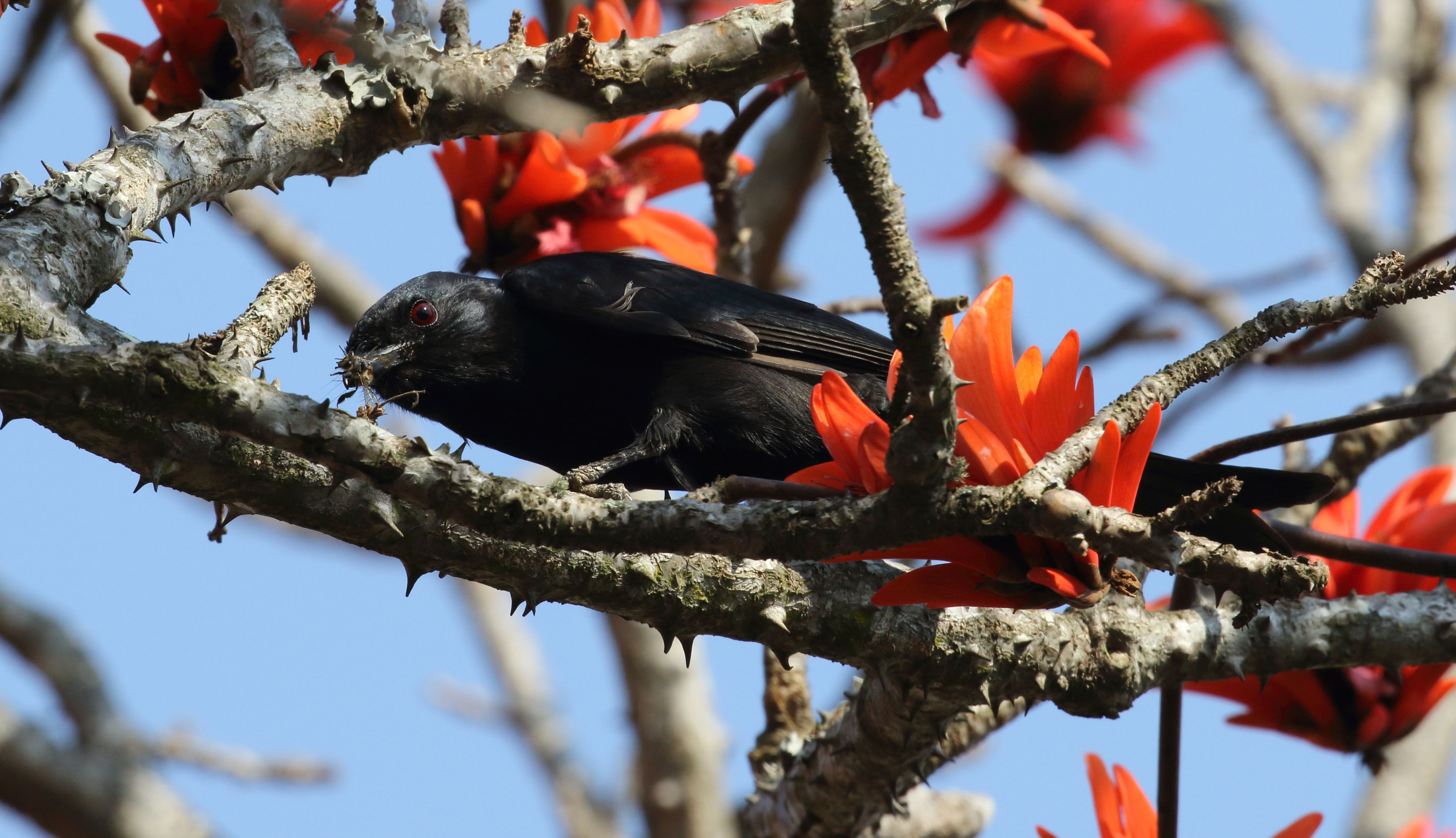
Foraging for insects

This species is mostly insectivorous and occasionally eats fishes and other birds, furthermore they may take nectar and eat plants when available too. Predominant preyed animals are butterflies, beetles, caterpillars, grasshoppers, honey bees, moths, termites and weevils, especially common species being the angola white lady, Macrotermes natalensis, Cyrtacanthacris aeruginosa, and the desert locust. Sometimes they might also eat small fishes by swooping down from a perch hovering over water and dipping, it has been observed small birds being captured with their claws or bills, namely the bronze mannikin. Plants take around 15% of their diet, usually eaten are the Moringa oleifera, Azadirachta indica and the Dialium guineense. This bird is solitary in its hunting. This species spends about 62% of the day feeding during the dry season, and 56% of the day during rainy seasons.

Typically, the fork-tailed drongo perches at a height ranging from 5 m (16 ft 5 in) to 7 m (22 ft 11 1/2 in), adopting an erect posture from which they swiftly pursue insects by flycatching, plunge diving, or seizing them on the ground before returning to the same branch. This species is capable of holding large items with their claws and rending them with their bills. They frequently inhabit savanna fires, where they capture fleeing insects and other prey seeking refuge from the flames. These birds maintain a commensalist relationship with large mammals, trailing animals such as elephants and giraffes that disturb insects in the vicinity, thereby flushing out potential prey.

=== Kleptoparasitism ===
A tactic employed by the fork-tailed drongo to acquire food is an opportunistic kleptoparasitism. The drongo will give genuine alarm calls to signal the presence of predators to other animals, but occasionally, it will issue a false alarm call to displace those animals and steal their food. These birds may also engage in direct attacks on other species or do so after a failed false alarm attempt.

It has been observed that fork-tailed drongos spend approximately 29% of their time trailing other animals. Species such as southern pied babblers, sociable weavers, wattled starlings and meerkats, which forage on the ground, are often targeted by fork-tailed's kleptoparasitism. This behavior arises because drongos lack the necessary morphological adaptations to effectively hunt certain prey that are more nutritious and calorific, hence resorting to kleptoparasitism. These birds frequently assume leadership roles in mixed-species foraging flocks, serving as sentinels alongside other species. This cooperative strategy reduces the risk of predation and enhances the foraging success of the associated species. Simultaneously, the drongo exploits these associations to increase opportunities for kleptoparasitism.

Although in doubt, researchers have considered the possibility that these drongos possess a theory of mind, a trait not fully demonstrated in any animal other than humans. This is attributed to the birds' adaptability in response to feedback. They may vary their tactics by occasionally emitting either genuine or deceptive alarm calls. Approximately a quarter of their food intake is estimated to result from kleptoparasitism, with an additional 10% acquired by capturing prey flushed by associated species. Furthermore, the prey caught using this strategy are typically larger than those acquired through self-foraging. After emitting a deceptive call, the drongo will follow up with an 'all clear' signal, to minimize the disruption to the foraging activities of other animals and increases the frequency of genuine alarm calls in order to gain the trust back.

A study has cast doubt on the widespread assumption that the fork-tailed drongo relies heavily on its kleptoparasitic tactics. Instead, these birds may deploy such strategies primarily in times of food scarcity, such as during droughts and on cold days. Even though the biomass intake when doing kleptoparasitism is higher, it also poses risks as a foraging tactic and may result in additional foraging costs compared to self-foraging.

=== Breeding ===
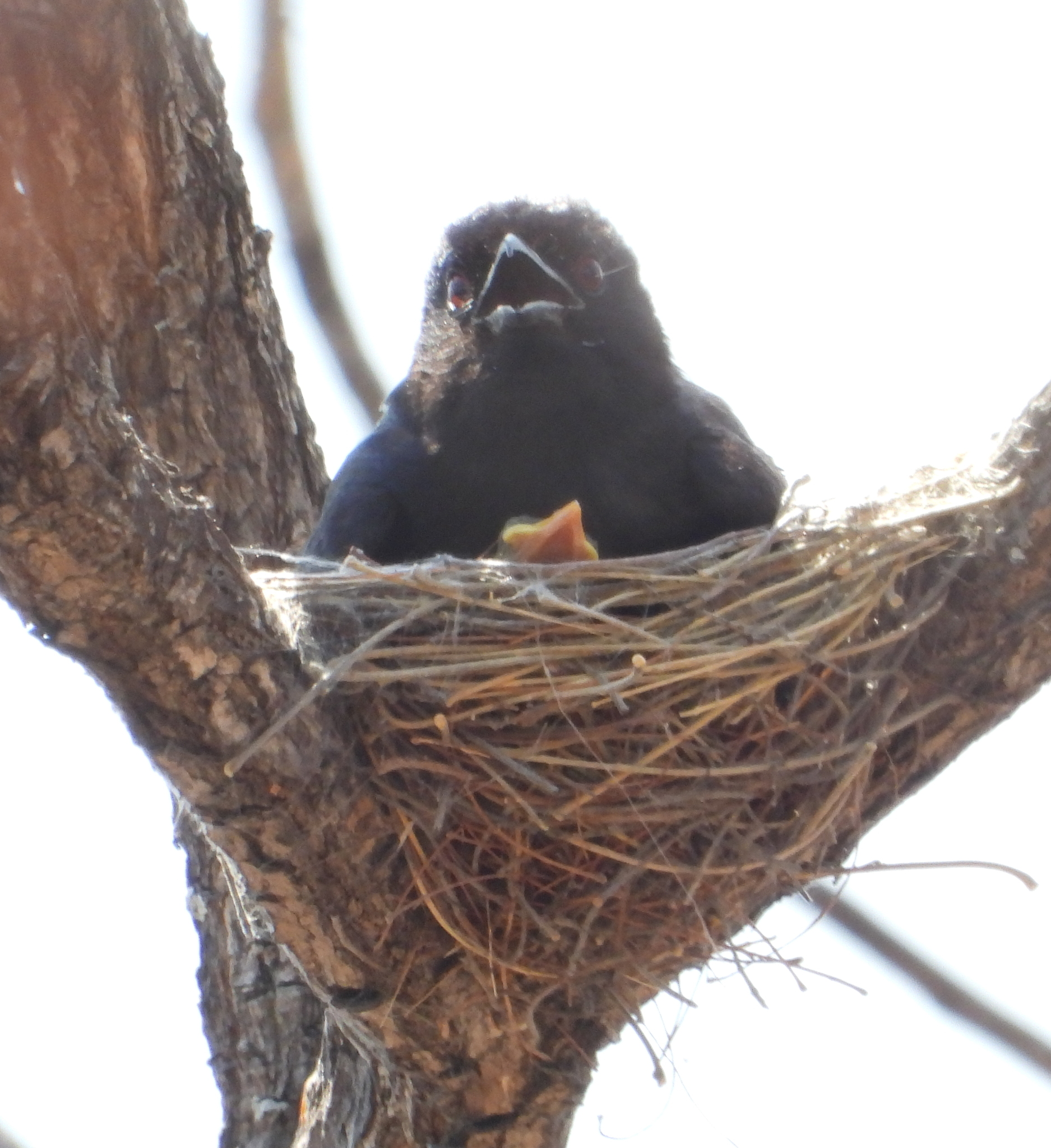
At nest with chick

During the breeding season, these birds often nest close to wetlands, forests, and farms, benefiting from the favorable nesting sites and materials provided by the microhabitat and vegetation. They exhibit monogamous behavior and are known for their aggressiveness towards other drongos, as well as nest predators like crows, birds of prey, hornbills, shrikes, small mammals, and large snakes. Partners perch together, performing duets, and displaying behaviors such as tilting and nodding their heads. Brood parasitism on groundscraper thrush have been observed.

The breeding season typically extends from March to September north of the equator and from September to January south of it. The timing of the egg-laying season varies significantly between regions. The number of broods ranges from one to four, and if a clutch is lost early in the season, they may replace it. Nests are usually positioned 2.2 to 17 meters above the ground, constructed between horizontal branches, and feature saucer-shaped structures crafted from plant stems, lichens, small roots, tendrils, and cobwebs. Eggs are laid at intervals of 24 to 48 hours. Incubation, lasting 15 to 18 days, begins only after the clutch is complete. Both male and female birds feed the chicks, providing flies, beetle larvae, lizards, and seeds. The nestling period typically spans from 16 to 22 days.

Drongos are frequently utilized as brood hosts by African cuckoos (21.8% of nests), and in the Kalahari Desert, it has been discovered that Jacobin cuckoos also parasitize drongo nests. Drongo eggs display a diverse array of colors and patterns, which the cuckoos mimic. Experiments indicate that drongos can detect and reject 93.7% of introduced eggs.

== Conservation status ==
Due to their very large range, stable population trend and size, the fork-tailed drongo is considered to be a least-concern species by the IUCN Red List, though the subspecies D. a. modestus, previously considered a separated species, was considered a near-threatened. The fork-tailed drongo faces threats from pesticide use, which diminishes their prey availability, and habitat destruction due to farmland expansion. However, the species is unlikely to be threatened in the near future as it benefits from tree clearance in dense forests.

== Gallery ==
D. a. apivorus, Tswalu Kalahari Reserve

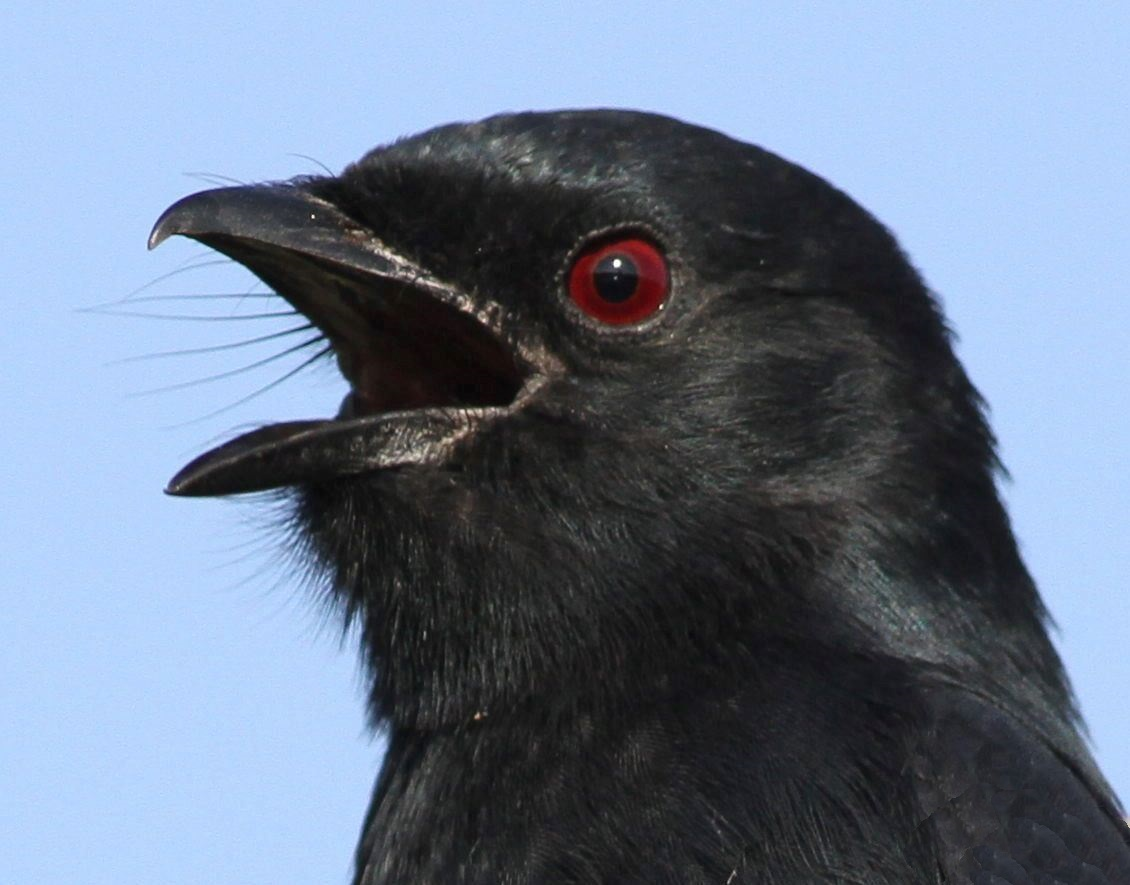
View of pronounced rictal and nasal bristles and the deep red eye

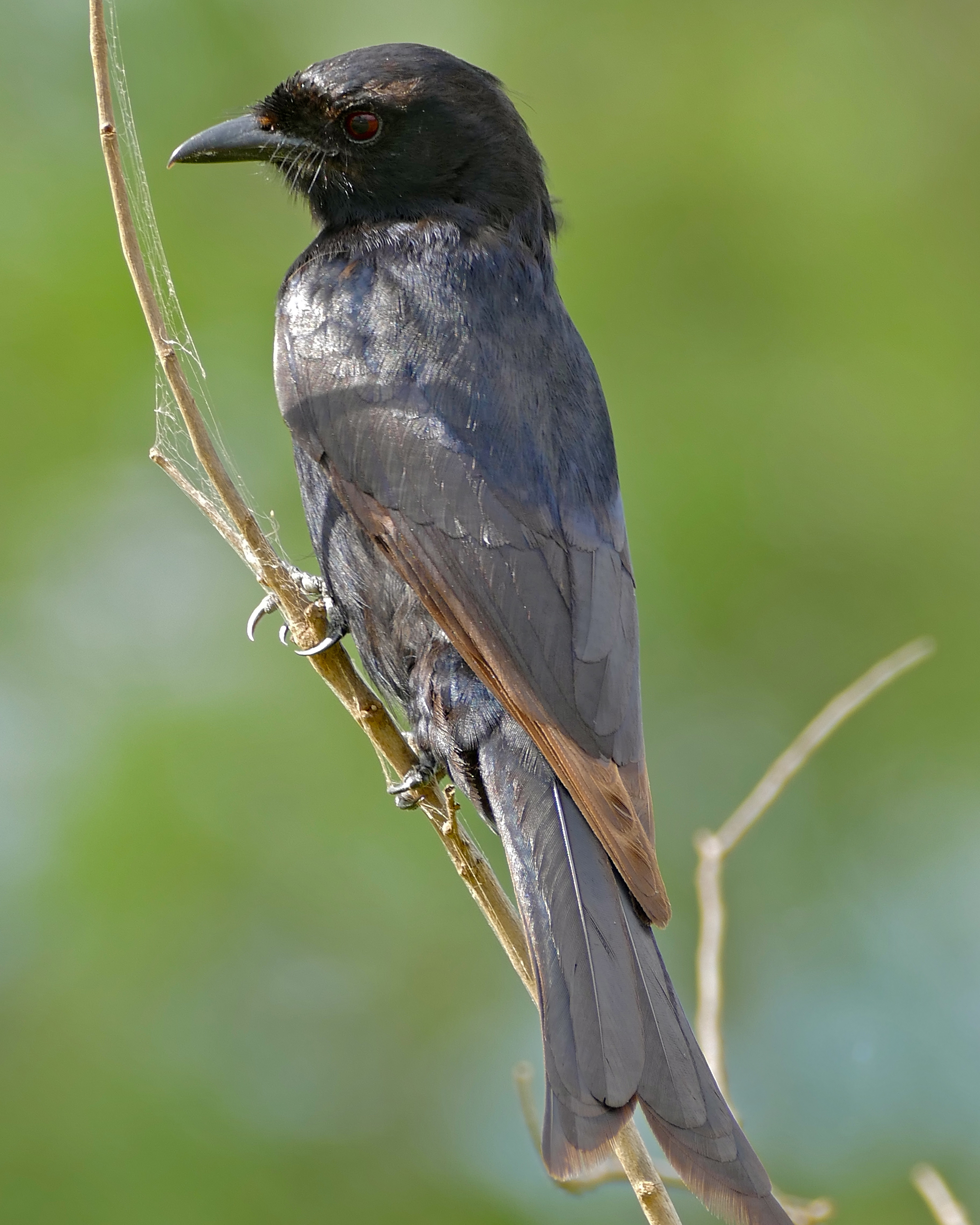
Eastern race D. a. fugax is somewhat smaller than the nominate.

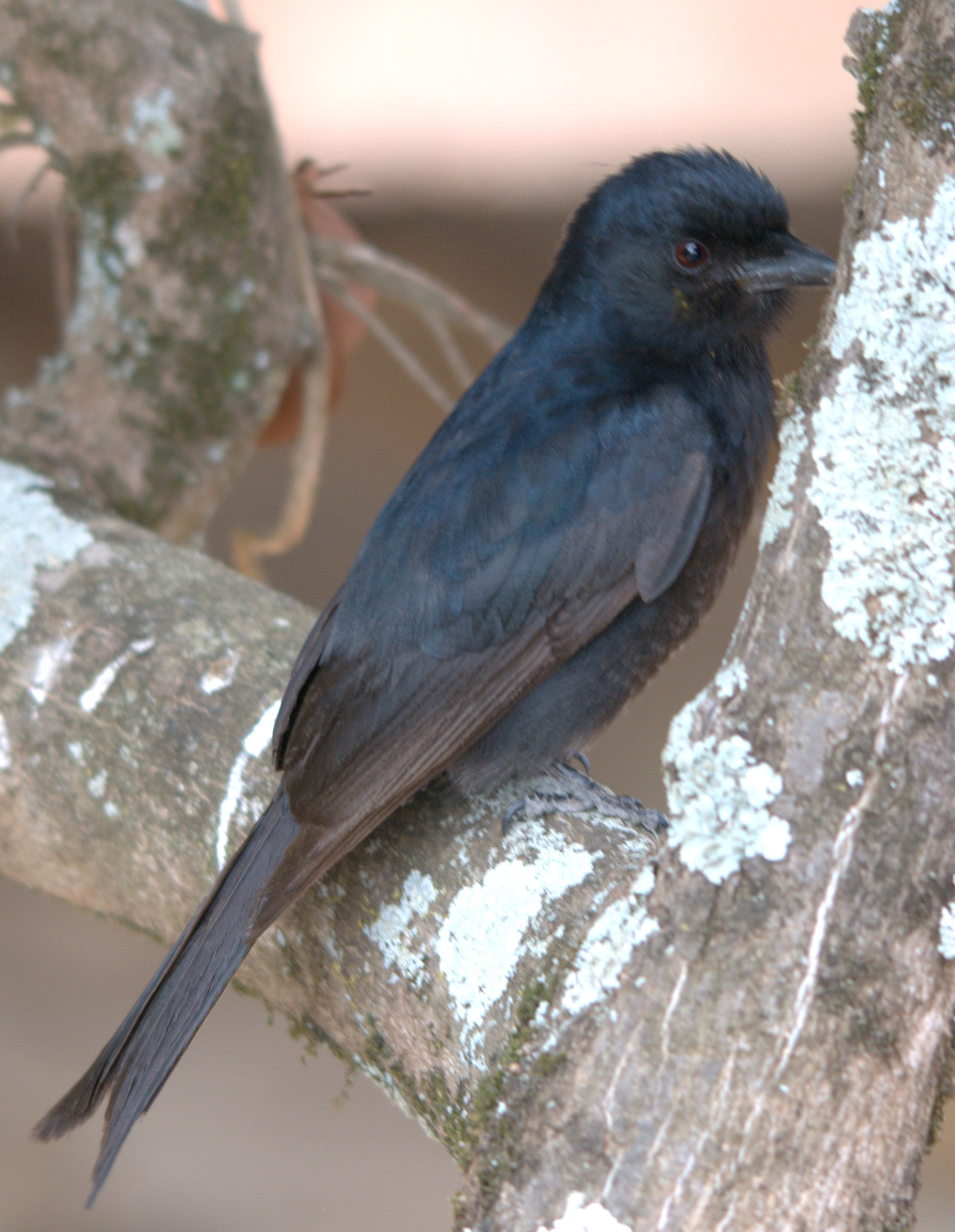
Immature D. a. adsimilis with dusky primaries
