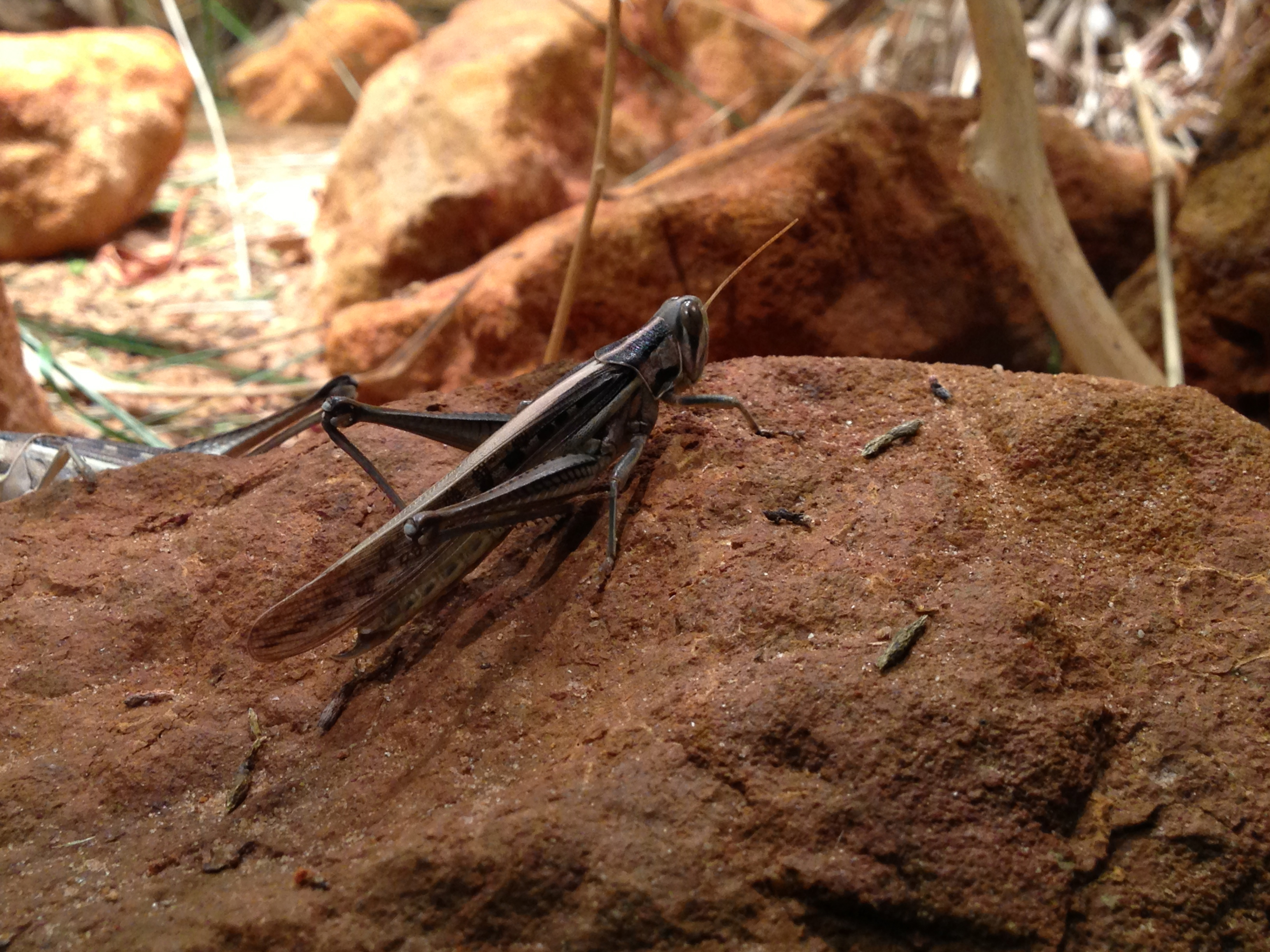
- Austracris guttulosa

Scientific classification
- Domain: Eukaryota
- Kingdom: Animalia
- Phylum: Arthropoda
- Class: Insecta
- Order: Orthoptera
- Suborder: Caelifera
- Family: Acrididae
- Subfamily: Cyrtacanthacridinae
- Genus: Austracris; Uvarov 1923

= Austracris =

Genus of grasshoppers

Austracris is a genus of Orthoptera: Caeliferan insect in the family Acrididae: subfamily Cyrtacanthacridinae. It includes an Australian pest, the spur-throated locust.

== Species ==
The Orthoptera Species File and Catalogue of Life lists:

- Austracris basalis (Walker, 1870)
- Austracris eximia (Sjöstedt, 1931)
- Austracris guttulosa (Walker, 1870) - type species (as Cyrtacanthacris guttulosa Walker, F)
- Austracris proxima (Walker, 1870)

== Gallery ==
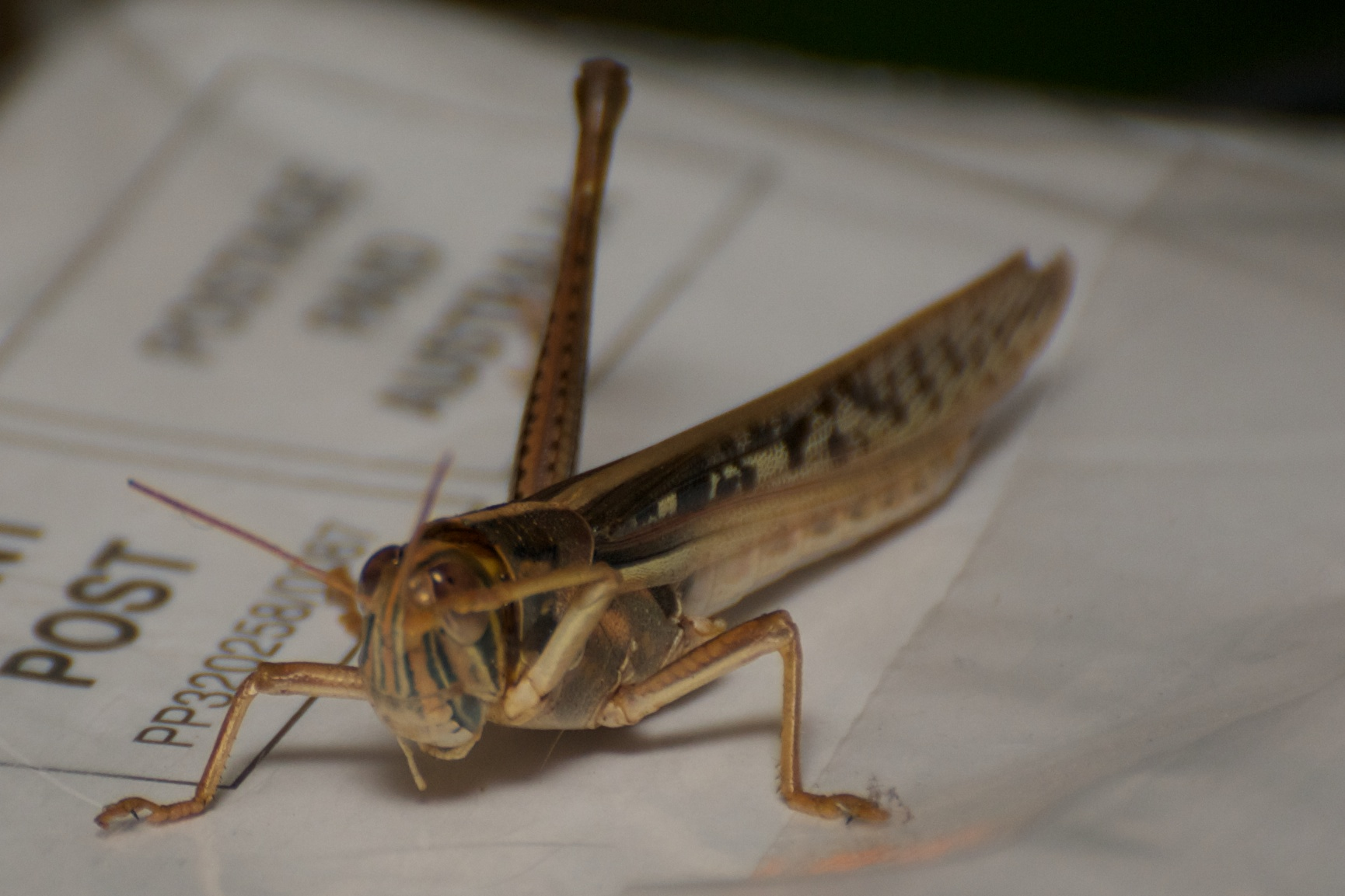

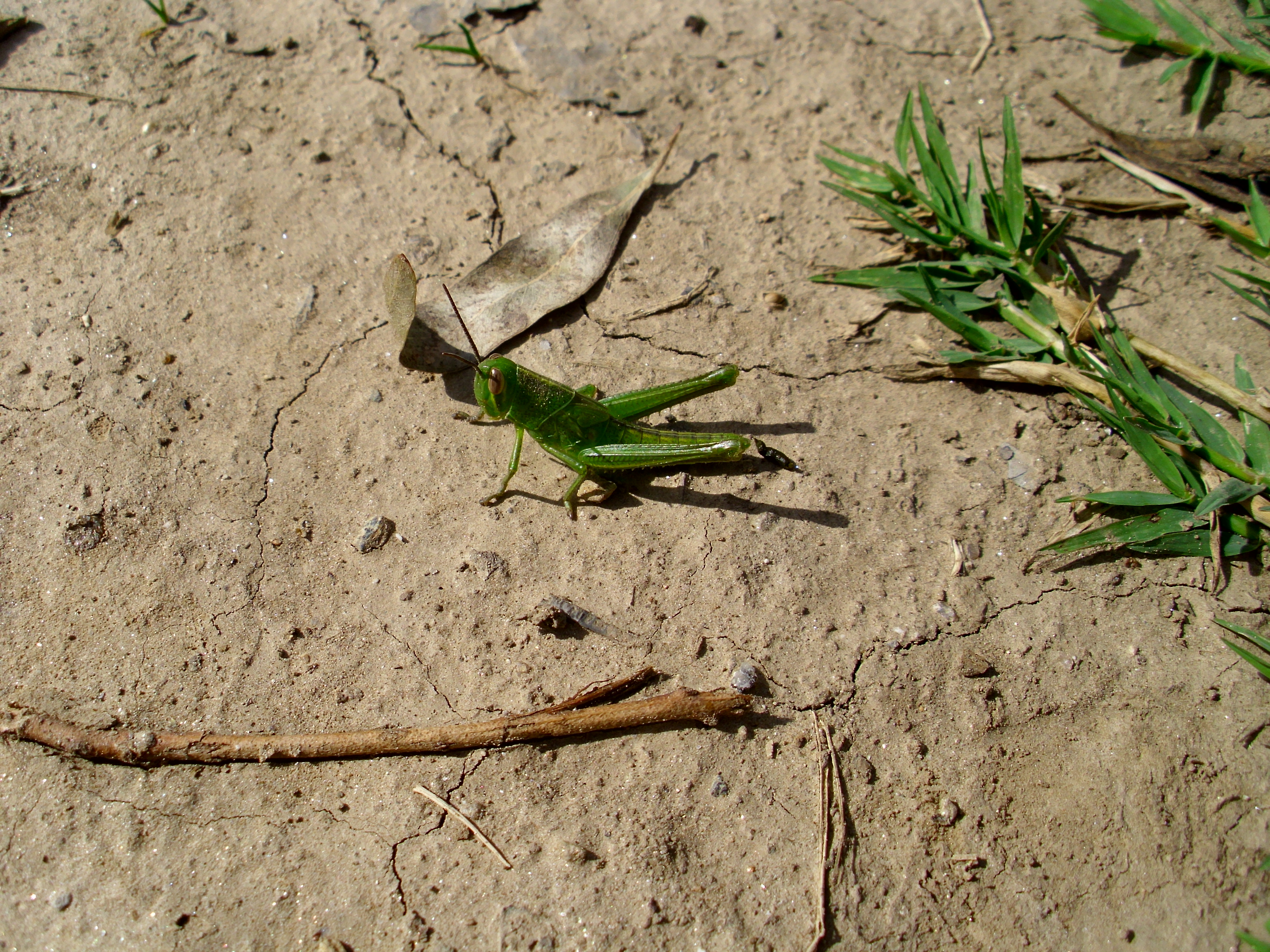
