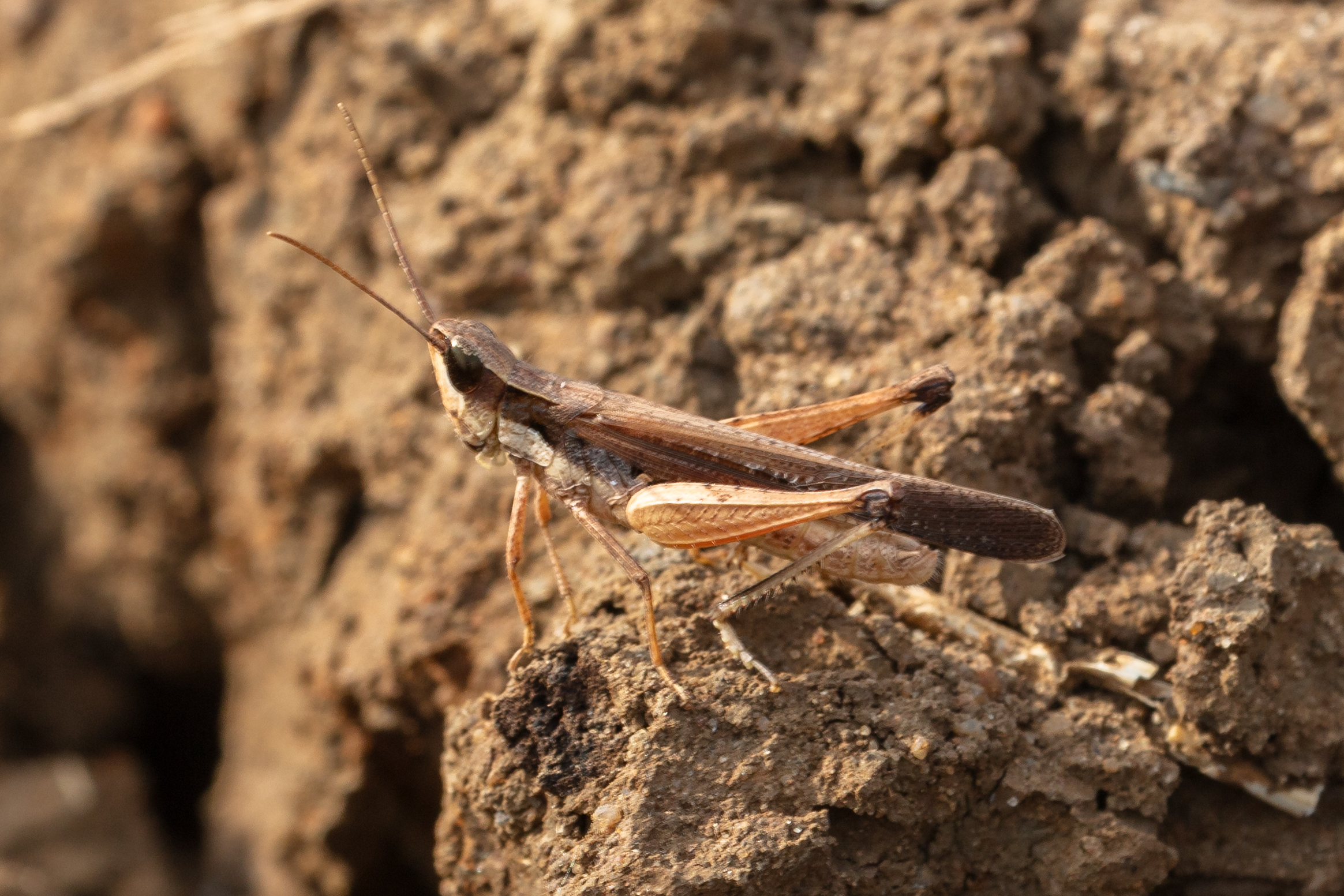
- Gymnobothrus flexuosus

Scientific classification
- Domain: Eukaryota
- Kingdom: Animalia
- Phylum: Arthropoda
- Class: Insecta
- Order: Orthoptera
- Suborder: Caelifera
- Family: Acrididae
- Subfamily: Acridinae
- Tribe: Gymnobothrini
- Genus: Gymnobothrus; Bolívar, 1889

Synonyms
- Gymnobothroides Karny, 1917; Ogmothela Karsch, 1896; Orthochirista Sjöstedt, 1933; Phloeochopardia Dirsh, 1958; Pseudochirista Bolívar, 1909; Ugandella Sjöstedt, 1923

= Gymnobothrus =

Genus of grasshoppers

Gymnobothrus is the type genus of grasshoppers in the tribe Gymnobothrini Uvarov, 1953; species can be found in Africa. Besides the synonyms listed here, several species were considered similar-to and previously placed in, the genus Chortoicetes.

== Species ==
The Orthoptera Species File lists:

1. Gymnobothrus anchietae Bolívar, 1890
2. Gymnobothrus carinatus Uvarov, 1942
3. Gymnobothrus cruciatus Bolívar, 1890
4. Gymnobothrus flexuosus (Schulthess, 1898)
5. Gymnobothrus gracilis (Ramme, 1931)
6. Gymnobothrus levipes (Karsch, 1896)
7. Gymnobothrus lineaalba Bolívar, 1890 - type species (as G. linea alba Bolívar)
8. Gymnobothrus longicornis (Ramme, 1931)
9. Gymnobothrus madacassus Bruner, 1911
10. Gymnobothrus oberthuri Bolívar, 1891
11. Gymnobothrus pullus (Karny, 1917)
12. Gymnobothrus rimulatus (Karsch, 1896)
13. Gymnobothrus roemeri (Karny, 1909)
14. Gymnobothrus scapularis Bolívar, 1890
15. Gymnobothrus temporalis (Stål, 1876)
16. Gymnobothrus variabilis Bruner, 1911
