= Spencer Smith-White =

Australian botanist (1909–1998)

Spencer Smith-White (14 April 1909 – 26 March 1998) was an Australian botanist, winner of the Clarke Medal in 1967.

Smith-White was born in Sydney and studied at the University of Sydney, obtaining B.Sc.Agr. in 1932 and D.Sc.Agr. in 1956. In 1934, Smith-White was science master at Scotch College, Adelaide; from 1935 to 1936 he was a plant breeder with the New South Wales Department of Agriculture, then for eleven years from 1937 he was research officer and botanist with the Museum of Applied Science, Sydney. In 1948 Smith-White started as a lecturer with the University of Sydney, then became senior lecturer and then reader in Botany until 1963. From 1963 to 1974 he was Professor of Biology (genetics).

In 1967, Smith-White was awarded the Clarke Medal of the Royal Society of New South Wales.

Awards
Preceded by Dorothy Hill	Clarke Medal; 1967	Succeeded by Herbert Andrewartha
