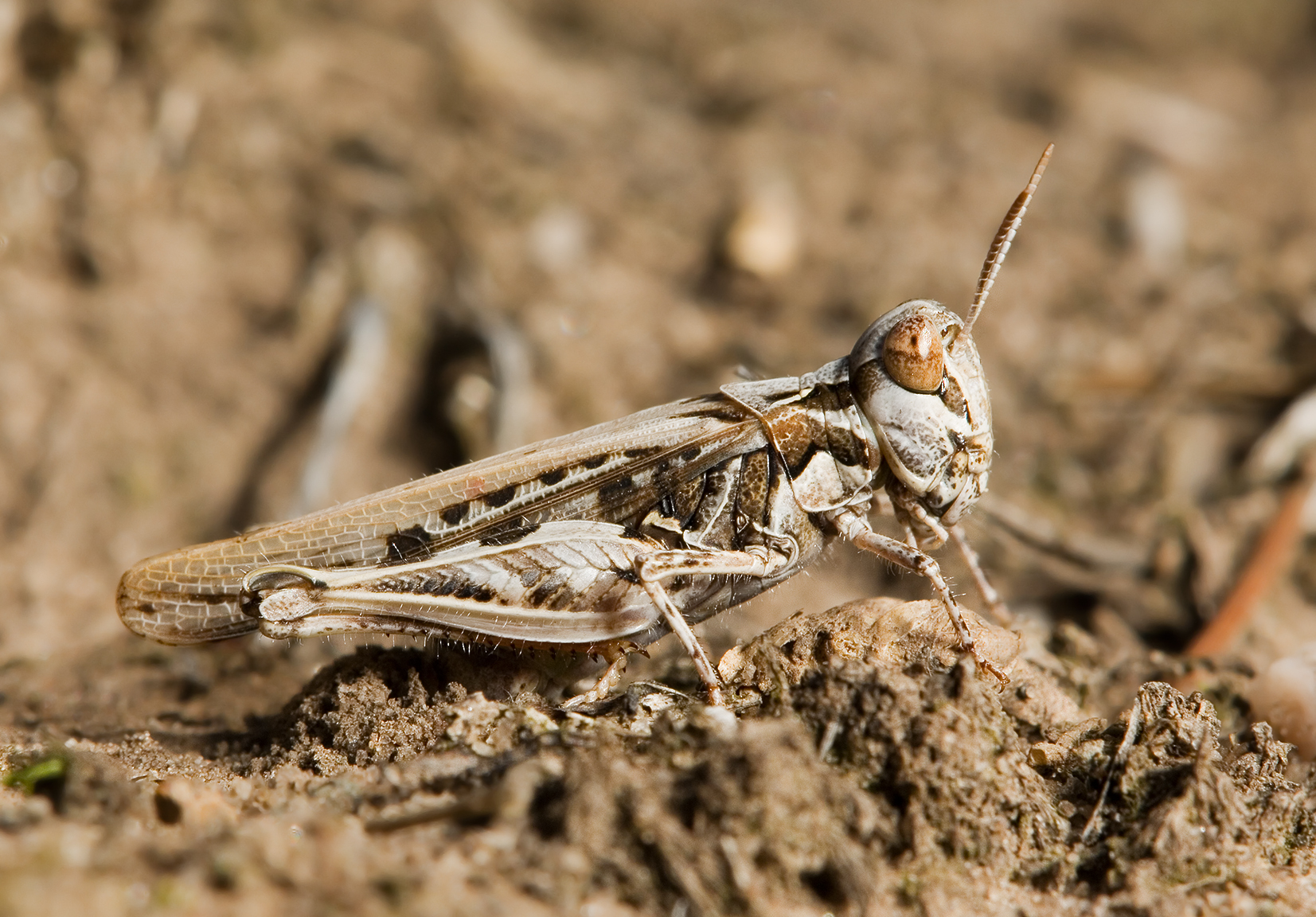

Scientific classification
- Kingdom: Animalia
- Phylum: Arthropoda
- Clade: Pancrustacea
- Class: Insecta
- Order: Orthoptera
- Suborder: Caelifera
- Family: Acrididae
- Genus: Austroicetes
- Species: A. frater

Binomial name
- Austroicetes frater (Brančik, 1897)

Synonyms
- Chortoicetes freter Brančik, 1897; Chortoicetes montana Sjöstedt, 1934; Chortoicetes tonnoiri Sjöstedt, 1936; Chortoicetes vittata Sjöstedt, 1936; Chortoicetes finitima Sjöstedt,1936; Chortoicetes concolor Sjöstedt,1936

= Austroicetes frater =

Species of grasshopper

Austroicetes frater, commonly known as the southern austroicetes, is an Australian grasshopper in the subfamily Oedipodinae or Acridinae. It is found in regions of South Australia, New South Wales, Victoria, and Tasmania.

== Description ==
The southern austroicetes has a slim, tan body and burnt umber eyes. It has wings, but mainly jumps with its back legs. A shield, called pronotum, is located at the front segment of the thorax. The last section of the leg has four segments and the antennae has more than seven segments. The joint between leg and foot (tarsi) has 11 segments, with spiracles on the first eight. A. frater is abundant from mid August to early December. Their diet consists of a diversity of food, although they prefer green plants. There has been continuous usage of ULV insecticides and bran baits on the grasshopper.

== Life cycle ==
Adults lay eggs in the ground around June or July. The eggs begin to mature, then go to sleep until they are awoken by the cool weather of winter. The eggs rapidly mature as temperature increases in spring, and hatch the following August when abundant food is available. Nymphs shed many times, and become adults who lay eggs between October and November. One generation is produced annually. Austroicetes frater exhibits considerable variation in population density with regard to its seasonal reproducing cycle, which is frequently impacted by weather and food availability. The numbers may expand quickly during times of elevated vegetation growth, which could have an effect on nearby plant communities and cause changes in the ecosystem.

== Etymology ==
The prefix austro- in Austroicetes is used in compound words, meaning "south". It was derived from the Latin word austerus. The word frater, is the Latin word meaning "brother".

== See also ==
- Austroicetes vulgaris
