= Australian Plague Locust Commission =

Australian government agency

The Australian Plague Locust Commission (APLC) is a joint venture of the Australian Government and the member states of New South Wales, Victoria, South Australia and Queensland, created in 1974 to manage outbreaks of the Australian plague locust, the spur-throated locust and the migratory locust in eastern Australia. With 19 staff members at its headquarters in Canberra and field offices in Narromine, Broken Hill and Longreach, it is jointly funded by the Commonwealth government and by the Australian states of New South Wales, Victoria, South Australia and Queensland.

== Activities ==
The APLC conducts regular surveys of locust populations and migrations and carries out control of locust outbreaks by means of aerial application of pesticides; traditionally these were chemicals, but more recently APLC has been a major contributor to the development of a biological pesticide in collaboration with CSIRO and LUBILOSA scientists. It also conducts educational outreach and training courses for landowners, businesses, and local governments, including international consulting work in Asia, Africa and South America.

Responsibility to control limited outbreaks of the pest species resides with the states. The APLC undertakes and coordinates activities when species migrate or have the potential to migrate across state borders and subsequently cause damage to agriculture in more than one of the member states. The establishment of the APLC allowed for the first use of remotely sensed data to forecast locust populations in Australia.

In 2010, the APLC together with the states identified the potential for a significant infestation of the Australian plague locust. A coordinated effort to minimise damage was undertaken. The activities were estimated to have saved $963 million from an expenditure of $50 million.

== See also ==
- Agriculture in Australia
