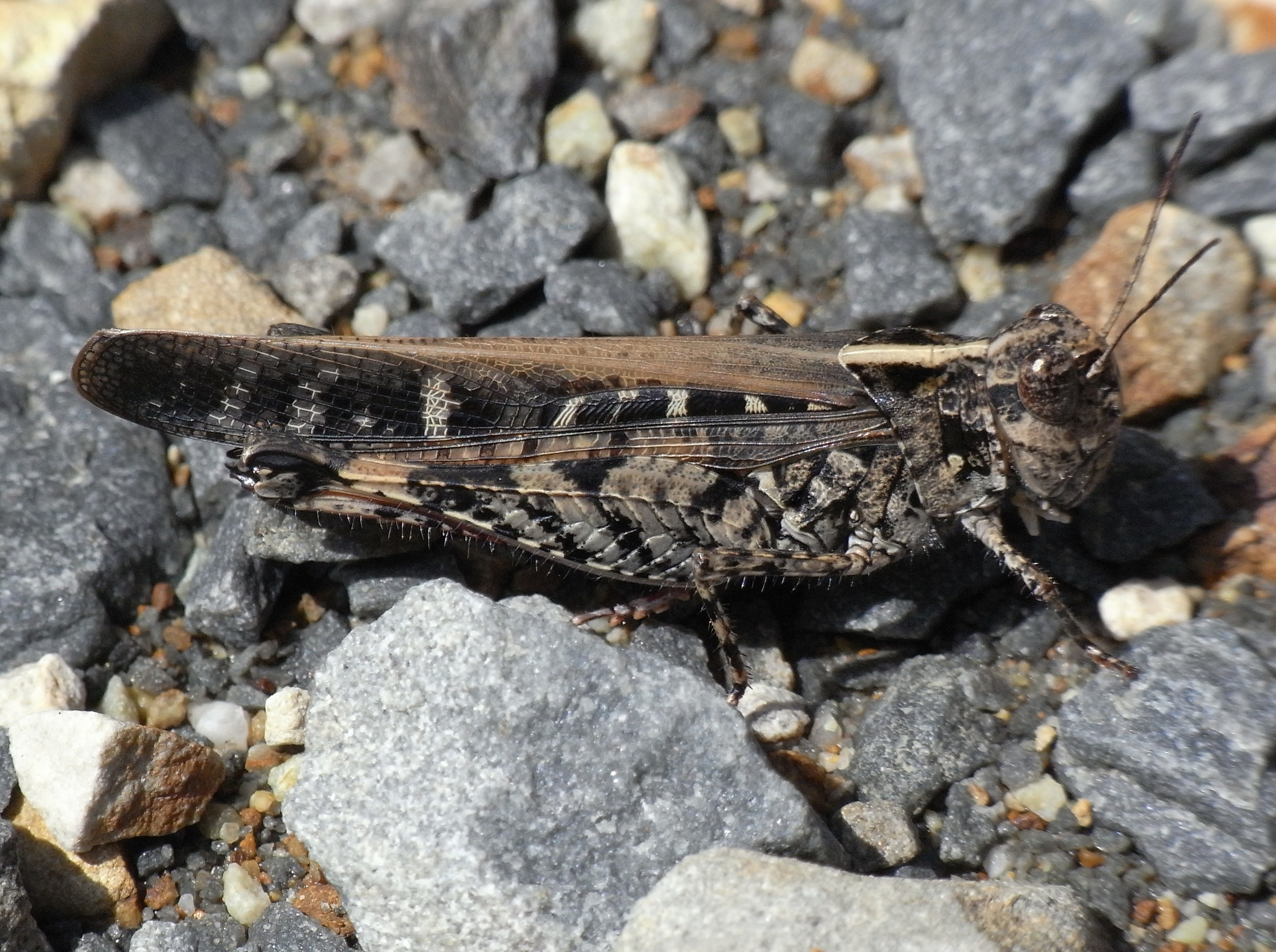
- Heteropternis obscurella, Long-legged Bandwing, Australia

Scientific classification
- Kingdom: Animalia
- Phylum: Arthropoda
- Clade: Pancrustacea
- Class: Insecta
- Order: Orthoptera
- Suborder: Caelifera
- Family: Acrididae
- Subfamily: Oedipodinae
- Tribe: Epacromiini
- Genus: Heteropternis
- Species: H. obscurella

Binomial name
- Heteropternis obscurella (Blanchard, 1853)

= Heteropternis obscurella =

Species of grasshopper

Heteropternis obscurella, the long-legged bandwing, is a species of band-winged grasshopper in the family Acrididae. It is found in southeast Asia and Oceania.
