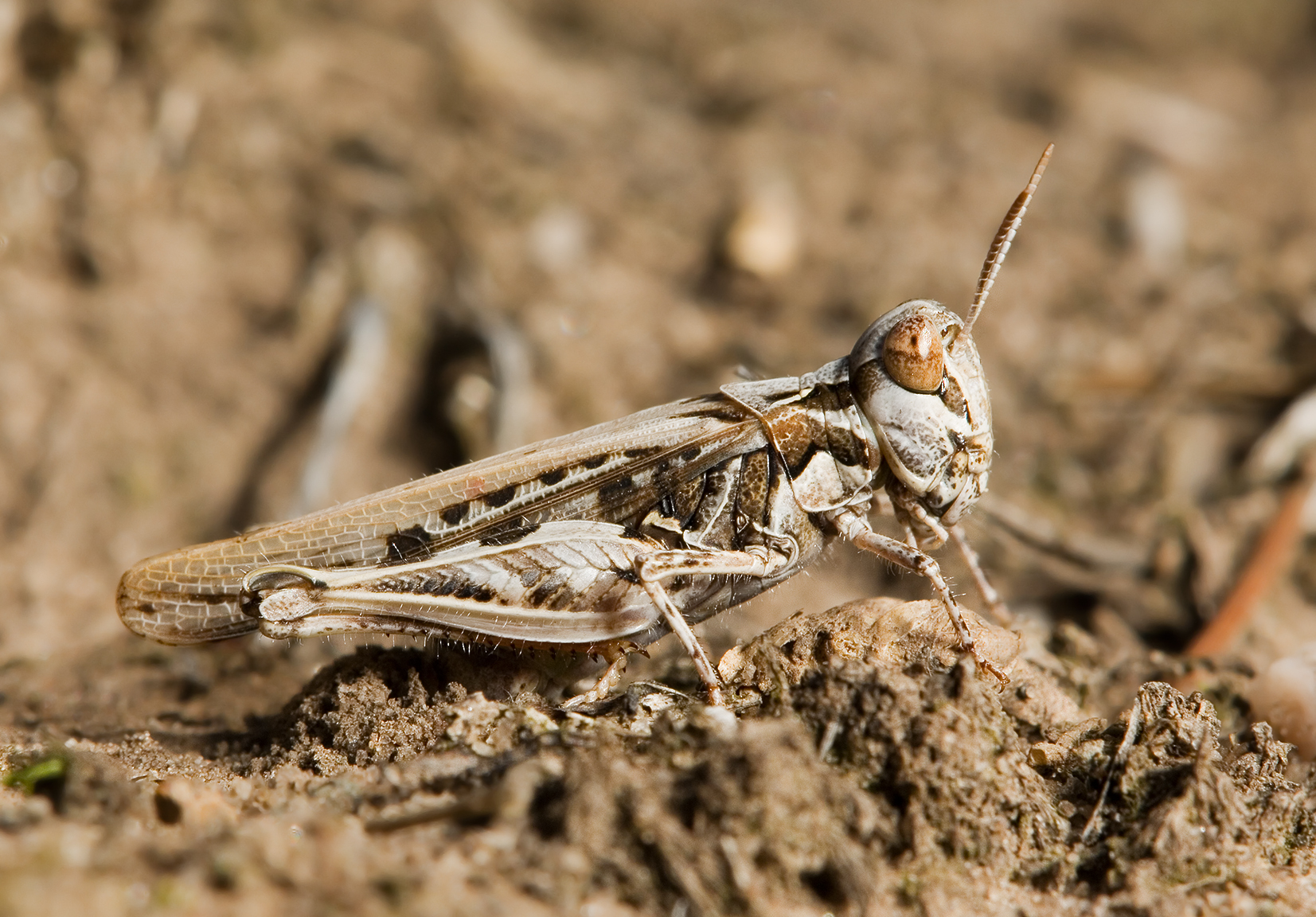
- Southern Austroicetes (A. frater)

Scientific classification
- Kingdom: Animalia
- Phylum: Arthropoda
- Clade: Pancrustacea
- Class: Insecta
- Order: Orthoptera
- Suborder: Caelifera
- Family: Acrididae
- Subfamily: Oedipodinae
- Genus: Austroicetes; Uvarov, 1925

= Austroicetes =

Genus of grasshoppers

Austroicetes is a genus of grasshoppers in the subfamily Oedipodinae (incertae sedis) and family Acrididae. Members of the genus typically feed on grass and herbs.

== Species ==
Several species were placed previously in the genus Chortoicetes. The Orthoptera Species File presently (2021) lists:

1. Austroicetes arida Key, 1954
2. Austroicetes cruciata (Saussure, 1888)
3. Austroicetes frater (Brancsik, 1897)
4. Austroicetes interioris White & Key, 1957
5. Austroicetes nullarborensis Key, 1954
6. Austroicetes pusilla (Walker, 1870) - type species (as Epacromia pusilla Walker)
7. Austroicetes tenuicornis Key, 1954
8. Austroicetes tricolor (Sjöstedt, 1920)
9. Austroicetes vulgaris (Sjöstedt, 1932)
