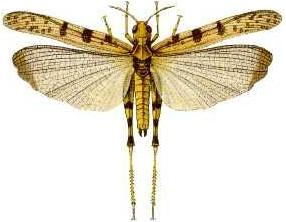

Scientific classification
- Kingdom: Animalia
- Phylum: Arthropoda
- Clade: Pancrustacea
- Class: Insecta
- Order: Orthoptera
- Suborder: Caelifera
- Family: Acrididae
- Genus: Chortoicetes
- Species: C. terminifera

Binomial name
- Chortoicetes terminifera (Walker, 1870)

Synonyms
- Calataria coerulescens Sjöstedt, 1932; Calataria rubripes Sjöstedt, 1921; Calataria terminifera subsp. elegans Sjöstedt, 1921; Calataria terminifera subsp. fuscosanguinea Sjöstedt, 1936; Chortoicetes affinis J.A.G.Rehn, 1907; Chortoicetes yorketownensis Brancsik, 1896; Chortoicetes yorketownensis subsp. fuscus Brancsik, 1896; Epacromia terminifera F.Walker, 1870

= Australian plague locust =

Species of grasshopper

The Australian plague locust (Chortoicetes terminifera) is a species of locust in the family Acrididae native to Australia, where it is a significant agricultural pest.

== Description ==
Adult Australian plague locusts range in size from 20 to 45 mm (0.79 to 1.77 in) in length, and the colour varies from brown to green. In profile, the head is higher than the thorax, and the thorax has an X-shaped mark. The legs have a reddish shank and the wings are clear other than for a dark spot on the periphery.

== Range and habitat ==
The locusts occur naturally in far northwestern New South Wales and the adjoining areas of Queensland and South Australia, as well as Western Australia. From these areas, the locusts can expand from time to time to be found in the agricultural areas of South Australia, New South Wales, including the Riverina, and Victoria. The locust can be found in a variety of grassland and open wooded habitats across the inland areas of the Australian mainland. Upper-level winds may occasionally carry locusts to coastal areas of the mainland and northern Tasmania and may establish populations in the eastern valleys of the Great Dividing Range; these populations usually fail to establish themselves for more than a few generations. Climatic change is projected to influence spatial patterns of pest outbreaks, as climate change is a primary limiting factor for insect dispersal. The most commercially important locust species in Australia is the Australian plague locust, Chortoicetes terminifera. Invasions wreak havoc on agricultural crops and pastures on a massive scale.

== Life-cycle ==
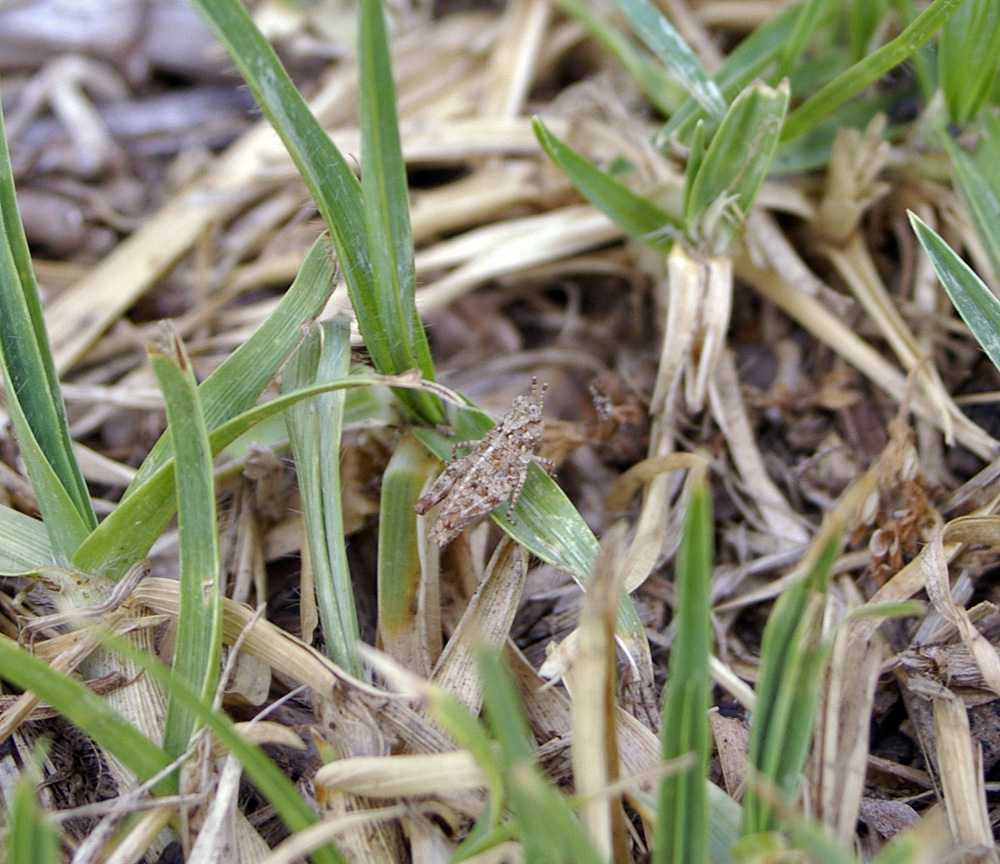
A first-instar nymph of C. terminifera

Adult locusts feeding on green shoots that follow rain within 24 to 48 hours in warmer months will mature and lay eggs within 5 to 7 days of a rain event. Using their ovipositors to drill a hole, locusts lay their eggs in the soil in a pod. Pods contain around 30 to 50 eggs and locusts lay two or three pods, 5 to 10 days apart. Egglaying often happens en masse, with as many as a million laid in a hectare of suitable soil. In good conditions (i.e. warm and moist), eggs take around two weeks to develop.

After hatching, the nymphs take around 20–25 days to complete development in mid-summer. The locust has five instars, with the wings becoming more prominent with each moult. After the first and second instars, nymphs form aggregations known as bands; these tend to disperse by the fifth instar. Late-instar bands travel up to 500 m per day. Drier country has large bands congregating that are visible from the air, while in the agricultural regions, bands tend to be smaller.

After its final moult—6 to 8 weeks after egglaying—the adult locust is called a fledgling. Fledglings have three development stages; a growth phase, where wings are strengthened and the exoskeleton hardened, a fat accumulation stage, and lastly, oocyte development. Gregarious populations of locusts form swarms, recurring in central Eastern Australia once every two or three years. The Australian plague locust is less gregarious than other locust species and swarms occur in a continuum from dense swarms through a range of densities down to scattered adults. Swarms may persist for days, dispersing and reforming while following the wind. Swarms may move up to 20 km in a day. Swarms can infest areas up to 50 km^{2} (19 sq mi), although typical infestations are less than 5 km^{2} (1.9 sq mi). Swarms can travel up to 800 km (500 mi), tending to move with hot winds and generally towards the coast in most cases.

== Plagues ==
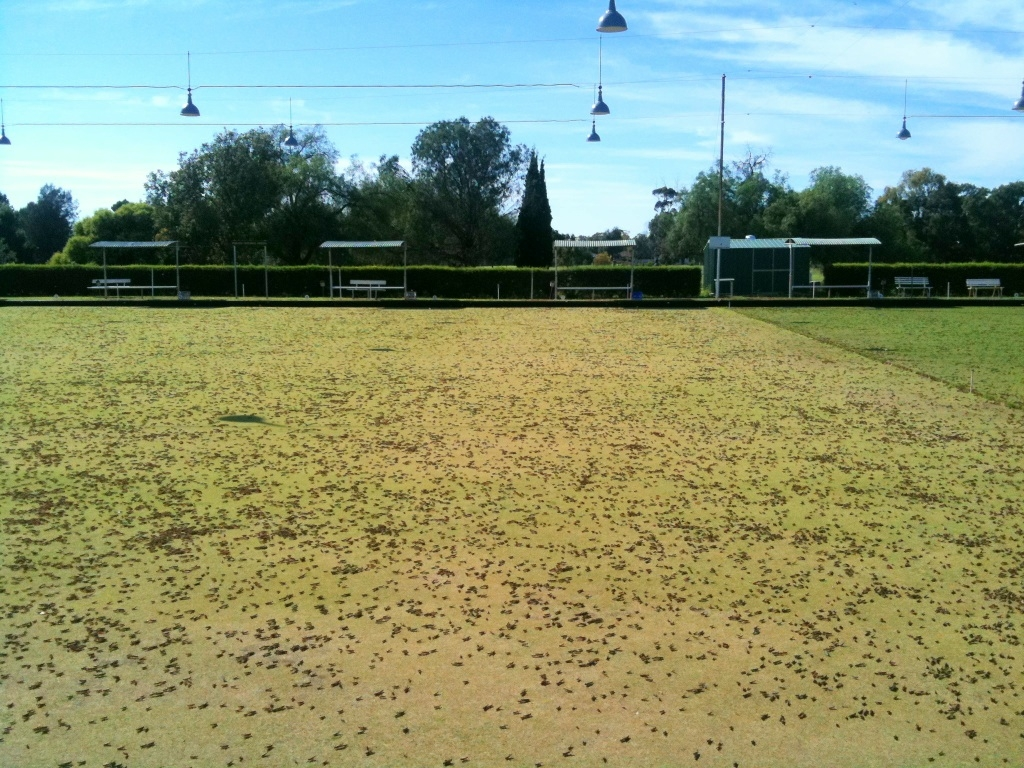
A small, high-density swarm of C. terminifera resting on a bowling green at Berrigan, New South Wales in December 2010

When food and climatic conditions are favourable, huge swarms of locusts may develop. The first recorded swarm was in 1844, with further outbreaks from the 1870s onward. After 1900, the intensity and frequency of locust swarms increased, and since the 1920s, a pattern has developed of localised, high-density populations in some locations most years and less frequent major plagues over large areas persisting for one to two years.

Infestations in Western Australia are less frequent. Widespread heavy inland rains, especially in summer, allow plague locusts to reach plague proportions with less regular rain maintaining these high-density populations. During these conditions, the lifecycle pattern may change to one in which the period from hatching to maturity is reduced to 2.5 months. Dry conditions reduce populations to background levels.

Due to its large range and frequent plagues, the Australian plague locust is the most damaging locust species in Australia. Damage is mainly confined to pasture, although crop damage can occur. Advanced winter crops have generally hardened off by early summer, when plague locusts become active and therefore are not favoured, but dry conditions and less advanced crops can be highly susceptible to locust infestation as can young autumn crops.

Medium-density swarm of C. terminifera in Wagga Wagga, New South Wales in December 2010

== Human control ==
Losses in a plague can amount to $3–4 million if protection barriers are ineffective. The Australian Plague Locust Commission is responsible for the monitoring and control of locust outbreaks using the control agent fipronil and growth regulators such as diflubenzuron in the juvenile nymphal stage. Two older-generation organophosphates, fenitrothion and chlorpyrifos, are also used occasionally for auxiliary, blanket spray runs, and the bioinsecticide 'Green Guard', made from a native fungal isolate of Metarhizium acridum. The latter is based on technology developed by CSIRO and the LUBILOSA programme, and now accounts for more than 12% of spray applications: for protected, organic farming, or environmentally susceptible areas such as water courses.

== See also ==
- Agriculture in Australia
- APLC
- Spur-throated locust, Austracris guttalosa – another plague locust in Australia
- Yellow-winged locust, Gastrimargus musicus – a similar grasshopper
