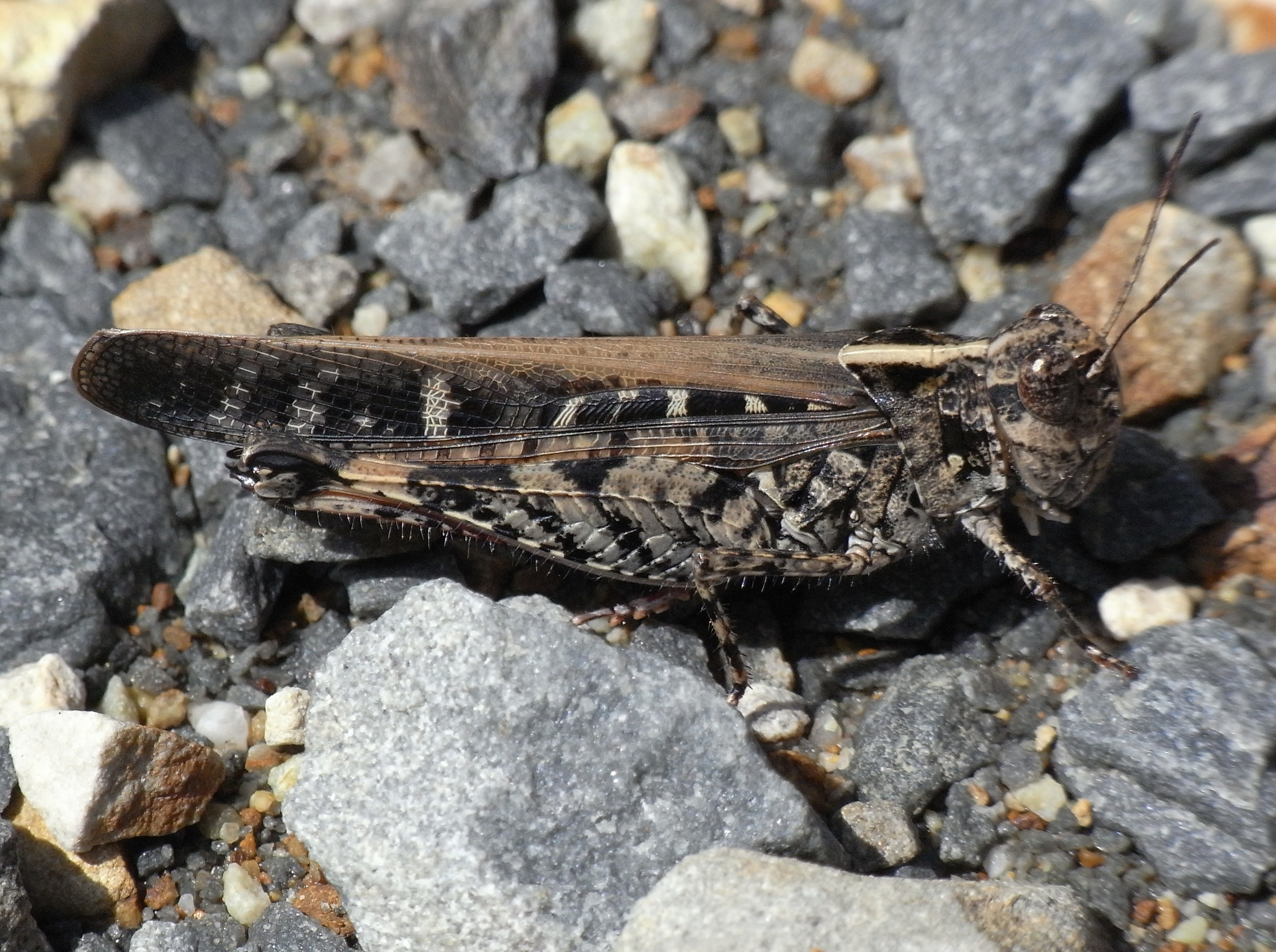
- Heteropternis obscurella

Scientific classification
- Domain: Eukaryota
- Kingdom: Animalia
- Phylum: Arthropoda
- Class: Insecta
- Order: Orthoptera
- Suborder: Caelifera
- Family: Acrididae
- Subfamily: Oedipodinae
- Tribe: Epacromiini
- Genus: Heteropternis; Stål, 1873

= Heteropternis =

Genus of grasshoppers

Heteropternis is a genus of grasshoppers in the family Acrididae, subfamily Oedipodinae, and tribe Epacromiini. The recorded distribution of species in Heteropternis is from Africa and India through to Japan, Malesia, and Papua New Guinea.

== Species ==
The Catalogue of Life lists:

- Heteropternis cheesmanae Uvarov, 1935
- Heteropternis coerulea Schulthess Schindler, 1899
- Heteropternis couloniana Saussure, 1884
- Heteropternis descampsi Roy, 1969
- Heteropternis guineensis Blanchard, 1853
- Heteropternis guttifera Kirby, 1902
- Heteropternis latisterna Wang & Xia, 1992
- Heteropternis micronus Huang, 1981
- Heteropternis minuta Uvarov, 1934
- Heteropternis motuoensis Yin, 1984
- Heteropternis obscurella Blanchard, 1853
- Heteropternis pudica Serville, 1838
- Heteropternis pugnax Bolívar, 1912
- Heteropternis qinghaiensis Wang & Zheng, 1992
- Heteropternis respondens Walker, 1859
- Heteropternis robusta Bey-Bienko, 1951
- Heteropternis royi Mestre, 1988
- Heteropternis rufipes Shiraki, 1910
- Heteropternis sarimahii Mahmood, Samira, Salmah & Idris, 2008
- Heteropternis thoracica Walker, 1870
