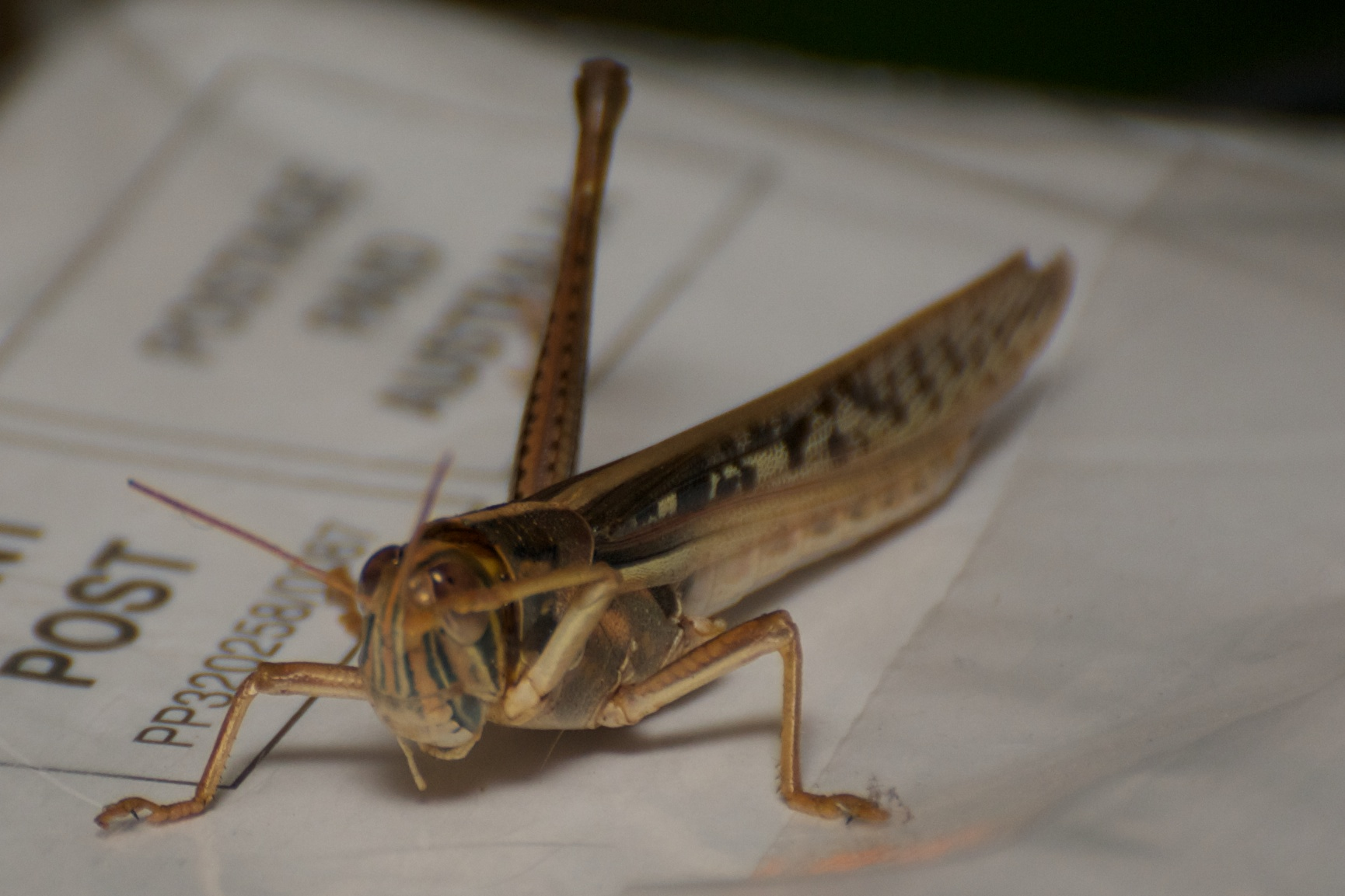

Scientific classification
- Kingdom: Animalia
- Phylum: Arthropoda
- Clade: Pancrustacea
- Class: Insecta
- Order: Orthoptera
- Suborder: Caelifera
- Superfamily: Acridoidea
- Family: Acrididae
- Subfamily: Cyrtacanthacridinae
- Genus: Austracris
- Species: A. guttulosa

Binomial name
- Austracris guttulosa (Walker, 1870)

= Spur-throated locust =

Species of insect

The spur-throated locust (Austracris guttulosa) is a native Australian locust species in the family Acrididae.

It is an agricultural pest in Queensland, New South Wales, Victoria South Australia and Western Australia. The most significant recent outbreak was in central western Queensland in 2010. In north Australian savannas it remains a solitary species.

== Description ==
Adult females of A. guttulosa are typically 45–65 millimetres (1.8–2.6 in) long, and adult males are typically 35–45 mm (1.4–1.8 in) long. Adults are pale brown with colourless wings and white and dark markings on the thorax. The hind legs are yellow with two rows of white spines. Juvenile spur-throated locusts are green or yellow. The backs of older juveniles may also show a dark or pale stripe.

The spur-throated locust has a life span on between ten and 12 months, from autumn to summer. Overpopulation of spur-throated locusts is managed in Australia by the Australian Plague Locust Commission.

== See also ==
- Australian plague locust, Chortoicetes terminifera – another plague locust in Australia
