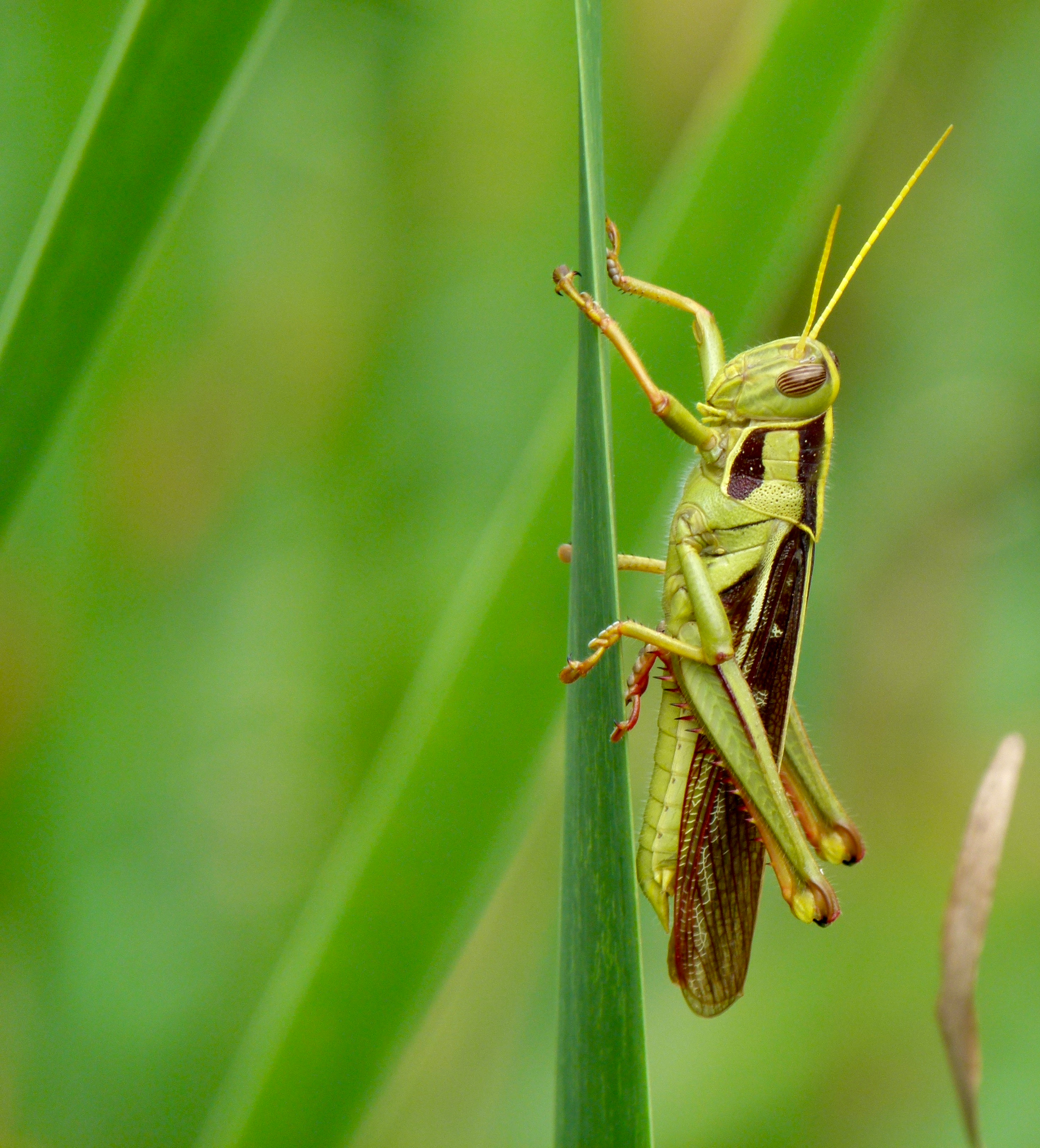

Scientific classification
- Domain: Eukaryota
- Kingdom: Animalia
- Phylum: Arthropoda
- Class: Insecta
- Order: Orthoptera
- Suborder: Caelifera
- Family: Acrididae
- Subfamily: Cyrtacanthacridinae
- Tribe: Cyrtacanthacridini
- Genus: Cyrtacanthacris
- Species: C. aeruginosa

Binomial name
- Cyrtacanthacris aeruginosa (Stoll, 1813)
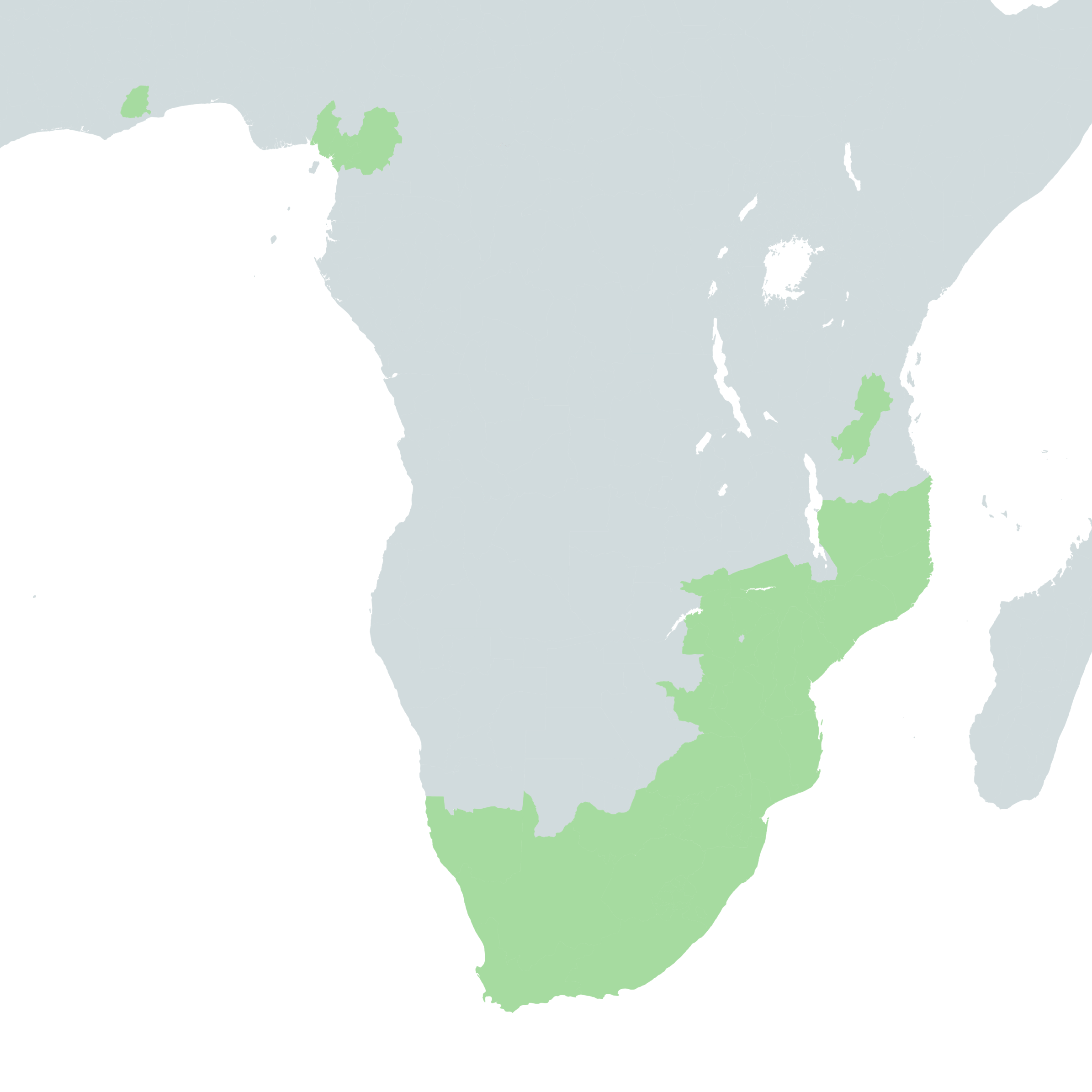
- Cyrtacanthacris aeruginosa's territorial extent

= Cyrtacanthacris aeruginosa =

Species of grasshopper

Cyrtacanthacris aeruginosa or simply green tree locust is a large species of grasshopper that can be found in the grasslands of Africa. They pertain to the genus Cyrtacanthacris and are composed by three subspecies, C. a. aeruginosa, C. a. flavescens and C. a. goldingi, all three of them descend from a unique ancestor. The species is univoltine, that is, it only produces one brood of offspring per year, furthermore it also experiences egg diapause, meaning that the eggs have a phase of suspended or arrested growth. In terms of overwintering strategy, Aeruginosa adults mate and then the female lay the eggs and die before the dry season, the eggs stay in diapause for 7 months and take 45–67 days to incubate.
