= Charles Birch =

Australian geneticist and theologian (1918–2009)

Louis Charles Birch AM FAA (1918–2009) was a distinguished Australian biologist and theologian. His pioneering work had a profound influence on both scientific and philosophical thought.

Birch served as Challis Professor of Biology at the University of Sydney for 25 years, and had visiting professorships at the University of California, Berkeley; and University of Sao Paulo, Brazil.

As a geneticist, he specialised in population ecology. Birch significantly advanced the understanding of how weather disturbances influence animal populations and their distribution. His book The Distribution and Abundance of Animals (co-authored with Herbert G. (Andy) Andrewartha), became foundational in ecology. It influenced generations of ecologists by shifting focus toward external environmental factors in population dynamics.

Birch was also well known as a theologian, writing widely on the topic of science and religion, becoming the first Australian to be awarded the Templeton Prize in 1990 for progress in religion. The prize recognised his work ascribing intrinsic value to all life.

He held fellowship of the American Association for the Advancement of Science, Australian Academy of Science, the Ecological Society of America, the British Ecological Society (the oldest Learned Society for ecologists in the world); and membership of the Club of Rome and the World Council of Churches.

Birch authored or co-authored some 18 books, 60 scientific articles; and some 85 articles related to issues of philosophy and religion.

== Early life ==
Birch was born in Melbourne on 8 February 1918, the son of Harry Birch, a New Zealand-born bank manager with the ES&A Bank, and his Irish-born wife, Nora. He had a twin brother, Sidney, and an older brother, Hugh. Birch attended Scotch College, Melbourne, and focused on agriculture at university in Melbourne.

Birch was educated at University of Melbourne, receiving a Bachelor of Agricultural Science in 1939. His first job was in the entomology department at the Waite Agricultural Research Institute at the University of Adelaide, where he earned a Doctorate of Science in 1941.

During his early time at university Birch became involved with the Student Christian Movement, and later often commented about its significant influence on his life.

== Career ==
During his six years of research at the University of Adelaide under supervisor, Herbert Andrewartha, with whom he forged a close relationship (and in 1988 shared the Eminent Ecologist Award, Ecological Society of America), Birch demonstrated that external processes, driven by weather and other types of disturbance, were vastly important in controlling the numbers and distribution of animals. This radical challenge to the prevailing views, namely that populations were self-regulating based on competition for limited resources, became one of Birch's major and enduring contributions to the science of ecology.

In 1948, Birch became a senior lecturer in the Department of Zoology at the University of Sydney. In 1954 he was promoted to reader in zoology; and that same year was awarded a Fulbright fellow, Colombia University, New York. In 1954 he became visiting professor of zoology, University of Sao Paulo, Brazil. In 1960 he was awarded the Challis Chair of Biology at the University of Sydney, which he held for 25 years until 1984.

From the early 1950s, Birch appeared increasingly in the media, warning of ecological problems, including overpopulation and pollution. In 1974 he coined the phrase "the ecological sustainable society" and arguably the word "sustainability" became the everyday term it is due to him, in part through his widely read 1975 book Confronting the Future.

During the Vietnam War, Birch was a prominent conscientious objector, so much so that Australia's spy agency ASIO held a file on him.

Birch held close contacts with some of the leading thinkers of the 20th century such as Reinhold Niebuhr, Paul Tillich and Carl von Weizsächer.

He also interacted with many of the world's leading thinkers in population and genetics, including Paul Ehrlich, and was prominent in the Zero Population Growth movement.

== Templeton Prize ==
Birch had a deep interest in the confluence of science and religion and the philosophy of science. He wrote widely on the relationship between the objective world of science and the subjective world of personal experience: Confronting the Future (1975), The Liberation of Life (1981) and Science and Soul (2007). Birch discussed his deep interest in the confluence of science and religion in his 1989 interview by Caroline Jones on her Radio National program, The Search for Meaning; and in his 1997 presentation on the Radio National program, Ockham's Razor.

His 1990 book On Purpose linked cosmic evolution to biological and social evolution: "Finding purpose pervasive throughout the individual entities of the universe".

Following On Purpose, Birch was awarded the prestigious Templeton prize for progress in religion. He was the first Australian, and fourth scientist (the first three being Alister Hardy, Stanley Jaki and von Weizsächer) to receive the $793,000 prize. It was presented by the Duke of Edinburgh at Buckingham Palace.

He said in his acceptance speech, "I find the honour of these proceedings quite overwhelming, not the least because I would never have regarded myself as worthy to be amongst the chosen few who receive such an honour...it is with deep gratitude, sober humility, and a renewed hope in the future that I accept this distinguished award."

== Views, holism and "purpose" ==
As a boy, Birch had an early fascination with the diversity and beauty of insects. He developed his interest in biology in particular because of his mother's encouragement. She gave him J. B. S. Haldane's Possible Worlds. Other influences, including an evangelical religion, underpinned his life goal of wanting to help people.

Birch credited Dr Herbert Andrewartha as having a great influence on him, teaching him "to think" and to discover "the social responsibility of the scientist", saying:

"In view of the enormous transformation of the modern world as a result of science and technology, the scientist is responsible for much that has happened both good and bad. This understanding is based on the premise that science is not value free."

Birch said a major scientific influence was A.N. Whitehead, with his emphasis on "processes and relationships".

Other major scientific influences included Andrewartha; Theodosius Dobzhansky; Sewall Wright; and Charles Hartshorne.

Birch considered himself a "postmodernist" insofar as he revolted against mechanistic classical science and embraced David Bohm's "implicate order", Ilya Prigogine's "Dissipative structures" and Rupert Sheldrake's "morphogenetic fields", in which the key process is holism. Birch said:

"I'm always on the boundary because I think the sub divisions we make between physics, chemistry, biology, economics these are man-made boundaries just for convenience. But in terms of trying to look at the thing as a whole, they're not always helpful, so we have to have a vision that bridges the whole of understanding of knowledge."

Paul Ehrlich wrote that Birch "sought to find meaning and purpose in life in general and human life in particular".

During the Vietnam War, Birch took part in the anti-war campaigns and helped dissident students in their battles against conscription, which he strongly opposed. Birch was involved for many years with the Wayside Chapel in Sydney, where people were encouraged to walk in off the street to participate in discussions about life and religion.

== Legacy and influence ==
In their obituary of Birch, Paul Ehlich and Grahm Pyke wrote:

"So Charles, a shy superstar whom a junior could tease, had major roles in our lives as teacher, mentor, supporter, colleague, and friend. He was a great man and we shall always remember him with love and admiration. We know that he played similar roles in the lives of many others, and in his last days, his hospital room was a rallying point for old friends, students, and colleagues. He leaves behind a profound legacy."

In 2009 Birch said, "So I think my advice to the young scientist would be, 'Pursue the objective world as hard as you can – and that's what I have tried to do – but see if you cannot also include, as a part of the whole experience, the subjective, feeling side of things. That will lead to a greater understanding of the world around us.'"

Those influenced by Birch include:

Graeme Caughley: He was known for his research into herbivore-vegetation dynamics, and had a major influence on thinking and practice in the field of vertebrate ecology and wildlife management throughout the world. Birch (with Harry Frith) supervised Caughley's MSc at Sydney University on the comparative ecology of Red and Eastern Gray Kangaroos. Birch said of Caughley: "If he has any irksome qualities they are a tendency to exaggerate for effect, to be a bit of a know all and to always be right. It is a sort of game playing in which points are being scored. In other words you do not always get a frank and open discussion with him if something he values is at stake, and he does have some very definite points of view and objectives. This does not basically make him a difficult person to work with. It does mean that on some issues one learns to take him with a grain of salt."

John B. Cobb Jr.: Birch co-authored The Liberation of Life with Cobb, a prominent American theologian and philosopher. Their collaboration bridged science and theology, advocating for the intrinsic value of all life and influencing the field of process theology. Birch said "I owe to Professor John Cobb of the Centre for Process Studies in the School of Theology at Claremont in California much of my understanding of theology in the context of a postmodern ecological worldview…I began a friendship that became a source of deep understanding across the years. I see him, like Paul Abrecht, on the frontiers of thinking and action for a new ecological global society."

Paul Ehrlich: His view of ecology was fundamentally changed by Birch's The Distribution and Abundance of Animals: "For the first time, a fine framework was put together that dealt with the key issues of population ecology, and along with early contributions to community ecology by Cowles, Gleason, Grinnell, Elton and others, set ecology on the road to its present status as the most important science."

Jeremy Griffith: Griffith studied biology at Sydney University under Birch, and throughout his life Birch supported Griffith's work into the human condition. Griffith acknowledged Birch's importance to his work, saying, "These are the few scientists, such as Charles Birch, who have dared to acknowledge integrative meaning or holism. They are showing the way. To my way of thinking they are very great heroes. Without their words, their leadership I wouldn't have dared to keep thinking in this more holistic vein." Birch wrote "In his book Beyond The Human Condition Jeremy Griffith makes the right emphasis when he identifies the order of the universe and its cosmic and biological evolution as the issue that brings science and religion together…[Griffith] gives us a genuinely original and inspiring way of understanding ourselves and our place in the universe." He also wrote the foreword to Griffith's 2003 book A Species in Denial.

Lord Robert May: Early in his career he was encouraged by Birch to move from physics to ecology, and take advantage of a sabbatical to visit Imperial College at the invitation of Professor Richard Southwood, which began a series of collaborations with ecologists at Imperial, the University of York and Oxford University. Birch said to May "Well, you know I think mathematics doesn't have much to say about ecology, but who knows who's right. My friend Ken Watt, whose book you've just read, would really love that. Write it up, send it to him, come and give a seminar in biology." May described Birch as "…a wonderful man. He was one of the founders of Social Responsibility in Science in Australia, and involved in all these "1998 things". Also, in the Vietnam War, he was a willing source of counselling for people who wanted to not be caught up in it – in a very un-ego-gratifying way."

Graham H. Pyke: Birch played a major role in Pyke's life, steering him into wanting to be a scientist rather than an engineer. "Throughout my research career I have benefited from advice and mentoring received from many colleagues, especially Charles Birch".

Holmes Rolston III: A Templeton Prize recipient, often called the "father of environmental ethics," Rolston's philosophical work paralleled Birch's emphasis on the intrinsic value of all life. While not a direct student, Rolston's ideas resonated strongly with Birch's ecological and theological synthesis. Rolston said of Birch, "He's a friend of mine, we are acquainted, he's a previous Templeton Prize winner. Birch, with John Cobb, has a book on the celebration of life on respect for life, and in that sense his thinking and my thinking are parallel. Birch is an ecologist so one of the things he knows is that organisms don't simply exist on their own and by themselves in isolation, but they exist as adapted fits in the ecosystems, and I like to replace the language of survival of the fittest, which Richard Dawkins has his selfish genes and survival of the fittest, I'd like to say it's more a question of organisms having a good adapted fit, and I think Charles Birch would think along those lines equally."

Richard Shine: In 1978 Shine was appointed a postdoctoral position at the University of Sydney under Birch. Shine interviewed Birch in 2008 on behalf of the Australian Academy of Science.

== Honors and awards ==
- 1945 – 1946 Research in the growth of insect populations and other aspects of insect ecology at University of Chicago, Illinois, U.S.A., Science and Industry Endowment Fund
- 1954 Fulbright Fellow, Columbia University, New York, U.S.A.
- 1955 David Syme Research Prize (shared with H. G. Andrewartha), University of Melbourne
- 1961 Fellow, Australian Academy of Science (FAA)
- 1970-83 vice-chairman of the World Council of Churches, Church and Society Committee
- 1974 elected to the Club of Rome
- 1980 Fellow, American Association for the Advancement of Science
- Fellow, Academy of Environmental Biology of India
- 1988 Eminent Ecologist Award (with Herbert Andrewartha), Ecological Society of America
- 1988 Gold Medal, Ecological Society of Australia
- 1990 Templeton Prize, John Templeton Foundation, U.S.A.
- 2003 DSc honoris causa, University of Sydney
- 2003 DSc honoris causa, University of Sydney
- 2008 Member of the Order of Australia (AM) for service to science, particularly in the field of biology as an academic and researcher, and through contributions to the understanding of the relationship of science to religion

== Death ==
Birch died on 19 December 2009. He never married. He was survived by his twin, Sidney, and sister-in-law, Jenny.

== Publications ==
- The Distribution and Abundance of Animals, with H. G. Andrewartha. University of Chicago Press, 1954
- Nature and God, SCM Press, 1965
- Confronting the Future: Australia and the world: the next hundred years, Penguin Books, 1975 (2nd edition 1993) ISBN 0-14-021937-4
- Genetics and the Quality of Life, with Paul Abrecht. Pergamon Press, 1975. ISBN 0-08-018210-0
- Another Australia in a Just and Sustainable Global Society: An Address University of Newcastle, 1976.
- The Liberation of Life: From the Cell to the Community, with John B. Cobb Jr., Cambridge University Press, 1981. ISBN 0-521-23787-4
- The Ecological Web: more on the distribution and abundance of animals, with H. G. Andrewartha. University of Chicago Press, 1984. ISBN 0-226-02033-9
- Liberating Life: Contemporary Approaches to Ecological Theory, Orbis, 1990 ISBN 0-88344-689-8
- On Purpose, UNSW Press, 1990. ISBN 0-86840-371-7 (published in the US as A Purpose for Everything: Religion in a Postmodern World View, Twentythird Publications, 1990. ISBN 0-89622-453-8)
- Regaining Compassion for Humanity and Nature, UNSW Press, 1993. ISBN 0-86840-213-3
- Feelings, UNSW Press, 1995. ISBN 0-86840-151-X
- Living With the Animals: The Community of God's Creatures, with Lukas Vischer. Risk Book Series, World Council of Churches, 1996. ISBN 2-8254-1227-9
- Biology and the Riddle of Life, co-published by UNSW Press (Australia), 1999. ISBN 0-86840-785-2
- Life and Work: Challenging Economic Man, with David Paul. UNSW Press, 2003. ISBN 0-86840-670-8
- Science and Soul, co-published by UNSW Press (Australia), 2007 and Templeton Foundation Press (USA), 2008. ISBN 978-0-86840-958-0
