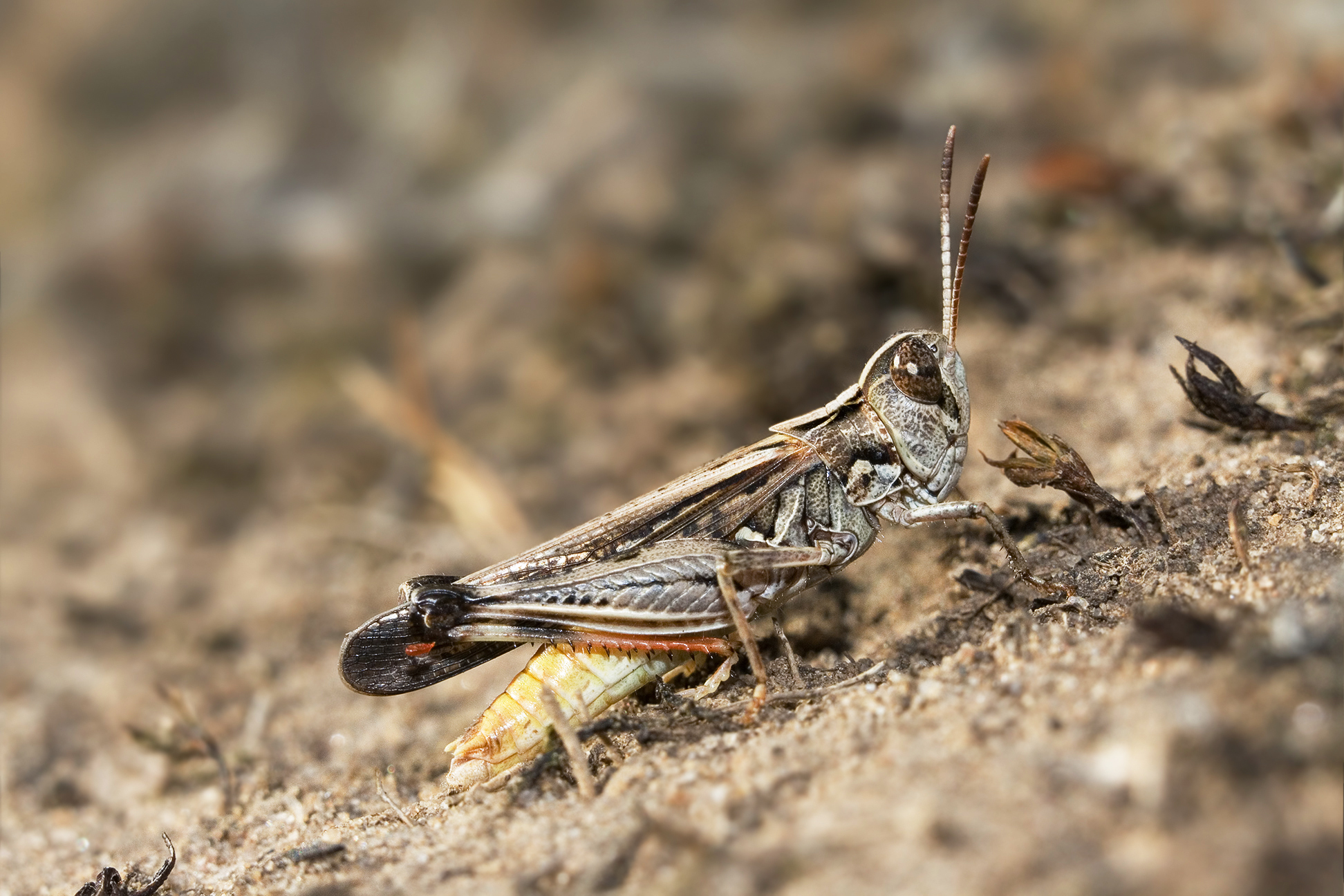

Scientific classification
- Domain: Eukaryota
- Kingdom: Animalia
- Phylum: Arthropoda
- Class: Insecta
- Order: Orthoptera
- Suborder: Caelifera
- Family: Acrididae
- Genus: Austroicetes
- Species: A. vulgaris

Binomial name
- Austroicetes vulgaris Sjöstedt, 1932

= Austroicetes vulgaris =

Species of grasshopper

Austroicetes vulgaris, the southeastern austroicetes, is a grasshopper in the genus Austroicetes. It is sometimes a pest in Tasmania, and can also be found in Northern Territory, Australia.
