= Austroicetes cruciata =

Scientific classification
- Domain: Eukaryota
- Kingdom: Animalia
- Phylum: Arthropoda
- Class: Insecta
- Order: Orthoptera
- Suborder: Caelifera
- Family: Acrididae
- Genus: Austroicetes
- Species: A. cruciata

Binomial name
- Austroicetes cruciata (Saussure, 1888)

Synonyms
- Chortoicetes jungi Brancsik, 1897; Chortoicetes monticola Sjöstedt, 1936; Dittopternis cruciata Saussure, 1888

Species of grasshopper

Austroicetes cruciata, the small plague locust, is a species of grasshopper within the family Acrididae. The species is found in Australia in Western Australia, South Australia, and New South Wales. Adults lengths include females growing 25 to 35 mm whereas males grow from 15 to 25 mm. Colorations are brown to greenish, however during swarming males can appear bright yellow, which no other member in its genus exhibits.
