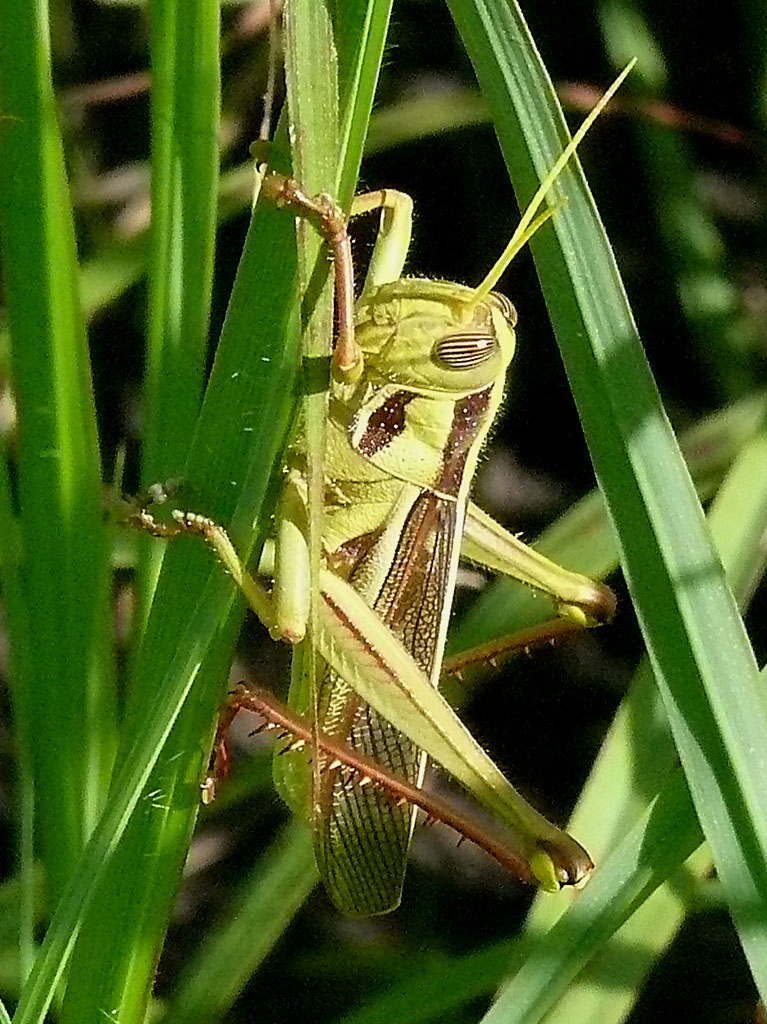
- Cyrtacanthacris aeruginosa male

Scientific classification
- Kingdom: Animalia
- Phylum: Arthropoda
- Class: Insecta
- Order: Orthoptera
- Suborder: Caelifera
- Family: Acrididae
- Tribe: Cyrtacanthacridini
- Genus: Cyrtacanthacris; Walker, 1870

Synonyms
- Acridium Serville, 1831

= Cyrtacanthacris =

Genus of grasshoppers

Cyrtacanthacris is the type genus of grasshoppers in the subfamily Cyrtacanthacridinae. Species records are distributed in Africa through to Indo-China.

== Species ==
The Orthoptera Species File lists:

- Cyrtacanthacris aeruginosa Stoll, 1813
- Cyrtacanthacris celebensis Finot, 1907
- Cyrtacanthacris consanguinea Serville, 1838
- Cyrtacanthacris consobrina Walker, 1870
- Cyrtacanthacris neocaledonica Finot, 1907
- Cyrtacanthacris sulphurea Johnston, 1935
- Cyrtacanthacris tatarica Linnaeus, 1758 - type species (as Gryllus tataricus L. = C. tatarica tatarica)

== Gallery ==
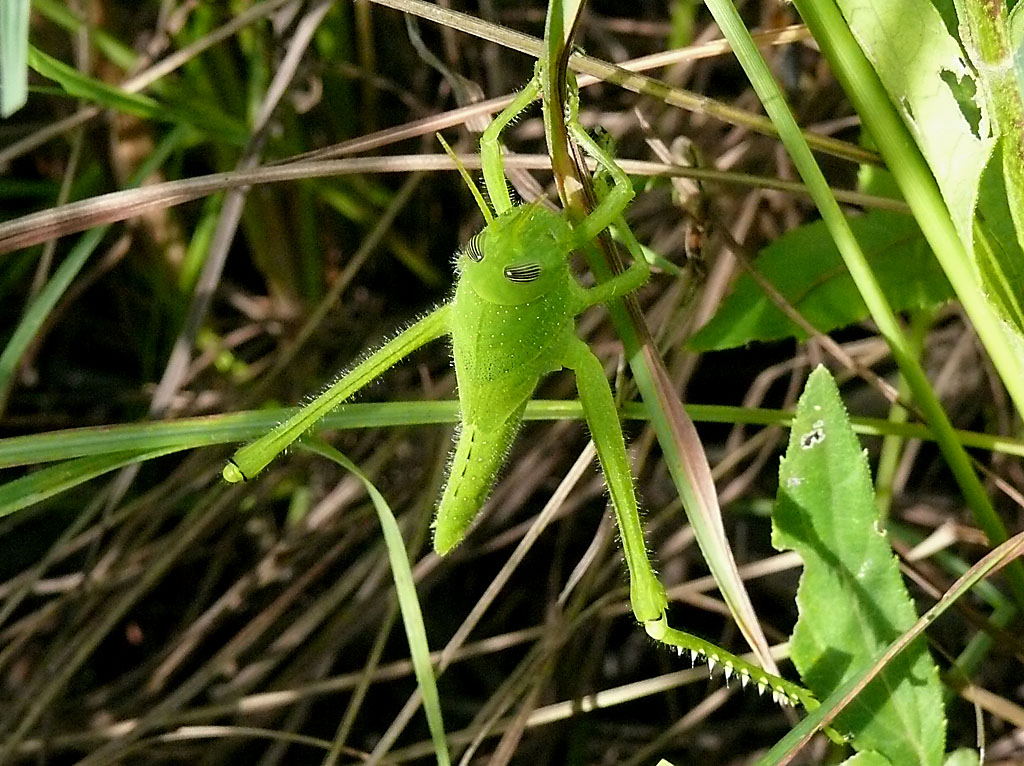
C. aeruginosa nymph

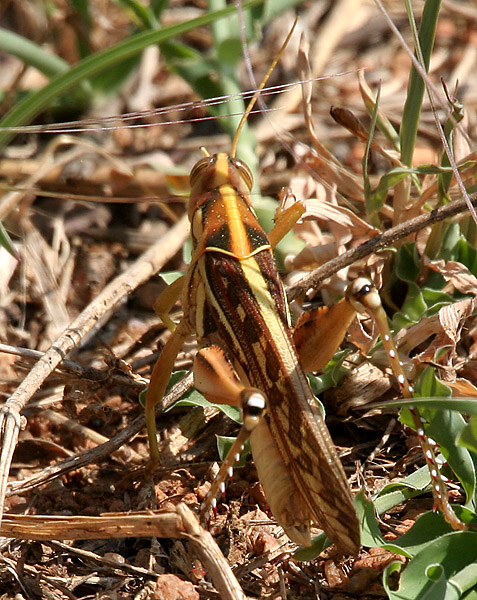
C. tatarica in India

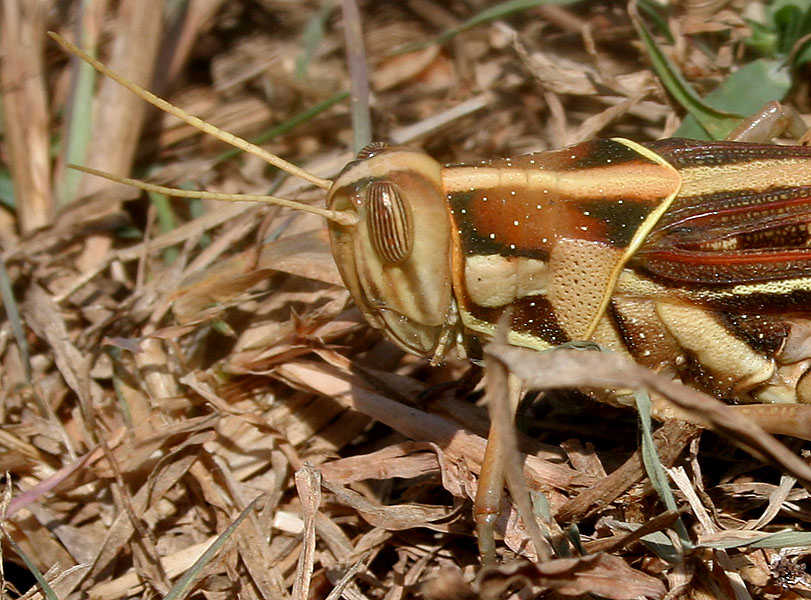

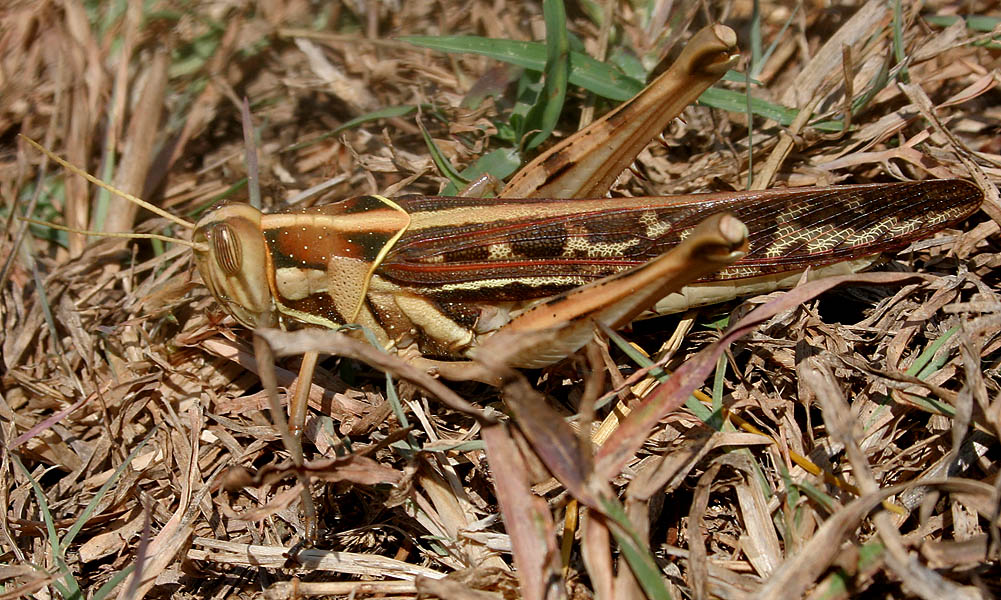
